= 1982 in Norway =

- Centuries: 18th; 19th; 20th; 21st
- Decades: 1960s; 1970s; 1980s; 1990s; 2000s
- See also: List of years in Norway

Events in the year 1982 in Norway.

== Incumbents ==
- Monarch – Olav V.
- Prime Minister – Kåre Willoch (Conservative Party)

== Events ==
- 11 March – Widerøe Flight 933 crashed into the Barents Sea near Mehamn, killing all 15 on board; this accident remains highly controversial in Norway.
- 2 July – A bomb explodes in a locker at the Oslo Central Station. A young woman is killed and eleven others are injured.
- 9 July – An unexploded bomb is found and defused in the cargo storage at the Oslo central station.
- 9 October – An 18-year-old confesses that it was he who was behind the bombing of the Central Station in Oslo.
- 11 October – Eight paintings worth an estimated 25 million NOK are stolen from the National Gallery in Oslo .
- 18 October – the trial of Arnfinn Nesset, who stands accused of killing 25 patients at the Geriatric institution in Orkdal Municipality where he was the director, begins.
- The Norwegian Ministry of Culture and Church Affairs is established

== Popular culture ==
=== Literature ===
- Gunvor Hofmo, writer and poet, is awarded the Dobloug Prize literature award.
- Sissel Lange-Nielsen, writer, literary critic, and journalist, is awarded the Riksmål Society Literature Prize.
- Åge Rønning, writer and journalist, is awarded the Norwegian Critics Prize for Literature for his novel Kolbes reise.

== Notable births ==
=== January ===
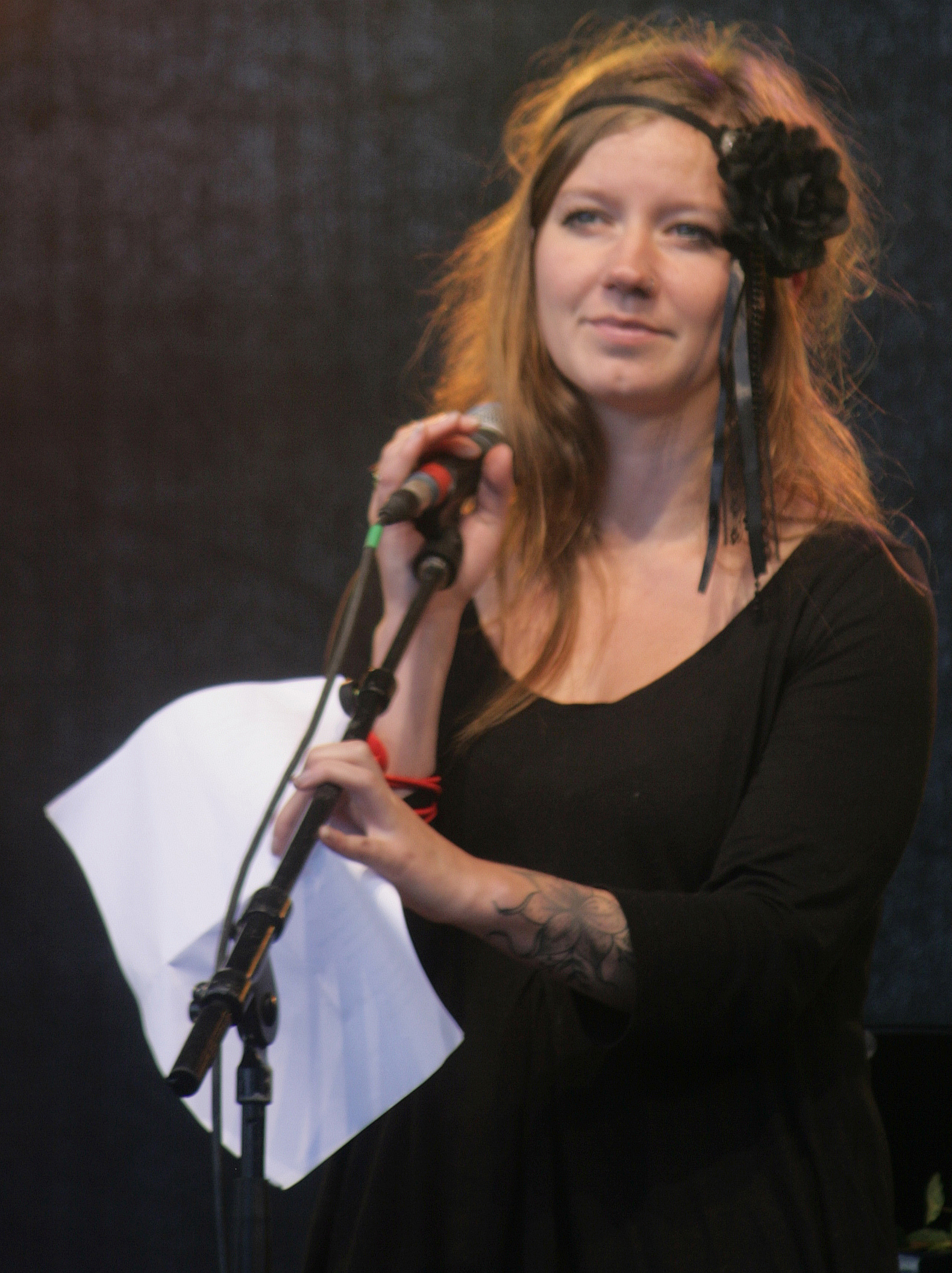
Maria Solheim

- 1 January
  - Mah-Rukh Ali, journalist and news anchor
  - Andreas Lønmo Knudsrød, drummer
- 5 January – Kjersti Buaas, snowboarder
- 16 January
  - Martin Høyem, footballer
  - Are Hansen, sport shooter
- 19 January – Maria Solheim, singer-songwriter
- 20 January – Fredrik Strømstad, footballer
- 23 January – Børre Næss, cross-country skier
- 24 January – Alexander Buchmann, handball player
- 26 January – Bjørnar Ustad Kristensen, track and field athlete

=== February ===
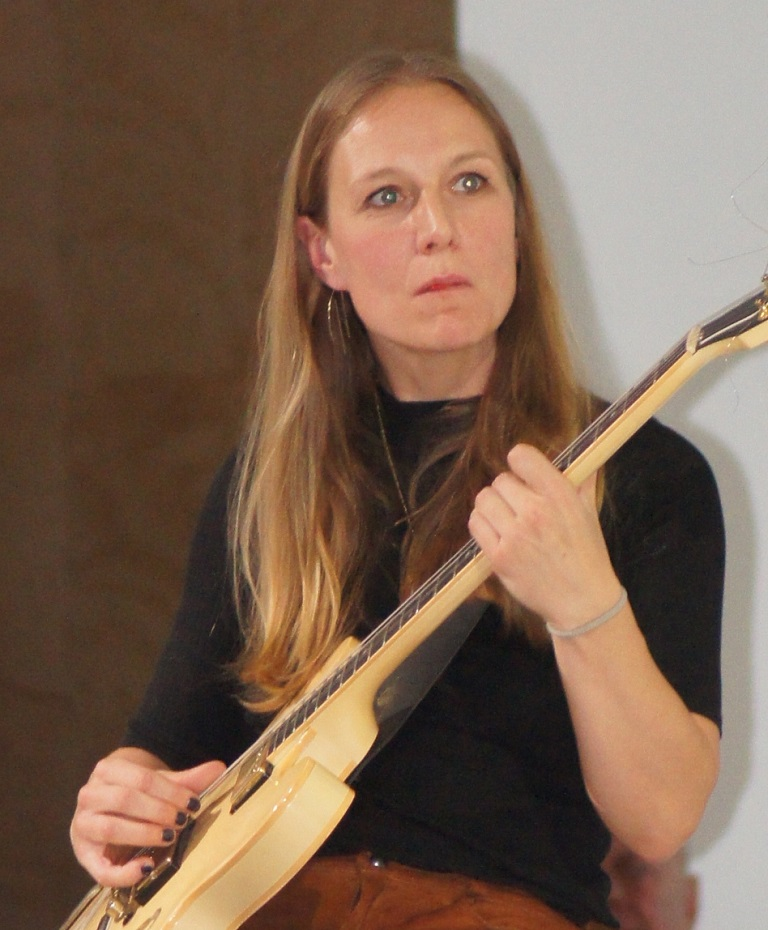
Hedvig Mollestad Thomassen

- 2 February – Sofie Cappelen, actress
- 4 February – Hedvig Mollestad Thomassen, musician
- 12 February – Øyvind Hegg-Lunde, musician
- 13 February – Even Helte Hermansen, guitarist
- 18 February – Kristian Ystaas, footballer

=== March ===
- 5 March – Toril Hetland Akerhaugen, footballer
- 8 March – Isak Strand, musician, sound engineer, music producer and composer
- 9 March – Gunnar Greve, talent manager, producer, singer, songwriter and record executive
- 19 March – Triana Iglesias, model and burlesque artist
- 21 March – Christoffer Svae, curler
- 25 March – Gard Filip Gjerdalen, cross-country skier

=== April ===
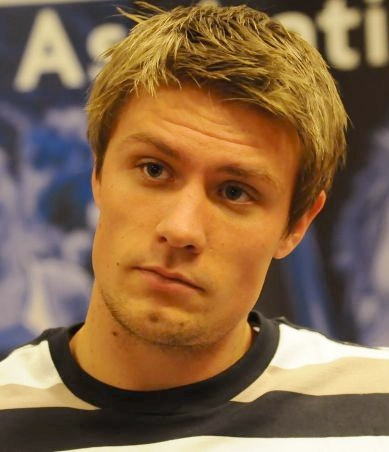
Andreas Thorkildsen

- 1 April – Andreas Thorkildsen, javelin thrower.
- 2 April – Daniel Herskedal, jazz tubist
- 5 April
  - Ann-Kristin Engstad, politician
  - Jon André Fredriksen, footballer
- 7 April – Joshua French, security contractor
- 9 April – Øyvind Skarbø, drummer and composer
- 14 April – Kari Innerå, chef
- 19 April – Ola Vigen Hattestad, cross-country skier
- 21 April
  - Ørjan Hartveit, singer
- 23 April
  - Lars Nordberg, handball player
  - Birger Madsen, footballer
- 25 April – Tommy Runar, footballer
- 30 April – Christine Colombo Nilsen, footballer

=== May ===
- 13 May – Solfrid Andersen, footballer
- 19 May – Pål Steffen Andresen, footballer
- 20 May – Morten Giæver, footballer
- 25 May – Daniel Braaten, footballer
- 26 May – Else Marie Tveit Rødby, politician.
- 29 May – Bjarte Myrhol, handball player

=== June ===
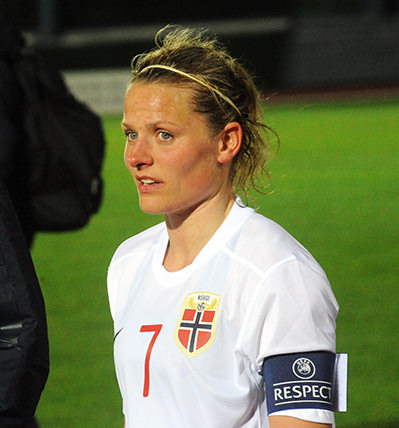
Trine Rønning

- 4 June – Stian Remme, racing cyclist
- 10 June – Ruth Kasirye, weightlifter
- 11 June
  - Håkon Opdal, footballer
  - Eldar Rønning, cross-country skier
  - Renate Urne, handball player
- 14 June
  - Anders Jektvik, singer, songwriter and guitarist
  - Ørjan Nilsen, producer and DJ
  - Trine Rønning, footballer.
- 22 June
  - Trond Fredrik Ludvigsen, footballer
  - Svenn Erik Medhus, handball player
- 23 June – Einar Tørnquist, drummer and talk-show host
- 25 June – Mato Grubisic, footballer
- 28 June – Hedda Strand Gardsjord, footballer

=== July ===
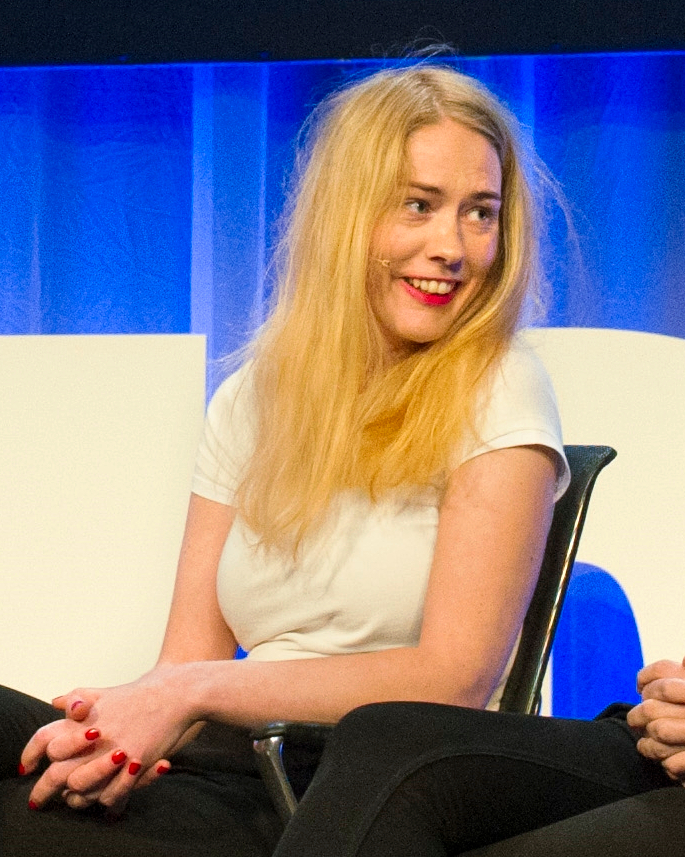
Julie Andem

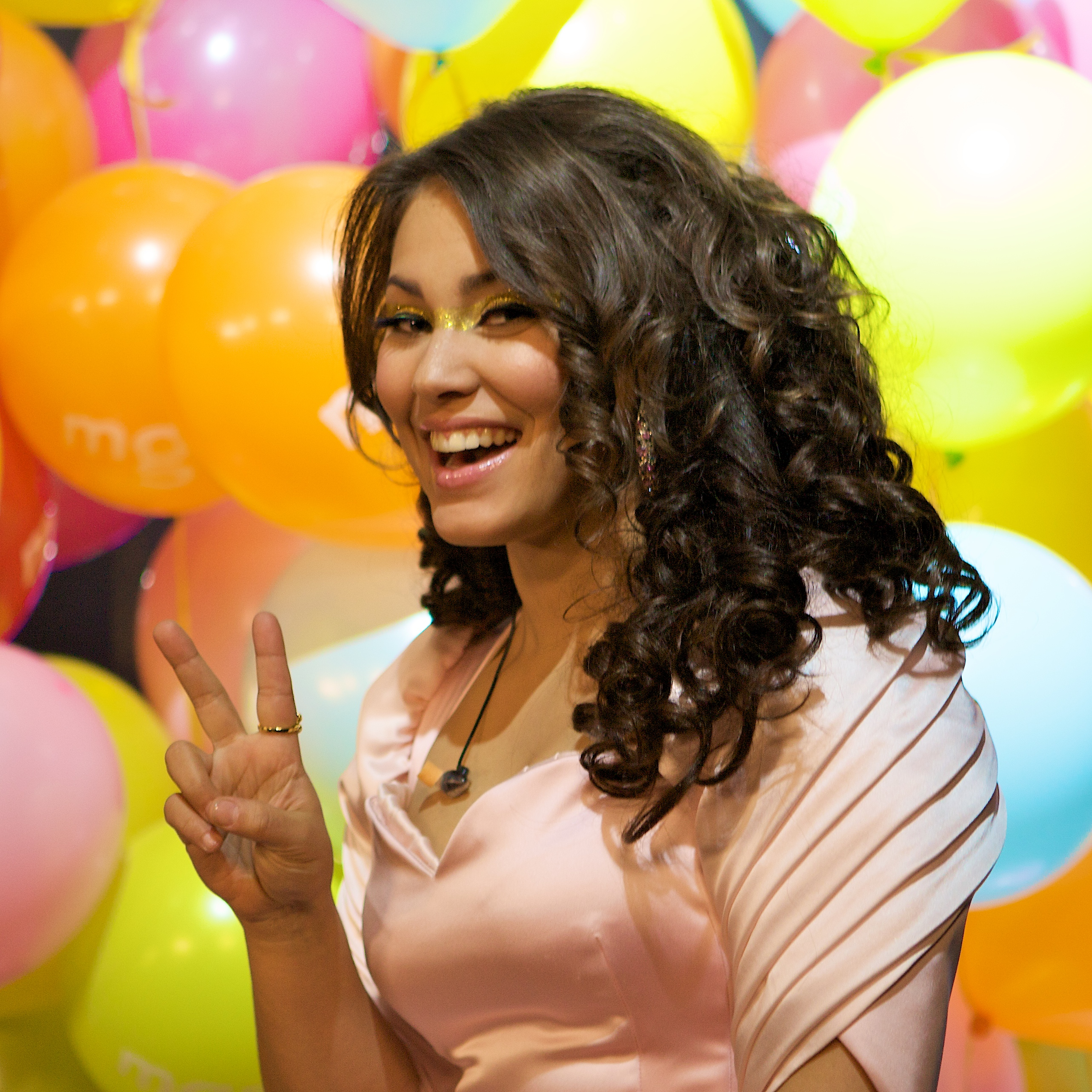
Mira Craig

- 1 July – Hilma Nikolaisen, musician
- 4 July – Julie Andem, screenwriter, director, and television producer.
- 6 July – Petter Vågan, singer, guitarist and composer
- 10 July – Solveig Vitanza, politician.
- 13 July – Julia Schacht, actress
- 15 July
  - Silje Bjerke, chess player.
  - Carl Espen, singer and songwriter
  - Haakon Lunov, footballer
- 20 July – Lars Erik Bjørnsen, handball player
- 22 July – Ole Talberg, footballer
- 24 July – Tord Øverland Knudsen, musician
- 27 July – Kristin Minde, pop singer and pianist
- 28 July
  - Sara Blengsli Kværnø, badminton player
  - Carl Waaler Kaas, orienteering competitor
- 31 July
  - Mira Craig, R&B artist
  - Solveig Rogstad, biathlete

=== August ===
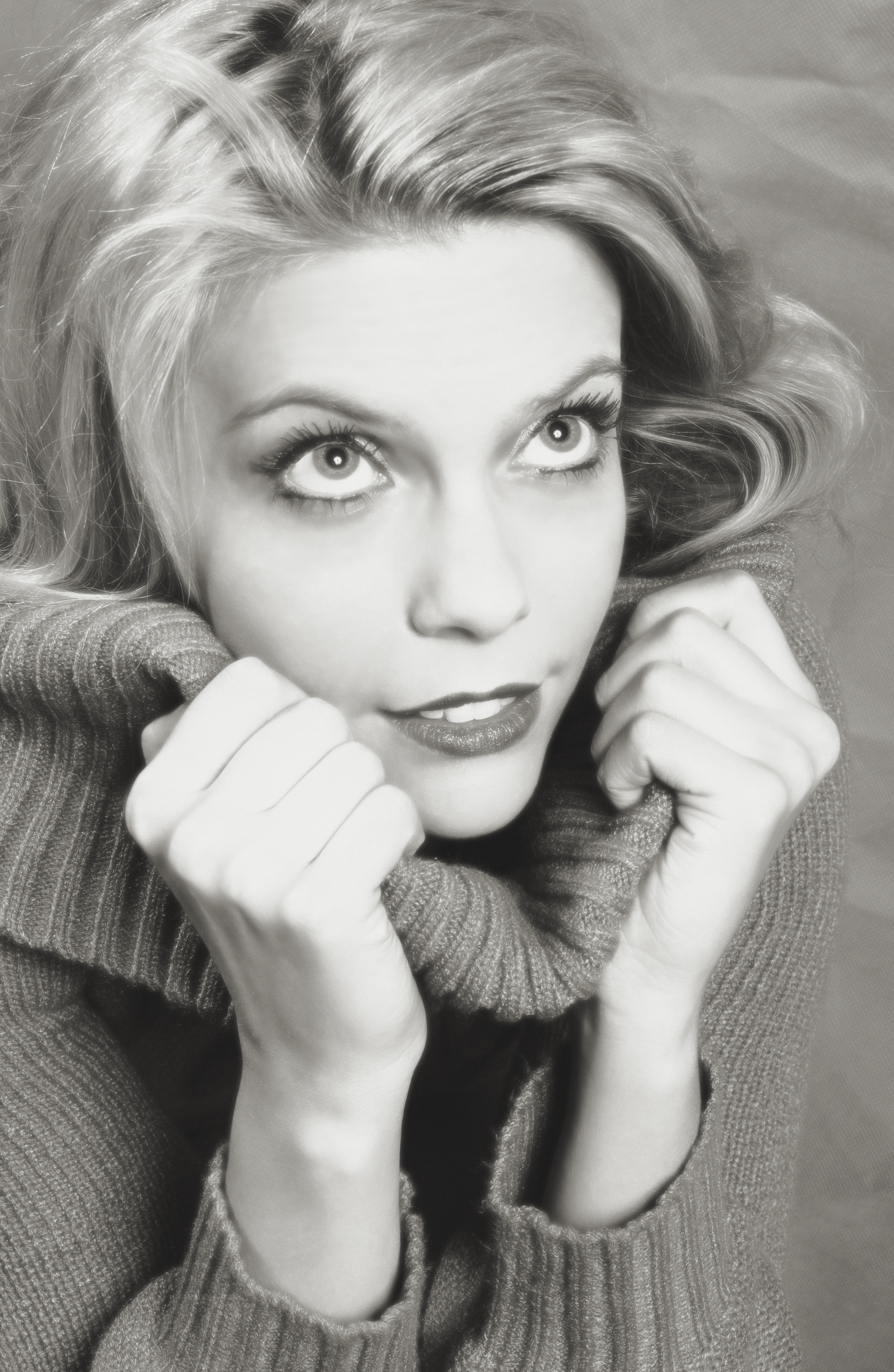
Silje Reinåmo

- 7 August – Anders Hana, musician
- 10 August – Dag Ole Teigen, politician
- 12 August – Even Wetten, speed skater
- 18 August – Odd Harald Johansen, politician
- 19 August – Kurt Heggestad, footballer
- 24 August
  - Anders Bardal, ski jumper
  - Glen Atle Larsen, footballer
- 25 August – Silje Reinåmo, actress, dancer, and musical performer
- 28 August – Robert Evensen, footballer
- 31 August – Marie Knutsen, footballer

=== September ===
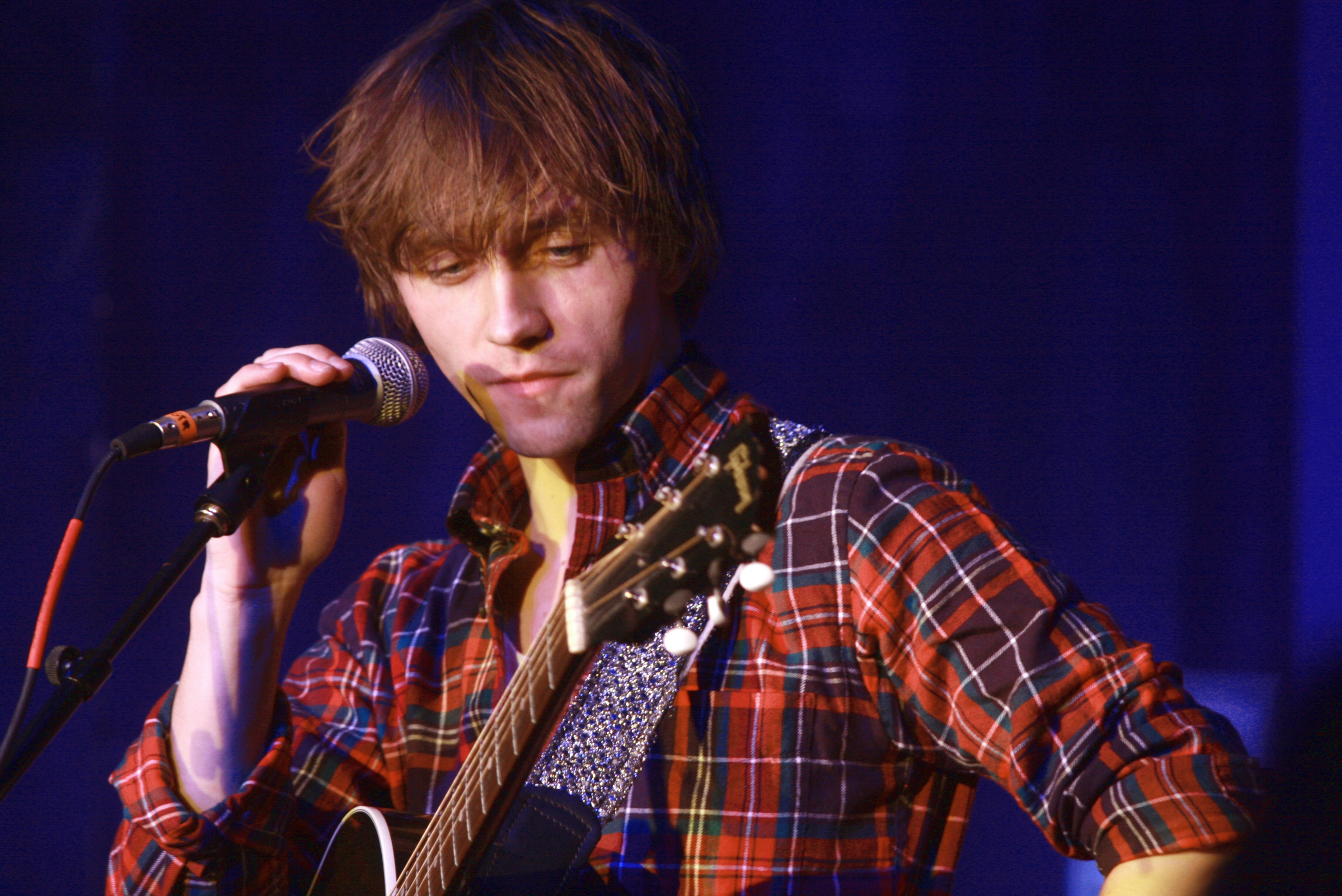
Sondre Lerche

- 6 September – Tora Bakke Håndlykken, newspaper editor.
- 5 September – Sondre Lerche, singer, songwriter and multi-instrumentalist
- 18 September – Mikael Flygind Larsen, speed skater
- 22 September – Masud Gharahkhani, politician
- 26 September – Linn Githmark, curler

=== October ===
- 1 October – Pål Rustadstuen, footballer
- 2 October – Aleksander Midtsian, footballer
- 2 October – Sverre Haugli, speed skater
- 6 October – Alexander Lund Hansen, footballer
- 12 October – Chand Torsvik, singer
- 13 October – Hanneli Mustaparta, photographer, fashion blogger, stylist and model
- 20 October – Jan-Erik Fjell, novelist.

=== November ===
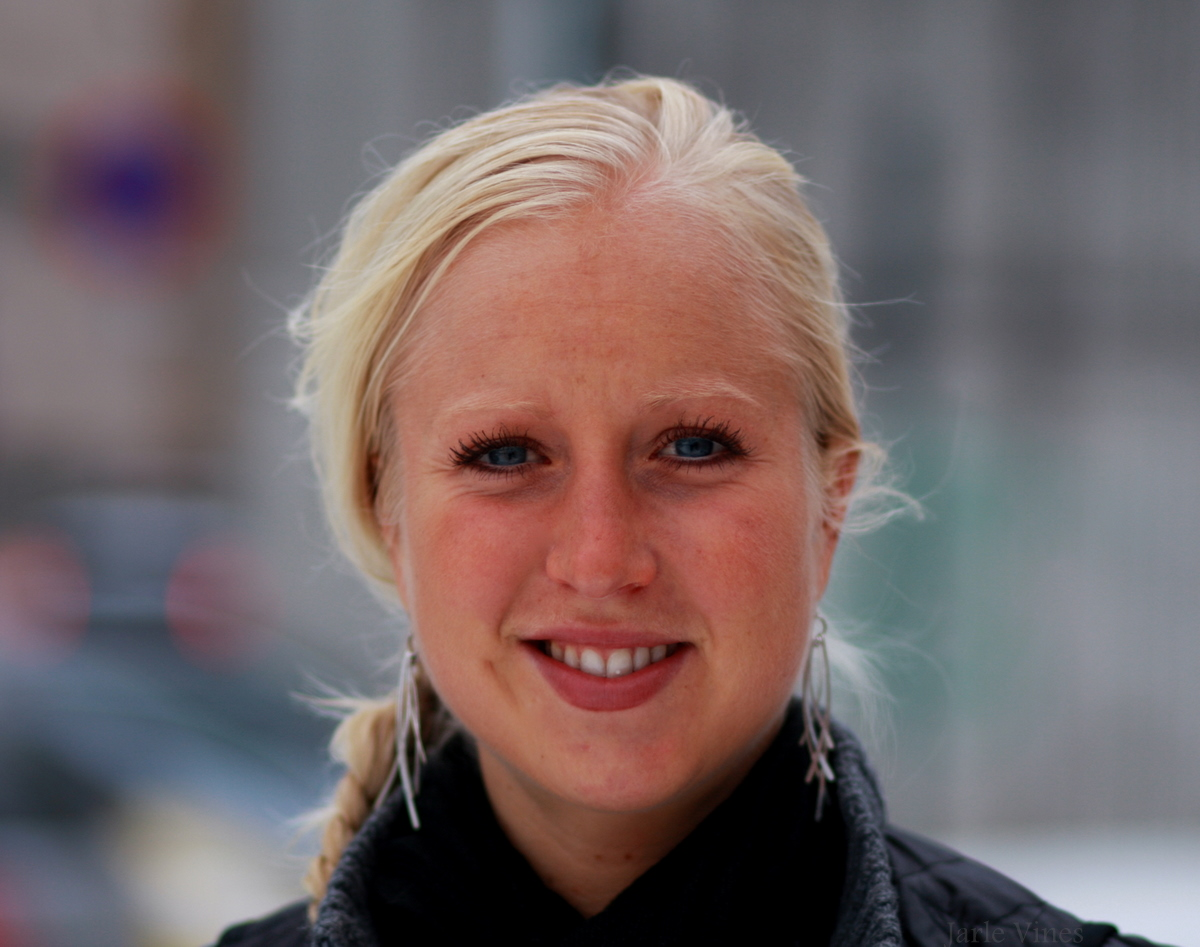
Lene Byberg

- 6 November
  - Ann Kristin Flatland, biathlete
- 7 November – Knut Henrik Spets, ice hockey player
- 17 November – Thomas Sørum, footballer
- 21 November – Aleksander L. Nordaas, screenwriter and film director
- 24 November – Therese Birkelund Ulvo, composer and producer
- 25 November – Lene Byberg, cross-country mountain biker and road bicycle racer
- 29 November – Marthe Valle, singer and songwriter

=== December ===
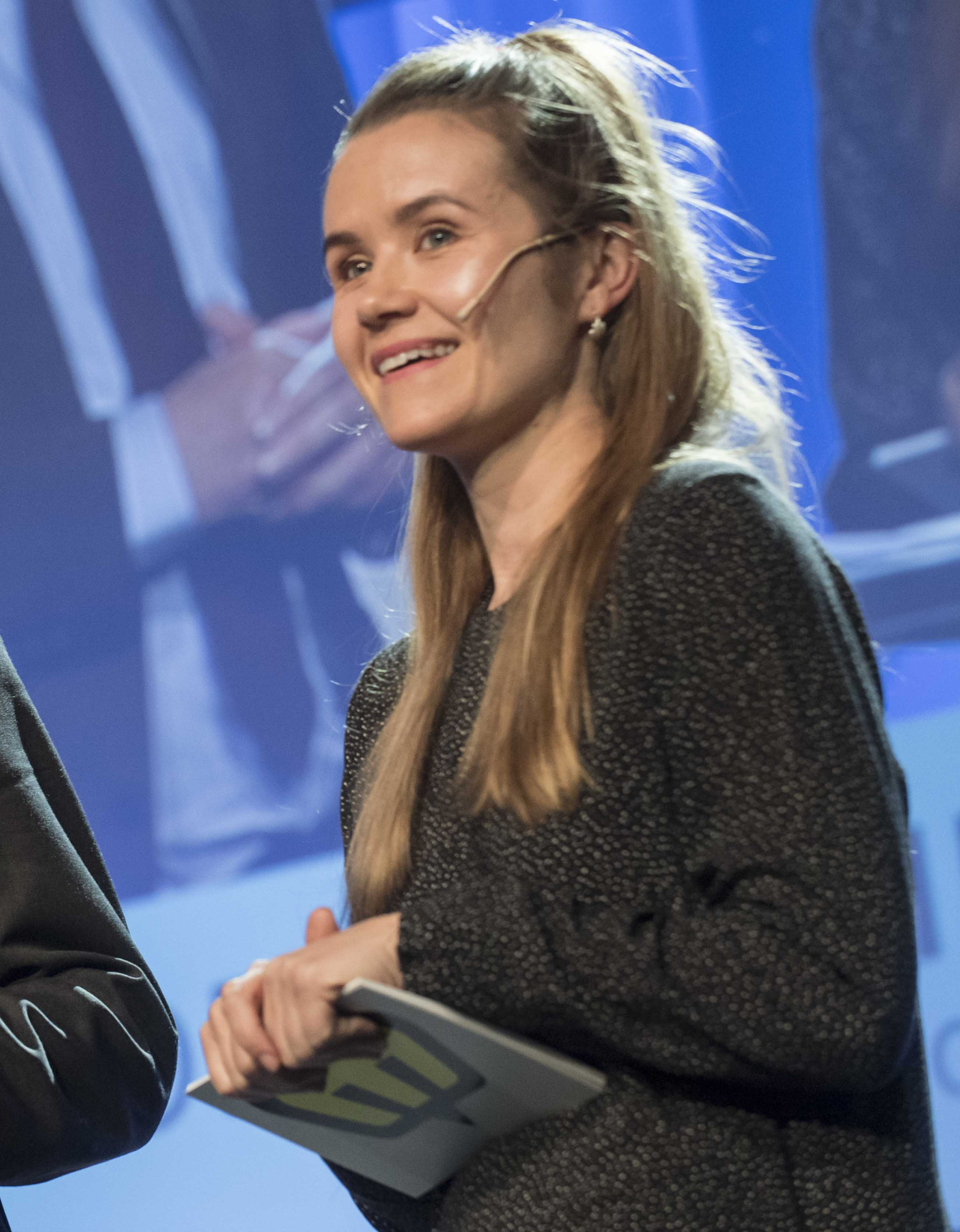
Live Nelvik

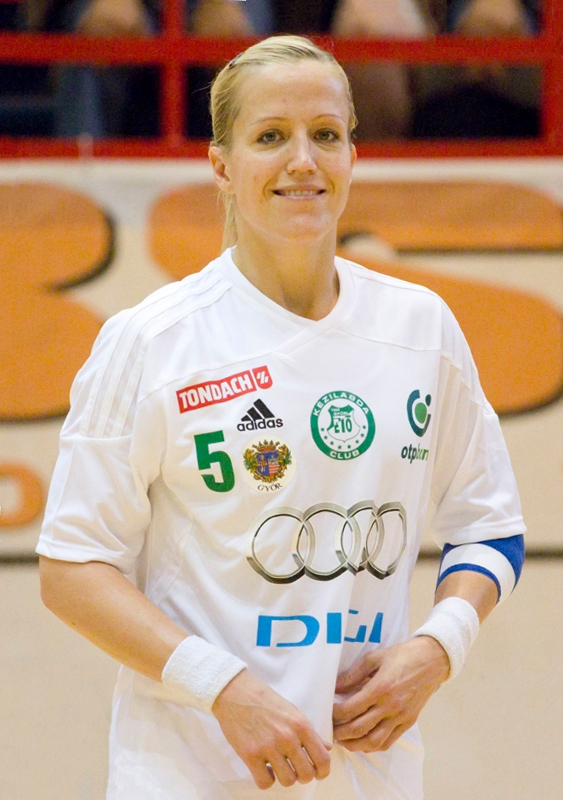
Heidi Løke

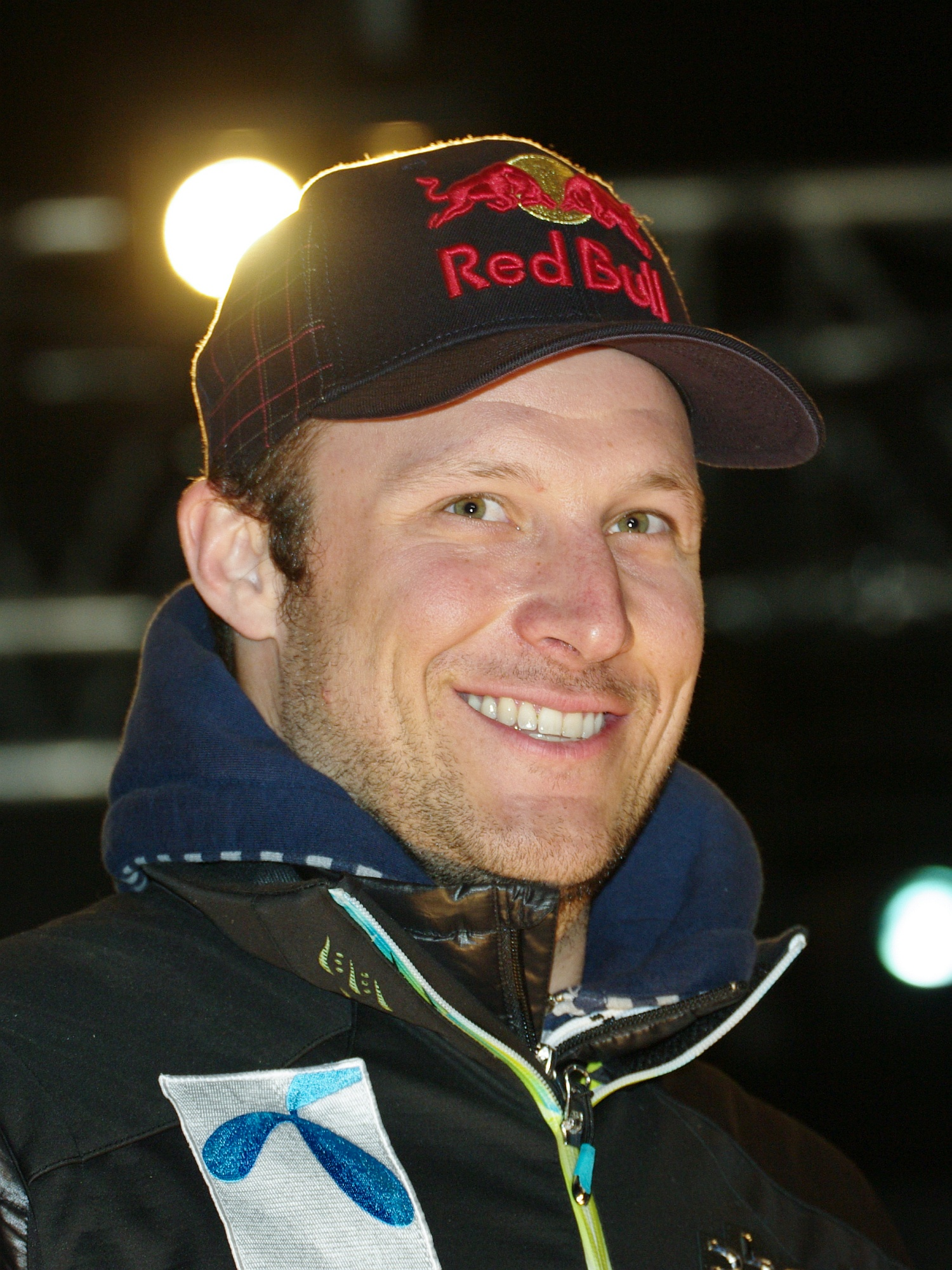
Aksel Lund Svindal

- 2 December – Siren Sundby, sailor
- 10 December – Live Nelvik, radio and television presenter and actress
- 12 December – Heidi Løke, handball player.
- 16 December – Hans Olav Uldal, track and field athlete
- 17 December – Stephan Meidell, guitarist and composer
- 19 December – Gjøran Sæther, artist and painter
- 26 December – Aksel Lund Svindal, alpine skier.
- 28 December – Anne Gerd Eieland, high jumper

=== Full date missing ===
- Espen Aune, strongman competitor
- Alex Dahl, crime fiction writer
- Triana Iglesias, model and burlesque artist
- Marte Wexelsen Goksøyr, actress, public speaker, writer and public debater
- Tina Signesdottir Hult, photographer
- Runar Jørstad, journalist
- Håvard Lothe, musician
- Kristin Solberg, journalist

== Notable deaths ==
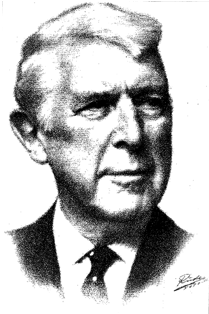
Trygve Hoff

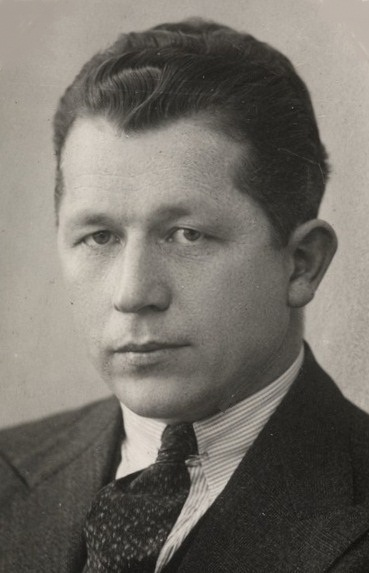
Torolv Kandahl

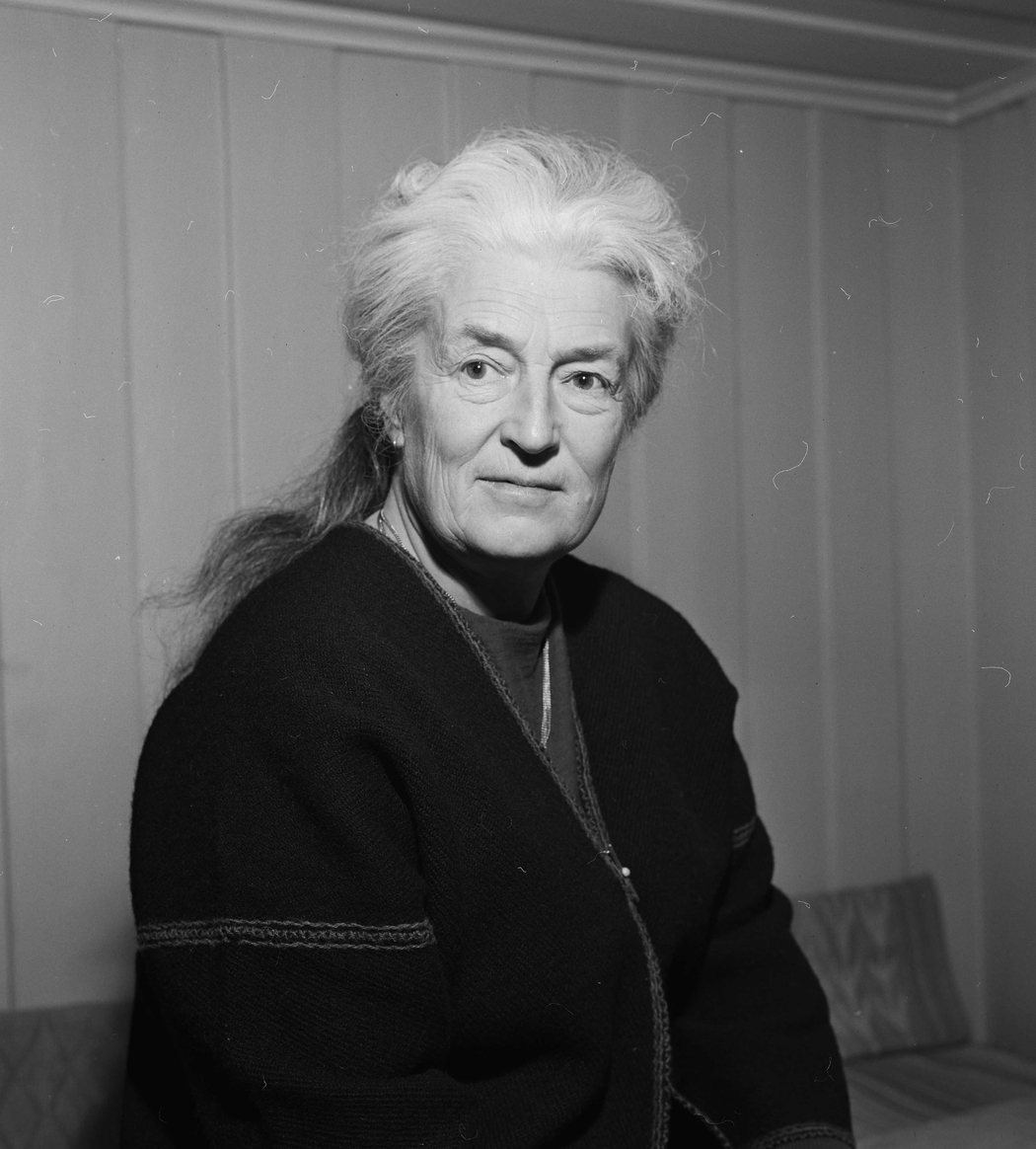
Sigrun Berg

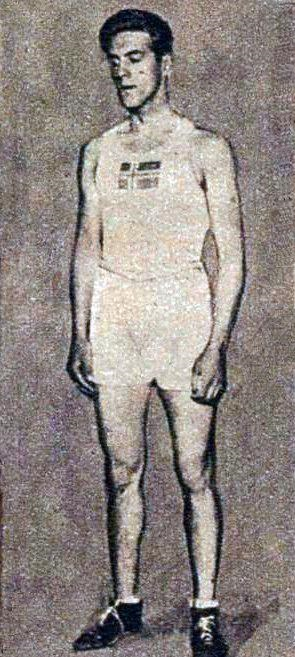
Otto von Porat

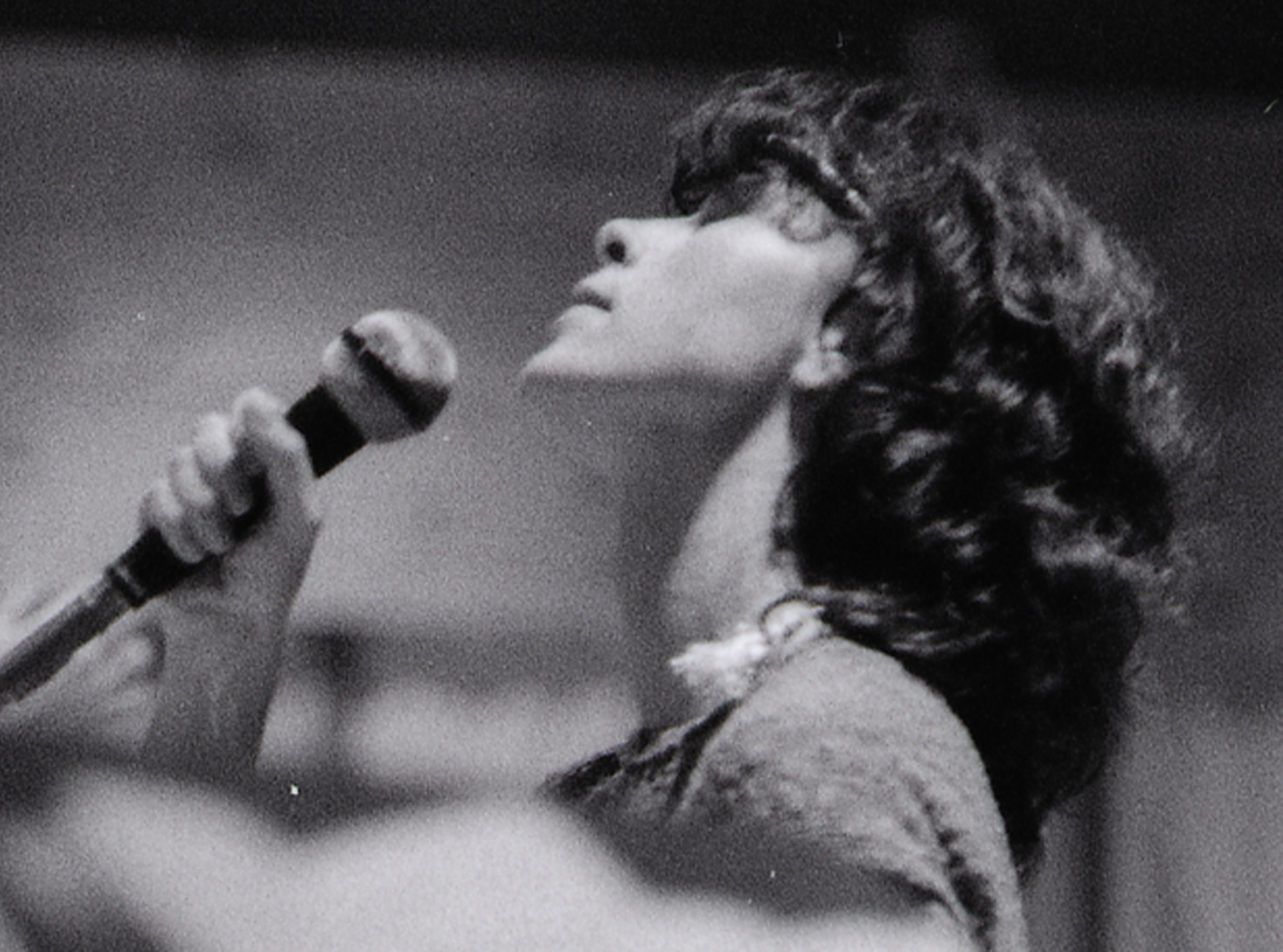
Radka Toneff

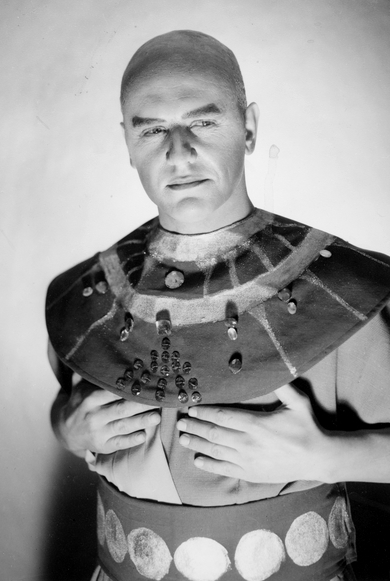
Jonas Brunvoll Jr.

- 3 January – Inger Haldorsen, physician, midwife and politician (born 1899)
- 4 January – Trygve Hoff, businessman, writer and editor (born 1895)
- 4 January – Ragnhild Hartmann Varmbo, politician (born 1886)
- 5 January – Thomas Stang, forester and businessperson (born 1897)
- 8 January – Bjarne Støtvig, politician (born 1898)
- 14 January – Ragnar Larsen, international soccer player, manager and journalist (born 1925)
- 22 January – Arne Lie, actor (born 1921)
- 24 January – Nils Sletbak, jurist and theatre director (born 1896)
- 26 January – Hans Jacob Ustvedt, medical doctor and broadcasting administrator (born 1903)
- 1 February – Eilert Bøhm, gymnast (born 1900)
- 1 February – Egil Olbjørn, police leader (born 1902)
- 11 February – Andreas Knudsen, sailor and Olympic silver medallist (born 1887)
- 20 February – Alfhild Hovdan, journalist and tourist manager (born 1904).
- 26 February – Anders Jahre, shipping magnate (born 1891)
- 28 February – Aage Steen, boxer (born 1900)
- 2 March – Inger Alver Gløersen, smallholder and writer (born 1892)
- 5 March – Torolv Kandahl, politician (born 1899)
- 8 March – Mauritz Amundsen, sport shooter (born 1904).
- 29 March – Karl Aasland, politician (born 1918)
- 2 April – Johan Gørrissen, chemical engineer and industrial leader (born 1907)
- 6 April – Jonas Brunvoll Jr., opera singer and actor (born 1920).
- 8 May – Otto Sverdrup Engelschiøn, marketer, businessperson, resistance member and genealogist (born 1902)
- 9 May – Erling Engan, politician (born 1910)
- 18 May – Sigrun Berg, weaver and textile designer (born 1901).
- 12 June – Per Hansson, journalist (born 1922)
- 22 June – Hjalmar Andresen, footballer (born 1914)
- 27 June – Ingvar Bakken, politician (born 1920)
- 12 July – Arne Askildsen, bailiff and politician (born 1898)
- 12 July – Einar Bergsland, skier (born 1909)
- 16 July – Herman L. Løvenskiold, ornithologist, photographer, government scholar and author on heraldry (born 1897)
- 27 July – Henrik Bahr, judge (born 1902)
- 4 August – Hallvard Rieber-Mohn, writer and Dominican priest (born 1922)
- 13 August – Bjarne Andersen, actor, stage producer and theatre director (born 1909)
- 13 August – Frank Cook, jazz musician and band leader (born 1924)
- 14 August – Harald Rød, farmer and politician (born 1907)
- 27 August – Sverre Udnæs, playwright, dramatist, director and stage producer (born 1939)
- 2 September – Odd Granlund, media personality (born 1910).
- 2 September – Knut Hergel, actor and theatre director (born 1899)
- 19 September – Reidar Lunde, newspaper editor (born 1911)
- 21 September – Georg Hagerup-Larssen, engineer and businessperson (born 1903)
- 1 October – Finn Berstad, footballer (born 1901)
- 1 October – Nils Helgheim, politician (born 1903)
- 9 October – Otto Nielsen, songwriter, revue writer, cabaret singer and radio personality (born 1909)
- 13 October – Kristian Rønneberg, politician (born 1898)
- 14 October – Otto von Porat, heavyweight boxer (born 1903)
- 19 October – Ivar Cederholm, tenor (born 1902)
- 21 October – Radka Toneff, jazz singer (born 1952)
- 31 October – Jacob Ramm, dentist and organizational leader (born 1890)
- 20 November – Odd Hovdenak, civil servant (born 1917)
- 18 December – Joronn Sitje, painter and illustrator (born 1897).
- 19 December – Karen Grønn-Hagen, politician and Minister (born 1903)
- 29 December – Leif Johansen, economist (born 1930)

=== Full date missing ===
- Christian August Anker, businessperson in the paper industry (born 1896)
- Dagfinn Dekke, jurist and civil servant (born 1908)
- Leif O. Foss, trade unionist and politician (born 1899)
- Jens Gram Jr., barrister and politician (born 1897)
- Håkon Robak, forester (born 1905)
- Eivind Tverbak, novelist and children's writer (born 1897)
