= Dagfinn =

Dagfinn is a Norwegian masculine given name. Notable people with the given name include:

- Dagfinn Aarskog (1928–2014), Norwegian physician
- Dagfinn Aarskog (bobsleigh) (born 1973), Norwegian bobsledder
- Dagfinn Bakke (1933–2019), Norwegian painter, illustrator and printmaker
- Dagfinn Dahl (1887–1967), Norwegian barrister
- Dagfinn Dekke (1908–1982), Norwegian jurist and civil servant
- Dagfinn Flem (1906–1976), Norwegian politician, newspaper editor, non-fiction writer and translator
- Dagfinn Føllesdal (1932–2026), Norwegian-American philosopher
- Dagfinn Gedde-Dahl (1937–2016), Norwegian physician
- Dagfinn Grønoset (1920–2008), Norwegian journalist and writer
- Dagfinn Habberstad (born 1941), Norwegian trade unionist and civil servant
- Dagfinn Hauge (1908–2007), Norwegian writer and Lutheran bishop
- Dagfinn Hjertenes (1943–2006), Norwegian politician
- Dagfinn Høybråten (born 1957), Norwegian politician
- Dagfinn Kjeholt (1912–2005), Norwegian naval officer
- Dagfinn Koch (born 1964), Norwegian musician
- Dagfinn Loen, Norwegian curler
- Dagfinn Mannsåker (1916–1994), Norwegian archivist and historian
- Dagfinn Næss (1934–2008), Norwegian boxer
- Dagfinn Olsen, Norwegian orienteering competitor
- Dagfinn Henrik Olsen (born 1966), Norwegian politician
- Dagfinn Stenseth (1936–2019), Norwegian diplomat
- Dagfinn Sundsbø (born 1946), Norwegian politician
- Dagfinn Tveito (1927–2015), Norwegian magazine editor
- Dagfinn Vårvik (1924–2018), Norwegian politician

== See also ==
- Dagfin (given name)
