= Haldorsen =

Haldorsen is a surname. Notable people with the surname include:

- Finn Haldorsen (1934–2005), Norwegian businessman
- Haldor Andreas Haldorsen (1883–1965), Norwegian politician
- Inger Haldorsen (1899–1982), Norwegian physician, midwife and politician
- Magne Haldorsen (1925–2005), Norwegian politician
- Ola Haldorsen (born 1965), Norwegian footballer
