= Runar (name) =

Runar (and its Icelandic version Rúnar) is a masculine given name and a surname which is used in Nordic countries. It became one of the popular names in Norway from the 1950s. Its meaning in Old Icelandic is wisdom and magical characters or signs.

Notable people with the name include:

== Given name ==
=== First name ===
- Rúnar Örn Ágústsson (born 1985), Icelandic road cyclist
- Rúnar Alexandersson (born 1977), Icelandic artistic gymnast
- Runar Bauer (born 1952), Norwegian handball player
- Runar Berg (born 1970), Norwegian football player
- Runar Collander (1894–1973), Finnish botanist
- Runar Espejord (born 1996), Norwegian football player
- Runar Filper (born 1964), Swedish politician
- Rúnar Freyr Gíslason (born 1973), Icelandic actor and voice actor
- Runar Granholm (1889–1937), Finnish tennis player
- Runar Hauge (born 2001), Norwegian football player
- Runar Holmberg (1923–1993), Finnish sprinter
- Runar Hove (born 1995), Norwegian football player
- Runar Jørstad (born 1982), Norwegian journalist
- Rúnar Júlíusson (1945–2008), Icelandic musical artist
- Rúnar Kárason (born 1988), Icelandic handball player
- Runar Karlsson (born 1953), Finnish politician
- Rúnar Kristinsson (born 1969), Icelandic football player
- Runar Norheim (born 2005), Norwegian football player
- Runar Normann (born 1978), Norwegian football player
- Runar Patriksson (born 1944), Swedish politician
- Rúnar Rúnarsson (born 1977), Icelandic screenwriter and director
- Rúnar Alex Rúnarsson (born 1995), Icelandic football player
- Runar Sandström (1909–1985), Swedish water polo player
- Runar Schildt (1888–1925), Swedish-speaking Finnish author
- Rúnar Sigtryggsson (born 1972), Icelandic handball player
- Rúnar Þór Sigurgeirsson (born 1999), Icelandic football player
- Rúnar Már Sigurjónsson (born 1990), Icelandic football player
- Runar Sjåstad (born 1968), Norwegian politician
- Runar Søgaard (born 1967), Norwegian leadership trainer
- Runar Steinstad (born 1967), Norwegian Paralympian athlete
- Runar Tafjord (born 1957), Norwegian French horn player
- Rúnar Vilhjálmsson (1950–1970), Icelandic multi-sport athlete

=== Middle name ===
- Andri Rúnar Bjarnason (born 1990), Icelandic football player
- Gísli Rúnar Jónsson (1953–2020), Icelandic actor
- Sveinn Rúnar Sigurðsson (born 1976), Icelandic musical artist and physician

== Surname ==
- Tommy Runar (born 1982), Norwegian football player
