= Mannsåker =

Mannsåker is a Norwegian surname. Notable people with the surname include:

- Dagfinn Mannsåker (1916–1994), Norwegian archivist and historian
- Jon Jørundson Mannsåker (1880–1964), Norwegian priest and politician
