= Rustadstuen =

Rustadstuen is a Norwegian surname. Notable people with the surname include:

- Arne Rustadstuen (1905–1978), Norwegian skier
- Pål Rustadstuen (born 1982), Norwegian footballer
