= Eirik Bertheussen =

Norwegian football defender (born 1984)

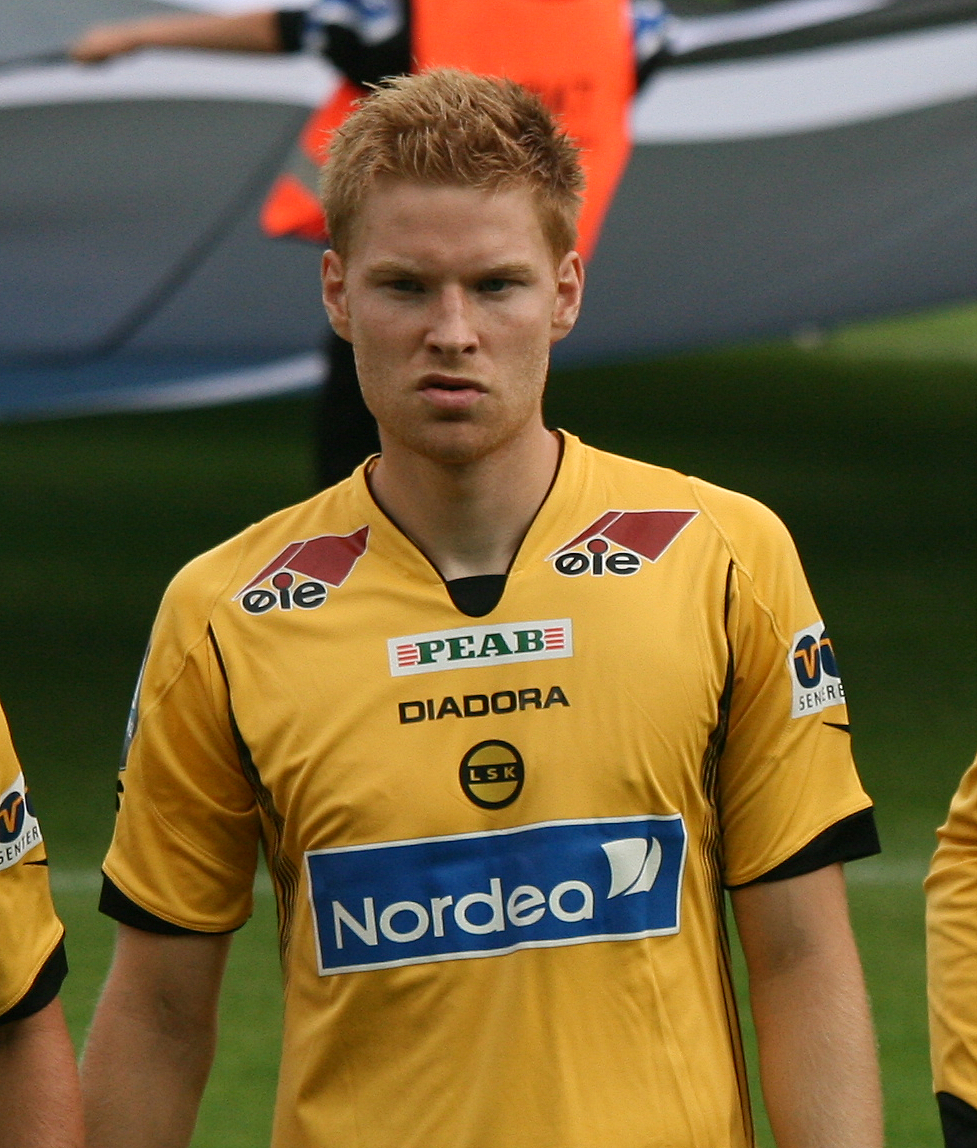

Personal information
- Date of birth: 2 April 1984 (age 42)
- Place of birth: Tromsø, Norway
- Height: 1.85 m (6 ft 1 in)
- Position: Central defender

Youth career
- Tromsdalen

Senior career*
Years	Team	Apps	(Gls)
2001–2002	Tromsdalen	30	(2)
2003	Tromsø	3	(0)
2004	→ Tromsdalen (loan)	25	(2)
2005	→ Pors Grenland (loan)	27	(1)
2006–2009	Lillestrøm	10	(0)
2009	→ Tromsdalen (loan)	27	(1)
2010–2015	Tromsdalen	130	(14)
2016	Senja	23	(0)
2018	Lyngen/Karnes	0	(0)

International career
2002	Norway U18	10	(3)
2003	Norway U19	8	(1)
2003–2005	Norway U21	3	(0)
- * Club domestic league appearances and goals

Eirik Bertheussen (born 2 April 1984) is a Norwegian football defender.

He played at Norway's top level for Tromsø in 2003 and for Lillestrøm in 2006, 2007 and 2008. He played several full seasons in the 1. divisjon, mostly for Tromsdalen UIL.

In 2017, he was announced as coach for FK Senja. His responsibility was to train a part of the team, namely the group of players who resided in Tromsø. In May 2017, the head coach left Senja, and Bertheussen became caretaker assistant under Kjetil Warholm. In 2018, Bertheussen was brought to Lyngen/Karnes by their coach, an old teammate Ole Talberg. Bertheussen only played in the cup preliminary round.

== Career statistics ==
Club	Season	Division	League		Cup		Total	
Club	Season	Division	Apps	Goals	Apps	Goals	Apps	Goals
2001	Tromsdalen	1. divisjon	11	1	0	0	11	1
2002	Tromsdalen	1. divisjon	19	1	1	0	20	1
2003	Tromsø	Tippeligaen	3	0	1	0	4	0
2004	Tromsdalen	1. divisjon	25	2	1	0	25	2
2005	Pors	1. divisjon	27	1	3	0	27	1
2006	Lillestrøm	Tippeligaen	0	0	0	0	0	0
2007	Lillestrøm	Tippeligaen	1	0	0	0	1	0
2008	Lillestrøm	Tippeligaen	9	0	1	0	10	0
2009	Tromsdalen	1. divisjon	27	1	1	1	28	2
2010	Tromsdalen	1. divisjon	24	2	3	1	27	3
2011	Tromsdalen	2. divisjon	25	3	1	0	26	3
2012	Tromsdalen	1. divisjon	23	2	3	0	26	2
2013	Tromsdalen	2. divisjon	21	4	2	0	23	4
2014	Tromsdalen	1. divisjon	24	2	2	0	26	2
2015	Tromsdalen	2. divisjon	13	1	2	0	15	1
2016	Senja	2. divisjon	22	0	1	0	23	0
Career Total			274	20	22	2	286	22

== Personal life ==
Eirik Bertheussen is a younger brother of Tommy Bertheussen (born 23 February 1973), a goalkeeper. Tommy started his youth career in IF Skarp, until he moved to Tromsdalen in his late childhood and joined Tromsdalen UIL. He spent most of his senior career in Tromsdalen, except for a spell when he studied at Bodø University College and played for FK Gevir Bodø. In 2003, he was signed by first-tier club Tromsø IL, appearing in three games in the 2003 Tippeligaen. He retired following that season. His nickname was "Tiger-Tommy" or "Tiger'n", playing on "Tommy og Tiger'n" which is the Norwegian name of Calvin and Hobbes. Outside of football, Tommy worked in Norges Råfisklag before starting his own accounting firm.
