= Tysland =

Tysland is a surname. Notable people with the surname include:

- Georg Tysland (1890–1932), Norwegian engineer and metallurgist
- Kelly Stephens-Tysland (born 1983), American ice hockey player
- Terje Tysland (born 1951), Norwegian singer, songwriter, guitarist, and accordion player
