= Río Chira (ship) =

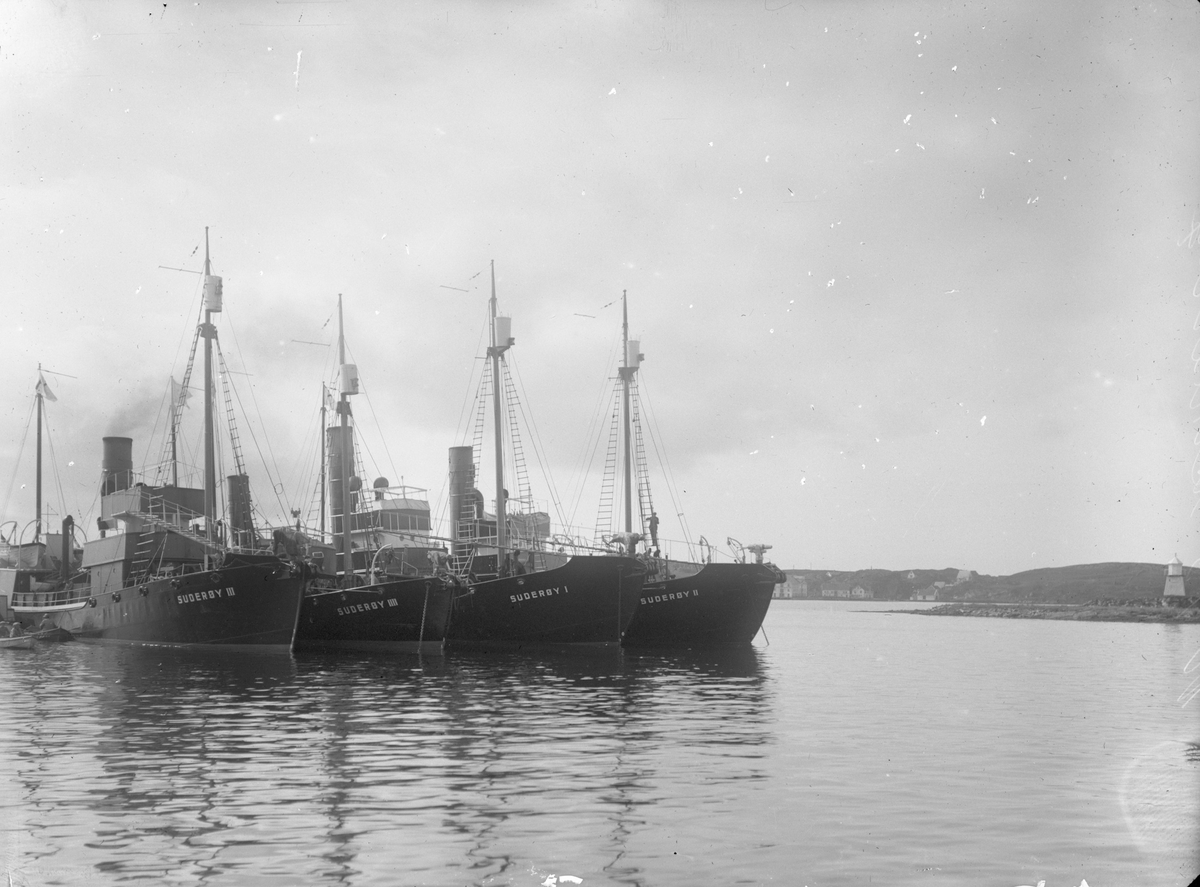
- Suderøy I-IV whale catchers in the 1930s

History

Norway / Peru / Germany
- Name: Viking II (1914-25); Río Chira (1925-28); Angola (1928-29); Suderøy III (1929-37); Landanes (1937-40, 1945-68); NS 09 Sindbad (1940-45); Fraktfem (1968-69, 1972-74); Eva Karin (1969-72); Transport (1974-81)
- Builder: Kaldnes Mekaniske Verksted, Tønsberg, Norway
- Yard number: 32
- Completed: September 1914
- Fate: Stripped and scuttled, 6 April 1983

General characteristics
- Tonnage: Originally 199 GRT, later 245 GRT
- Length: 115 ft 2 in (35.10 m) o/a; 106 ft 8 in (32.51 m) p/p
- Beam: 21 ft 6 in (6.55 m)
- Depth: 13 ft 7 in (4.14 m)
- Propulsion: 550 ihp (410 kW) triple expansion steam engine (1914-37); 160 bhp (119 kW) Wichmann diesel engine (1937-38); 300 bhp (224 kW) 3-cylinder Wichmann diesel engine (1938-55); 420 bhp (313 kW) 6-cylinder Vølund diesel engine (1955-82)

Río Chira was 199-ton steel-hulled vessel with a long and varied history, serving under several names as a whaler, fishing boat, naval patrol boat, passenger/cargo ship and freighter between 1914 and 1981.

== Ship history ==
The ship was built in Norway by Kaldnes Mekaniske Verksted of Tønsberg, and delivered in September 1914 to the whaling company A/S Tønsberg Hvalfangeri as the Viking II. In 1925 she was sold to Cia Ballenera del Peru of Callao, Peru, and renamed Río Chira. In January 1928 the ship returned to Norwegian ownership when she was sold to Knutsen O.A.S. Shipping AS and renamed Angola to sail from Praia Amelia near Mossamedes in Angola. In August 1929 she was renamed Suderøy III.

In January 1937 she was taken out of whaling service, fitted with a new 160 bhp Wichmann engine, and converted to a seiner under the name Landanes. In 1938 a new 300 bhp 3-cylinder Wichmann engine was installed, and from 1939 she was used to transport the crews of the company's ships calling at Scandinavian ports.

During the German occupation of Norway in World War II the ship was requisitioned by the Kriegsmarine and as NS 09 Sindbad was stationed as a patrol boat in Stavanger, serving as part of 51. Vorpostenflottille ("51st Guard Flotilla").

The ship was returned to Knutsens after the war. By early 1946 she was being operated by Haugesund Dampskibsselskap ("Haugesund Steamship Company"), as a replacement ship. In 1947 she was converted to a passenger and cargo ship, and under a bareboat charter served with Haugesund Dampskibsselskab on the regular service between Haugesund and Bergen. She also served on the Haugesund-Ryfylke and Haugesund-Stavanger routes.

The ship was rebuilt at Frederikshavn in Denmark in 1955, increasing from 199 to 245 GRT, and being fitted with a 420 bhp 6-cylinder Vølund engine. From 1964, as newer ships came into service, Landanes was mostly used as a reserve ship, and was eventually sold in January 1968 to A/S Haugesund Slip, converted into a freighter and renamed Fraktfem. In December 1969 she was sold to Gudmund & Hansen of Svolvær for coastal service, and renamed Eva Karin. However the company went bankrupt, and in November 1972 she was returned to Haugesund Slip, and reverted to the name Fraktfem.

In February 1974 she was sold to Fraktsenter A/S of Haugesund, renamed Transport, and employed in the local sand trade. She was sold in May 1976 to Nils Nilsen of Bodø, to serve in the sand trade in Nordland. In 1977 she ran aground at Godøystraumen, but suffered no major damage. However, the elderly ship was finally condemned in late 1981 and laid up. She was sold in May 1982 to Julius Solnes of Borkenes, and towed to Harstad where her engines were stripped out for use in another ship, and the hull was sunk near Svartskjær off Harstad on 6 April 1983.
