= Georg Tysland =

Norwegian engineer

Georg Jacob Tysland (13 February 1890 – 14 February 1932) was a Norwegian engineer and metallurgist. Tysland is known as the originator of a successful electric smelting furnace for the production of pig iron, a semi-finished product for the production of steel.

== Biography ==
He was born in Kristiania (now Oslo), Norway. He was a son of colonel Lars Jørgen Tysland (1848–1911) and Marie Cathrine Sandberg (1862–1942). He was a maternal grandson of military officer Ole Rømer Sandberg (1831–1899) and cousin of legislator Ole Rømer Aagaard Sandberg (1900–1985).

He grew up in Kristiania and Bergen, and graduated from Bergen tekniske skole in 1908 before finishing his secondary education at Bergen Cathedral School in 1910. He graduated from the University of Liège in Belgium during 1913.

He was a manager at Tinfos Jernverk in Notodden from 1913 to 1916, and then spent half a year in the United States, a stay interrupted by rheumatic fever. Back in Norway he established Skaland Grafittverk in Senja during 1918, was hired in the Ministry of Trade in 1921 and then in Fiskaa Verk in Kristiansand during 1922.

He was next hired to experiment with new electric smelting furnaces. The Tysland-Hole Furnace (Tysland-Hole-ovnen) was first erected at Christiania Spigerverk in 1928 and was put on use in 1929. The Tysland-Hole furnace was developed by Tysland jointly with engineer Ivar Hole (1882–1939). Railway rails and reinforcing steel become main products produced.

Tysland worked at Christiania Spigerverk from 1924 to 1927, Bremanger Smelteverk in Svelgen from 1927 to 1931, then Skaland Grafittverk in Skaland from 1931 to his death from heart failure.
