= Gunnar Mjånes =

Norwegian politician

- Born: 17 April 1921; Stord Municipality, Norway
- Died: 2 November 2002 (aged 81)
- Occupation: Politician

Gunnar Mjånes (17 April 1921 – 2 November 2002) was a Norwegian politician.

He was elected deputy representative to the Storting for the periods 1965–1969 and 1969–1973 for the Christian Democratic Party. He replaced Bergfrid Fjose at the Storting from October 1972 to September 1973.
