= Thale (film) =

- 2012 theatrical poster
- Directed by: Aleksander L. Nordaas
- Written by: Aleksander L. Nordaas
- Produced by: Bendik Heggen Strønstad
- Starring: Silje Reinåmo; Erlend Nervold; Jon Sigve Skard
- Cinematography: Aleksander L. Nordaas
- Edited by: Aleksander L. Nordaas
- Music by: Raymond Enoksen; Geirmund Simonsen
- Release date: February 17, 2012
- Running time: 76 minutes
- Country: Norway
- Language: Norwegian
- Budget: $10,000

Thale is a 2012 Norwegian supernatural horror film directed and written by Aleksander L. Nordaas. The film was released in Norway on February 17, 2012, with a following worldwide release, sold to over 50 countries.

== Plot ==
Elvis and Leo run a crime scene cleanup business and are hired to clean up after a death, when they discover Thale, a female humanoid creature with a cow's tail that appears to be incapable of human speech, hidden in a basement. Playing a tape left behind by her captor, Elvis and Leo learn of her life in captivity, and that she has been the subject of medical experimentation. Later, paramilitary soldiers come to recapture Thale. Thale's fellow creatures, hulders that are more satyr-like, come to the rescue and leave Elvis and Leo alive. Thale later rejoins the hulders in the wild.

== Cast ==
- Silje Reinåmo as Thale
- Erlend Nervold as Elvis
- Jon Sigve Skard as Leo
- Morten Andresen as Hvittkledd
- Sunniva Lien as Young Thale

== Production ==
Thale was shot on a budget of $10,000. Aleksander L. Nordaas served as the film's writer, director, co-producer, cinematographer, editor, and the set designer. He built the sets and shot most of the film in his father's basement. Nordaas has published a clip on YouTube where he talks a bit about the process.

Thale lead actress Silje Reinåmo commented that she found the role challenging and that the character's nudity made her "very vulnerable and naked, in the true sense".

== Reception ==
Rotten Tomatoes, a review aggregator, reports that 55% of eleven critics gave the film a positive review; the average rating was 6.2/10. Michael Calore of Wired.com called it "a little film" that is "large in scope". Calore wrote, "And while some of the gentler, emotional material falls flat, Thale (pronounced 'tall-eh') does prod the brain and the heart enough for me to recommend it." In a mixed review, John Anderson of Variety called it creepy but "too wordy by half, saying what it should be showing." Owen Williams of Empire wrote that the film is "beautifully enigmatic and eerie" and Mark L. Miller of Ain't It Cool News said that it is "a truly unique and amazing film". John DeFore of The Hollywood Reporter wrote that film is "intriguing to a point but unable to exploit its mysteries in a satisfying way". Serena Whitney of Dread Central rated it 2.5/5 stars and wrote, "Although Nordaas does a competent job directing an ambitious low-budget indie creature feature with very little money, the laughable social commentary, failed boo scares and unbelievably cheesy ending make Thale a mediocre, yawn-worthy disappointment." Noel Murray of The A.V. Club rated it C− and wrote, "Thale takes over an hour to get to where it should be by the end of the first reel. And then it ends."

Thale won the Best Screenplay ifab Award at the International Film Awards Berlin. It also screened at the Toronto International Film Festival, and later won the Audience Award at Fantasporto Film Festival.

== Sequel ==
A sequel for Thale is under development. It will be co-produced by Epic Pictures and Yesbox Productions. Nordaas is attached as scriptwriter and director.
