= Georg Hagerup-Larssen =

Norwegian engineer and businessperson

Georg Hagerup-Larssen (16 January 1903 – 21 September 1982) was a Norwegian engineer and businessperson.

He was born in Ankenes Municipality. He graduated as an electrical engineer from the Norwegian Institute of Technology in 1928, and after some months in Siemens-Schuckert in Germany he was hired as engineer at Haugvik Smelteverk. In 1936 he was hired in Elektrokemisk (later Elkem). From June 1940, during the Second World War, he was the company's representative in the United States and Canada, fleeing occupied Norway via the Soviet Union and Japan. His main task was to spread the Søderberg electrode technology.

He returned to Norway in 1946. In 1951 he became assisting chief executive, and from 1959 to 1971 he served as the chief executive of Elkem. He succeeded Alf Monrad-Aas. During his time the company established, or participated in establishing, Grong Gruber, Salten Verk, Mosjøen Aluminiumsverk and Lista Aluminiumsverk. Fiskaa Verk was expanded, and the ownership in Sulitjelma Gruber and Porsgrunn Elektrometallurgiske increased. From 1945 to 1971 the number of employees in the Elkem corporation rose from about 200 to about 4,000.

After retiring he was a board member of Elkem until 1975 and chair of Dyno Industrier from 1972. He was a board member of Forsikringsselskapet Norden/Nordengruppen. He was also active in the fledgling Norwegian petroleum industry, in the companies Noco and Saga. He was a board member of the Federation of Norwegian Industries from 1961 to 1965, member of the electoral committee from 1962 to 1966 and of the working committee from 1967 to 1971.

He was decorated as a Commander of the Order of St. Olav. He died in September 1982 and was buried in Ullern.

Business positions
| Preceded by Alf Monrad-Aas | Chief executive of Elkem; 1959–1971 | Succeeded by Karl Lorck |
