= Rubbestadneset =

Village in Bømlo Municipality, Norway

- Village
- Interactive map of Rubbestadneset
- Coordinates: 59.8156°N 5.26809°E
- Country: Norway
- Region: Western Norway
- County: Vestland
- District: Sunnhordland
- Municipality: Bømlo Municipality

Area
  - Total: 1.26 km^{2} (0.49 sq mi)
- Elevation: 16 m (52 ft)

Population (2025)
  - Total: 1,418
  - Density: 1,125/km^{2} (2,910/sq mi)
- Time zone: UTC+01:00 (CET)
  - Summer (DST): UTC+02:00 (CEST)
- Post Code: 5420 Rubbestadneset

Rubbestadneset is a village in Bømlo Municipality in Vestland county, Norway. The village is located on a peninsula on the eastern side of the island of Bømlo, about 6 kilometres (3.7 mi) east of the municipal centre of Svortland. The Stokksund strait lies to the east and the Innværfjorden lies to the south and west.

The 1.26-square-kilometre (310-acre) village has a population (2025) of 1,418 and a population density of 1,125 inhabitants per square kilometre (2,910/sq mi).

Wichmann Diesel motors originate from Rubbestadneset. Rubbestadnes Upper Secondary School is located in the village.

== Notable people ==
- Finn Haldorsen (1934—2005), a businessman
- Knut Arild Hareide (born 1972), a politician
- Martin Sandvik (born 1986), a musician
