= Jon Jørundson Mannsåker =

Norwegian priest and politician

Jon Jørundson Mannsåker (28 September 1880 – 28 February 1964) was a Norwegian priest and politician for the Liberal Party.

== Biography ==
He was born at Odda in Søndre Bergenhus county, Norway. He took an education in theology. He was the headmaster of the Hardanger folk high school (Hardanger folkehøgskule) from 1912 to 1928, and at the same time an auxiliary priest at Ullensvang Church from 1914. In 1928 he became a curate at Voss Church. In 1933 he moved permanently to Oslo to become a curate there. From 1940 to 1950 he served as vicar.

He was elected to the Norwegian Parliament in 1927 and 1930, representing the constituency Hordaland and the Liberal Party. He was a deputy representative to the Norwegian Parliament during the term 1954–1957. He was a minor ballot candidate in the 1957 election.

He was married to Anna Erika Stueland (1881–1966). They were the parents of politician Bergfrid Fjose and historian Dagfinn Mannsåker.
