= Silje Reinåmo =

Norwegian actress, dancer and musical performer

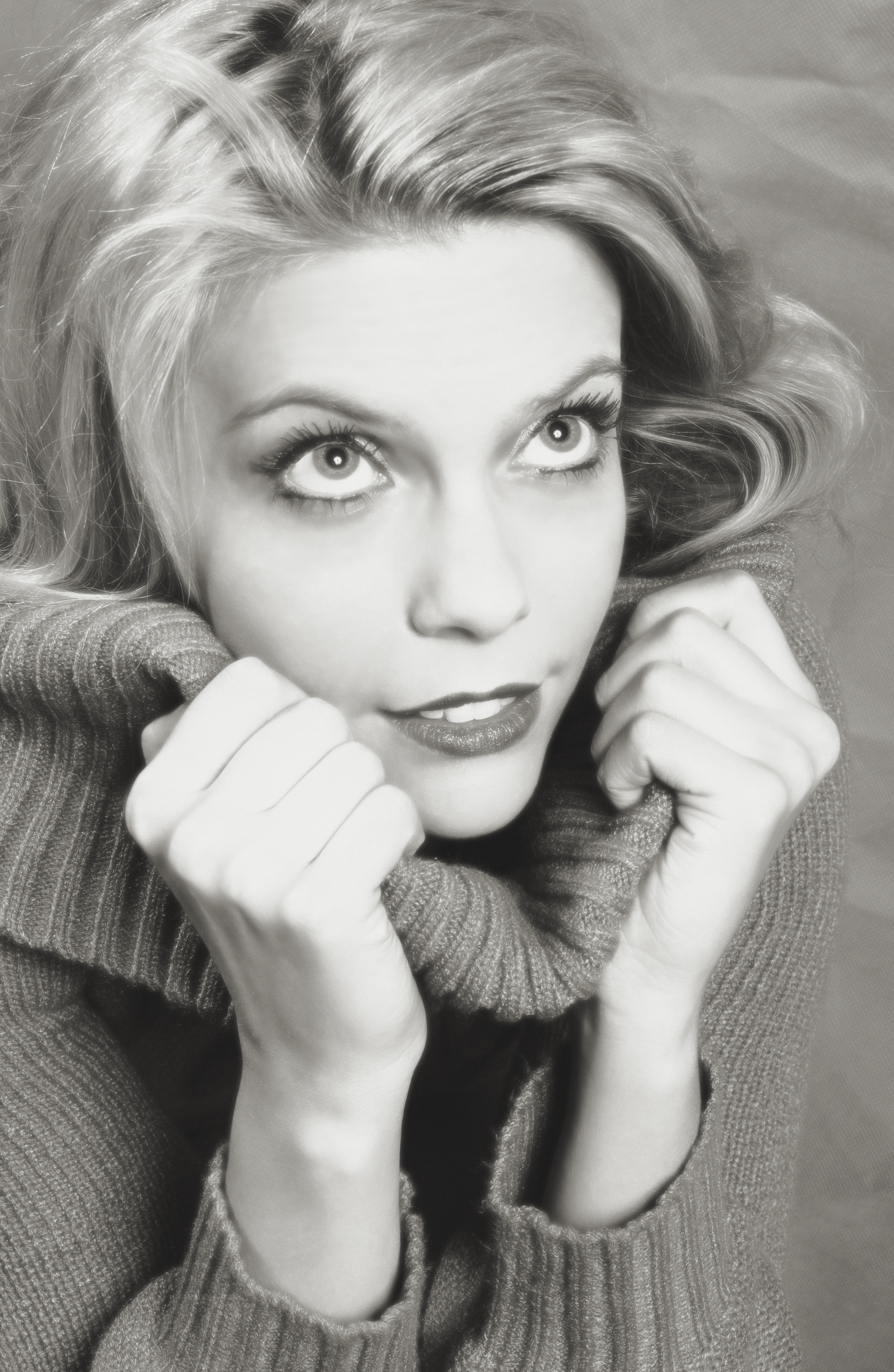
- Silje Reinåmo
- Born: 25 August 1982 (age 44); Mosjøen, Norway
- Education: Guildford School of Acting
- Occupations: Actress, dancer, musical performer

Silje Reinåmo (born 25 August 1982) is a Norwegian actress, dancer, and musical performer.

She was born in Mosjøen and was educated at Bårdar Danseinstitutt in Oslo, and at the Guildford School of Acting in Surrey, England. Reinåmo is perhaps best known for her lead performance in the supernatural horror film Thale and for her portrayal of Solveig in Bentein Baardson's production of Henrik Ibsen's Peer Gynt in Cairo in 2006. She has performed in several productions for television, film and the theatre, notably with a leading role in the short film In Chambers (Norwegian title: Bak lukkede dører), which received an award for Best Short Film at the WT Os international film festival in 2008, as well as awards for Best film and NIFA best film at the Minimalen short film festival in Trondheim in 2009.

== Performances ==
=== Theatre ===
Year	Title	Director	Role
2006	Peer Gynt i Kairo	Bentein Baardson	Solveig
2007	Titus Anatomi	Harald Vallgårda	Lavinia
2010	Elias		Rosa

=== Film ===
Year	Title	Director	Role
2008	In Chambers (Norwegian title: Bak lukkede dører) (short film)	Aleksander L. Nordaas	The Woman
2008	Mamma Mø og kråka (animated film)	Igor Veyshtaguin	The Farmer's Wife (voice)
2009	Zakariassen må dø (short film)	Magne Pettersen	Aud
2012	Thale (feature film)	Aleksander L. Nordaas	Thale

=== Television ===
Year	Title	Director	Role
2006	Peer Gynt i Kairo (adapted for TV, released on DVD)	Stein-Roger Bull	Solveig
2008	Animalia (animated series)	David Scott, James Cameron	Bitzy, Zee, Melba Musvik (voices)
2008	Bratz: The Movie		Ms. Calabash (voice)
