= Innværfjorden =

Fjord in Vestland, Norway

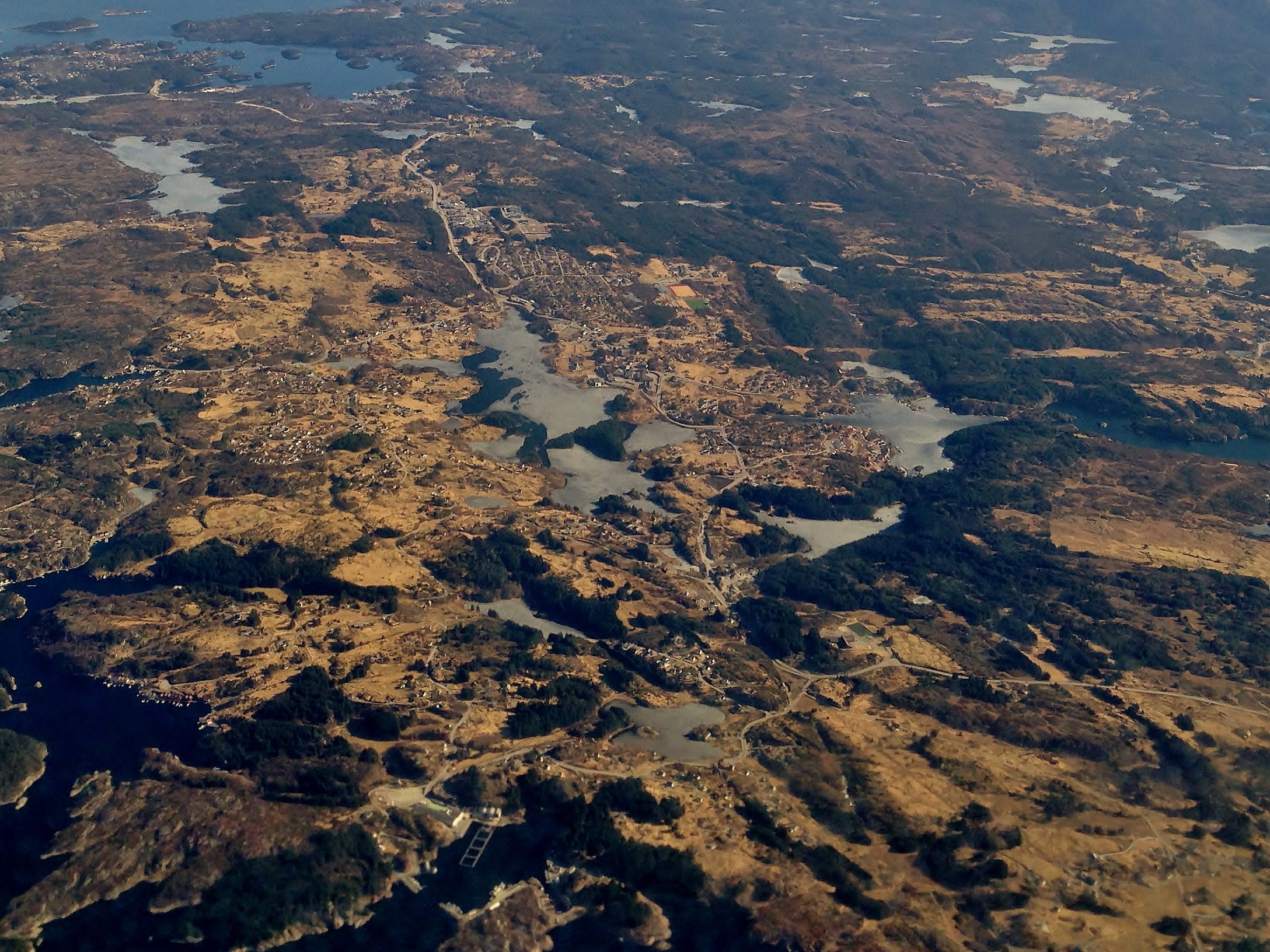
- View of the fjord (top, left part of the picture)
- Interactive map of the fjord
- Location: Vestland county, Norway
- Coordinates: 59.8024°N 5.2624°E
- Type: Fjord
- Primary outflows: Stokksund
- Basin countries: Norway
- Max. length: 3.5 kilometres (2.2 mi)
- Settlements: Rubbestadneset

Innværfjorden is a small fjord in Bømlo Municipality in Vestland county, Norway. It lies on the south of the village of Rubbestadneset on the eastern side of the island of Bømlo. The 3.5-kilometre-long (2.2 mi) fjord flows to the west from the Stokksund strait.

The Innværfjorden stretches west from the island of Osparøya between Justenakken and Rubbestadneset and then heads a little southwest. The outermost part of the fjord is about as long as it is wide, and on the south side lies Klenesvågen and Ekornsætre. Along the west side of the fjord lies the small village of Innvær, after which the fjord is named. Between the villages of Innvær and Rubbestadneset, a small, narrow arm of the fjord stretches about 1.5 kilometres (0.93 mi) northwards to Stangarvågen. A 15-metre-long (49 ft) bridge that is part of County Road 541 crosses this arm of the fjord on its way to the village of Rubbestadneset.

== See also ==
- List of Norwegian fjords
