= Bergfrid Fjose =

Norwegian politician

Minister of Social Affairs
- In office 18 October 1972 – 16 October 1973
- Prime Minister: Lars Korvald
- Preceded by: Odd Højdahl
- Succeeded by: Sonja Ludvigsen

Member of the Norwegian Parliament
- In office 1 October 1969 – 30 September 1977
- Constituency: Hordaland

Personal details
- Born: Bergfrid Mannsåker; 31 March 1915 Ullensvang, Hordaland, Norway
- Died: 13 May 2004 (aged 89) Voss, Hordaland, Norway
- Party: Christian Democratic
- Spouse: Olav Fjose (m. 1940)

Bergfrid Fjose (31 March 1915 – 13 May 2004) was a Norwegian politician for the Christian Democratic Party.

She was born in Ullensvang Municipality as the daughter of priest and politician Jon Mannsåker; her brother was the historian Dagfinn Mannsåker. She enrolled as a student in 1935, took the teacher's examination in 1938 and worked as a teacher at Valdres folk high school from 1938 to 1943. From 1943 to 1945 she was a refugee in Sweden due to the occupation of Norway by Nazi Germany. From 1947 to 1949 she worked in Kvam Municipality. She was elected to the municipal council of Kvam Municipality, serving from 1951 to 1952. She then worked in Voss Municipality from 1952 to 1957, and in Årdal Municipality from 1959 to 1967. She was member of the municipal council of Årdal Municipality from 1959 to 1963 and on the municipal council of Fana Municipality from 1967 to 1971. From 1968 to 1969 she chaired the local party chapter.

She was elected to the Norwegian Parliament from Hordaland in 1969, and was re-elected on one occasion. During this period she was the leader of the informal parliamentary temperance and nynorsk groups. From 1972 to 1973 she was the Minister of Social Affairs, as a part of the cabinet Korvald. During her time in cabinet she was replaced in the Norwegian Parliament by Gunnar Mjånes and, briefly, Magne Haldorsen. During her period in office, she was responsible for the Vinmonopolet. During this time, the wine monopoly introduced unmarked gray plastic bags for the sake of anonymity; these were teasingly nicknamed "fjose-pose" ("Fjose bags").

Fjose had been a member of the board of Vinmonopolet from 1964 to 1978. She was also active in Noregs Mållag, Aksjonen mot Atomvåpen and other organizations, and from 1989 to 1991 she was a member of the National Council for Senior Citizens.

Political offices
| Preceded by Odd Højdahl | Norwegian Minister of Social Affairs; 1972–1973 | Succeeded by Sonja Ludvigsen |
