= Sverre Udnæs =

Norwegian playwright, dramatist, director and stage producer

- Born: 20 September 1939; Oslo, Norway
- Died: 27 August 1982 (aged 42)
- Occupation(s): playwright, dramatist, director and stage producer

Sverre Udnæs (20 September 1939 – 27 August 1982) was a Norwegian playwright, dramatist, director and stage producer. He directed a wide range of performances for both television and theater and served as an artistic adviser for the National Theater (Nationaltheatret).

== Biography ==
Udnæs was born in Oslo, Norway. He was the son of Hans Udnæs (1892–1973) and Astrid Wium (1903–96). He was educated at the Oslo Cathedral School. In 1960, he got a job at the Norwegian Broadcasting Corporation (NRK). In 1963 he became a producer for NRK and in 1967 director. He wrote and produced for radio and television, in particular at Radioteatret and Fjernsynsteatret.

From 1978 he was an artistic advisor and director at Nationaltheatret. His plays were staged at various theatres, including Nationaltheatret, Det Norske Teatret and Oslo Nye Teater. His play I dette hvite lyset from 1976 was basis for the 1977 drama film Øyeblikket.
