= Finn Haldorsen =

Norwegian businessman (1934–2005)

Finn Haldorsen (5 September 1934 – February 4, 2005) was a Norwegian-born businessman.

Finn Haldorsen was born in 1934 in Rubbestadneset, Norway, to Haldor Haldorsen and Anne Serine Haldorsen. After his military service, he graduated from the University of Cardiff in 1961 in mechanical engineering, before returning to Norway to work at his father's engine factory.

Haldorsen was best known for starting the Rubb Group in Norway in 1968. Rubb Group was named for his home town of Rubbestadneset. Haldorsen's goal was to build a fabric covered building that would withstand the harsh Norwegian climate. His success with this effort lead to him moving to England to start Rubb Buildings Ltd. in 1977. When this company was firmly established under the leadership of Bill Wood, he moved to Maine, and established Rubb Inc. in the United States which today is under the leadership of David C. Nickerson.

Haldorsen was married, and had 3 sons and 1 daughter.
