= Magne Haldorsen =

Norwegian politician

- Born: 31 October 1925; Bømlo Municipality, Norway
- Died: 24 November 2005 (aged 80)
- Occupation: Politician

Magne Haldorsen (31 October 1925 – 24 November 2005) was a Norwegian politician.

He was elected deputy representative to the Storting for the period 1973–1977 for the Christian Democratic Party. He replaced Bergfrid Fjose at the Storting in October 1973.
