= Hanneli Mustaparta =

Norwegian photographer, writer and model

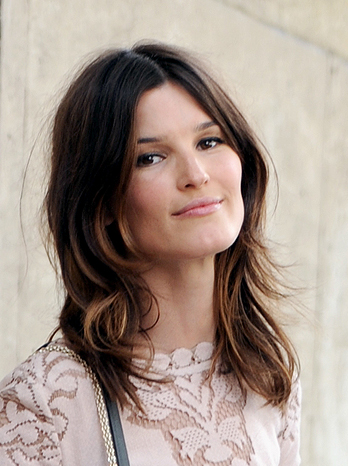
- Born: 13 October 1982; Bærum

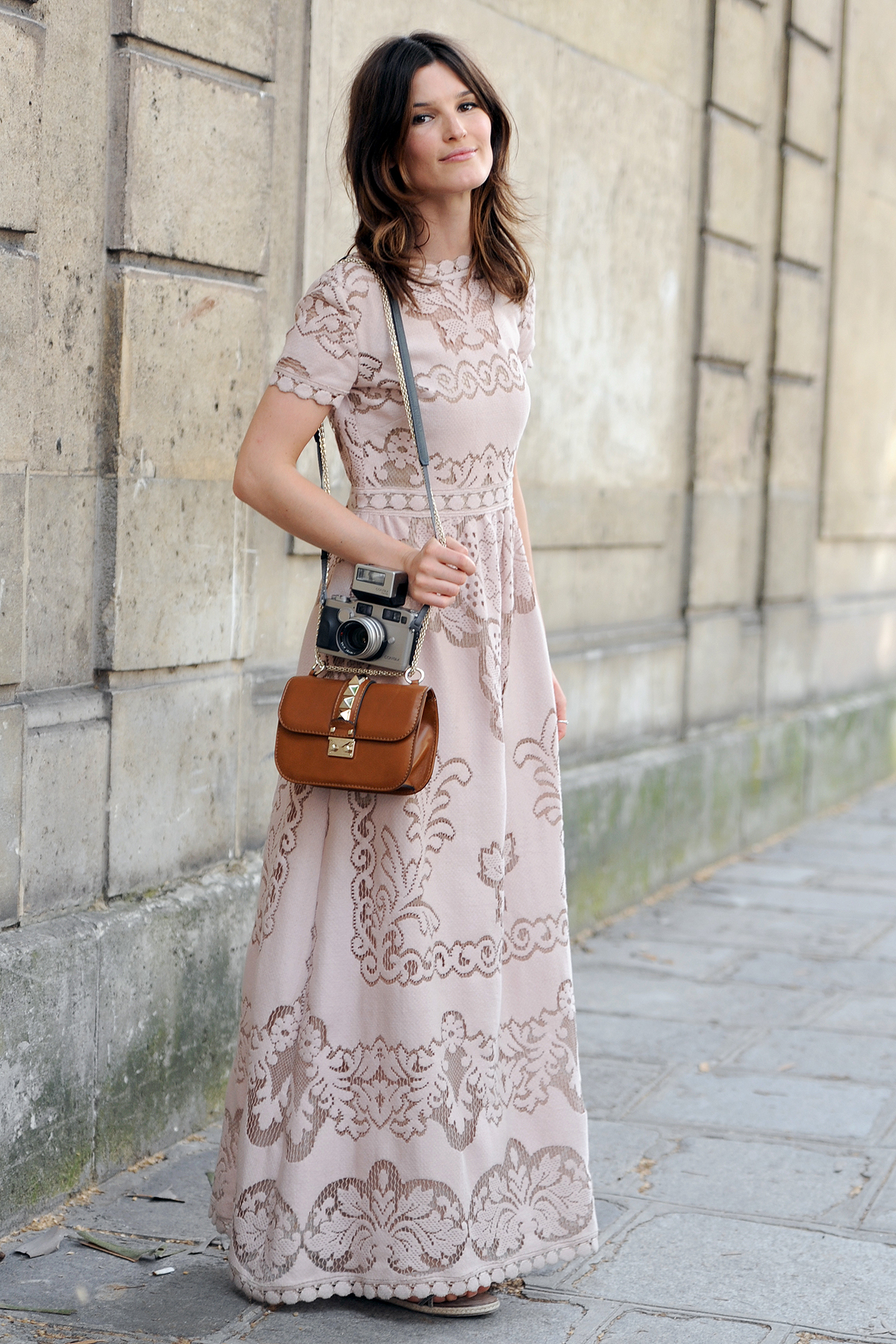
Hanneli Mustaparta during Paris Haute Couture Shows 2012.

Hanneli Mustaparta (born 13 October 1982 in Bærum, Norway) is a photographer, fashion blogger, stylist and former model. She is the creator of fashion blog Hanneli and is a Vogue contributor. She was discovered at the age of 17 by the fashion photographer Per Heimly in 1999. She is the sister of Dimmu Borgir's ex keyboardist Øyvind Johan Mustaparta aka Mustis

== Online career ==
Some of Hanneli's projects have been a featured in Vogue's 2010 "Best Dressed Issue", styling for H&M's "Womenswear and Menswear Styling Session", an interview with Vogue Italia's Editor-in-Chief Franca Sozzani, and a position as co-host with Vogue's editor-at-large and America's Next Top Model judge André Leon Talley for the CBS webcast "Fashion’s Night Out". In early 2011, the international clothing brand Zara licensed and issued several ‘Hanneli Mustaparta’ self-portrait T-shirts in four variations. Zara's first edition of the T-shirts totaled 160,000 units, which were sold in Zara shops around the world.

== See also ==
- Glamourina
- Elin Kling
