= Gjøran Sæther =

Norwegian artist and painter

- Born: December 19, 1982 (age 43)

Gjøran Sæther (December 19, 1982), also known by the pseudonyms Proteque and Skuggimaðr, is a Norwegian artist and painter. He is active in the digital art scene with music and graphic, and as a painter in traditional art.

In 2017, he joined the blackened death metal band Hateful Transgression as keyboardist.

== Biography ==
Sæther was born on 19 December 1982 in Molde, Norway.

== Traditional art ==
His style is very dark and expressive with references to the dark paths in life. According to art pages his style falls under Expressionism.

== Digital Art ==
Sæther participates in the digital art community and the demoscene movement under the pseudonym Proteque. He has created art with old computers like Commodore 64, Atari ST and Amiga 500. He is most active working with Atari computers in a group of artists named Dead Hackers Society. As in his painting his style in digital art is somewhat dark and shows the dark sides of life. Some of his work can be seen on artsites like Artcity and the homepage of Dead Hackers Society.

== Music and sound ==
The name Proteque is also used in his sound and music productions. The music is mostly in the genres Dark Ambient, Experimental and Industrial Ambient. He started making music on old computers like Amiga 500 with the name Fantaprod. Later he joined the group System Talayout where the name Proteque was first used. Later on Sæther started making music and soundscapes with sequencers and synthesizers. His style in synthesizer music is rather towards cinematic. Sæther is also a part of the Ambient Industrial group named Orbitoclast.

Amanita was his first EP and was released by Dead Hackers Society on Atari Falcon as a music disk and in music stores March 2010. The second release The album Smell of old electronics was his first album and was released in June 2011 both on CD and as digital download. Through My Eyes (EP) and The Point Of Regret (Album) followed as digital downloads, before the next full album release which was Screaming Silently that also was released on a limited CD release and as digital download.

Sæther has also created the soundscape for the short movie The World Must Burn by the Finish artist Pilvari Pirtola. The short movie was shown first at Solskogen 2011 and then in the screening of experimental movies on Thursday 10.11.2011 at Helsinki Short Film Festival.

== Album and EP releases in chronological order ==
- March 2010 - Amanita (EP)
- June 2011 - Smell of old electronics (Album)
- October 2011 - Through my eyes (Album)
- January 2012 - The Point of Regret (EP)
- July 2012 - Screaming Silently (Album)
- October 2012 - Glittering Concrete (EP)
- December 2012 - Innoverpust frå ei frosen brud (coop with poet Øystein Hauge) (EP)
- February 2013 - The Inner Calm (EP)
- April 2013 - Demons Will Bring Us Together (EP)
- August 2013 - Sjelemesse (Album)
- March 2014 - Truth (EP)
- July 2014 - Fragile (Album)

== Releases through labels and collections ==
- July 2012 - Forty Five Degrees by various artists (dark ambient collection released from Tufs)
- December 2012 - Operation Payload (WW 3-album about the war that never was. Released by Grimtown Records)
