= Wichmann Diesel =

Wichmann Diesel was a Norwegian diesel engine manufacturer. Once the largest engine producer in Norway, the company was taken over in 1986 by Wärtsilä. Today the site in Rubbestadneset remains the headquarters of Wärtsilä Norway with a repair yard and a museum.

== History ==
Wichmann Diesel was started by Martines Haldorsen, a local blacksmith in Rubbestadneset on the island of Bømlo in Norway. His son, Haldor Andreas Haldorsen constructed the first engine, a single-cylinder 2 hp two-stroke engine in 1903. The engine was installed in his own boat with a controllable-pitch propeller and proved to be a success. Local people soon gathered around the workshop to have the blacksmith make them one. The company, renamed Haldorsen & Sønner Motorfrabrikk, expanded and by 1913 employed 50 people. The name again changed, to Wichmann Diesel.

A large expansion of the factory between 1974 and 1976 saw staff increasing to 520. However, this coincided with a downturn in the shipping industry, with demand for ship engines dwindling. The company went bankrupt in 1978, but Norwegian public money ensured that production continued without interruption for a time.

The LO, a Norwegian labour union, supported the company to develop the new model range. However, they pulled the plug after disagreements and suddenly the renowned manufacturer, which had the biggest engine factory in Norway, was again at the edge of bankruptcy. The factory changed hands and went bankrupt, before being sold to the Finnish group Wärtsilä in 1986.

Wärtsilä stopped all development and the production of the new WX16V, a 16-cylinder V engine, that was ready to be built. They built the Wichmann under the name Wärtsilä Wichmann, but stopped production when it proved to be more successful than their own engines. The last engine was built in 1997.

Eidesvik Shipping offered to buy the design since Wärtsilä themselves had no interest in building it, but their offer was refused.

== Engines produced ==
The pre-war engines were Glow Head Engines in countless varieties. The first diesel engines were produced in 1938, when the company had 190 employees and an annual production of 160 engines. The engines earned a reputation for being easy to operate and maintain. An engineer once stated that Wichmann were built for morons, but built by geniuses.

The AX engine was reliable, but was ready to be replaced by the WX in the 1980s. Like their predecessor, the AC, both were two-stroke engines.

Wichmann launched the WX28 engine in 1984. This 2-stroke loop-scavenged trunk piston engine had cylinders with a 280 mm bore and 360 mm stoke. Each cylinder generated 295 kW and the engine was produced in 4, 5 and 6 in-line and V8, V10, V12 and V16 models, giving a choice of power from 1180 to 4735 kW.

The factory also produced controllable pitch propellers and gears. In the 1970s, they made their first electronic propeller control unit.

== Museum ==
Today, the factory which was building medium speed diesels is only doing maintenance, repair and upgrade on their motors, but propellers and gears are still built. It is today named Wärtsilä Norway.

On the site is a museum where you can see a variety of engine models including the first one built in 1903.
