= Tina Signesdottir Hult =

Norwegian photographer

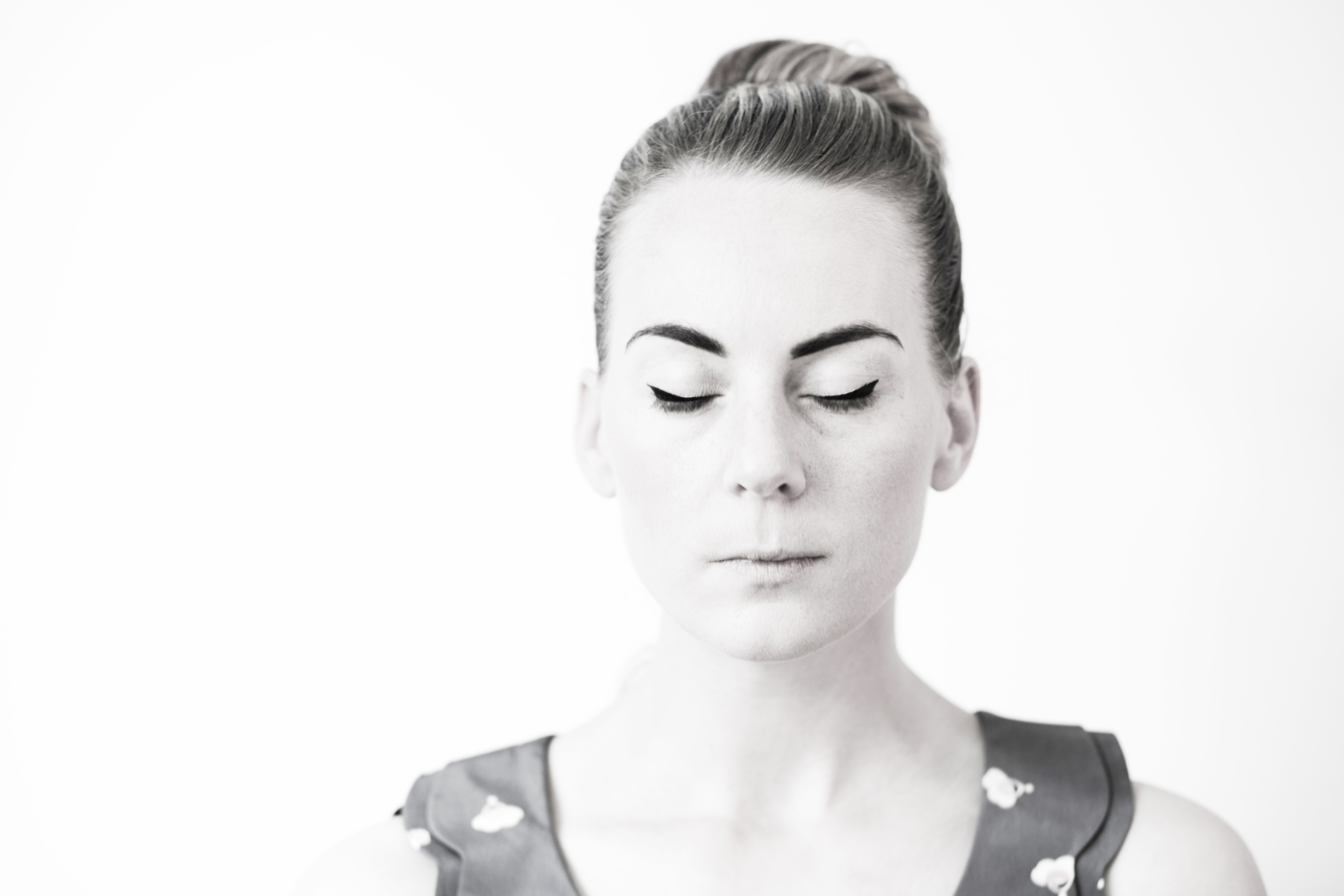
- Tina Signesdottir Hult self portrait
- Born: 1982 (age 43–44); Norway
- Known for: photography
- Movement: portraiture

Tina Signesdottir Hult is a Norwegian photographer.

== Biography ==
Tina Signesdottir Hult was born in Haugesund, Norway in 1982. She started to photograph early in the school. She is a self-taught photographer, specializing in portraiture photography. In January 2018, she was chosen as recipient of Hasselblad Masters Award in portrait category.

== Work ==
Hult specializes in fine art and portrait photography.

== Exhibitions ==
- 2017: Image Nation, DeFactory, Paris, France
- 2017: Image Nation, International Photo Expo, Galleria Civica, Desenzano del Garda, Italia
- 2016: Image Nation – DeFactory – Paris, France
- 2016: The Blind Pilots Project #2 – Thessaloniki, Greece
- 2015: Sony World Photography Awards Exhibition – Somerset House – London, England
- 2014: Solo Exhibition, Culture Night – Haugesund, Norway
- 2014: PhotoWorld Exhibition Festival, Breaking photography – New York, US
- 2014: Fotografiets dag – Preus Museum – Horten, Norway
- 2014: 8Th Emirates Edition (2013) “Decisive Moment” – Saadiyat Cultural District – Abu Dhabi, UAE
- 2014: Solo Exhibition (NsFF), Nordic Light, International Festival of Photography – Kristiansund, Norway
- 2014: Sony World Photography Awards Exhibition – Somerset House – London, England
- 2014: Group Exhibition – Cyan :studio – Oslo, Norway
- 2013: Group Exhibition – Cyan :studio – Oslo, Norway

== Awards ==
- 2015. Sony World Photography Awards. Winner in National Awards Category.
- 2018. Hasselblad Masters Award. Winner in Portrait category.
