= Henrik Bahr =

Norwegian judge

- Born: 3 October 1902; Christiania, Norway
- Died: 27 July 1982 (aged 79)
- Occupation: Judge
- Awards: Order of St. Olav; Order of the Polar Star

Henrik Eiler Støren Bahr (3 October 1902 – 27 July 1982) was a Norwegian judge.

== Biography ==
He was born in Christiania, a son of dentist Frithjof Bahr. He was appointed Justice of the Supreme Court of Norway from 1945. He was member of the Permanent Court of Arbitration in The Hague from 1957. He was decorated Commander of the Swedish Order of the Polar Star, and Commander of the Order of St. Olav. He died in July 1982 and was buried at Vestre gravlund.
