= Harald Rød =

Norwegian farmer and politician (1907–1982)

Personal details
- Born: Harald Andreas Rød; 29 July 1907 Frogn, Akershus, Norway
- Died: 14 August 1982 (aged 74–75) Frogn, Akershus, Norway
- Party: Centre Party

Harald Andreas Rød (29 July 1907 – 14 August 1982) was a Norwegian farmer and politician for the Centre Party.

He was born in Frogn as a son of farmers, and became a farmer at Huseby near Drøbak. In 1945 he became the first chairman of Norges Bygdeungdomslag. He also served as mayor of Frogn from 1946 to 1961. As such he was also a member of the county council.

He died in August 1982.

Preceded by position created	Chairman of Norges Bygdeungdomslag; 1946–	Succeeded by
