= Rúnar Vilhjálmsson =

Icelandic multi-sport athlete (1950-1970)

Personal information
- Date of birth: 19 January 1950
- Place of birth: Iceland
- Date of death: 1 February 1970 (aged 20)
- Place of death: London, England
- Position: Defender

Youth career
- –1969: Knattspyrnufélagið Fram

Senior career*
Years	Team	Apps	(Gls)
1969–1970	Knattspyrnufélagið Fram		

International career
1969	Iceland U19	3	(0)
1969–1970	Iceland		
- * Club domestic league appearances and goals

Rúnar Vilhjálmsson (19 January 1950 – 2 February 1970) was an Icelandic multi-sport athlete. Playing both handball and football, he was considered one of the country's top football prospects at the time of his death.

== Football career ==
Rúnar played for the Knattspyrnufélagið Fram youth teams where he was noted for his strength and passing ability. He starred for the Icelandic U19 team that finished second in the Nordic junior championship tournament. He started playing for the senior team of Fram in 1969 and his performance caught the eye of Ríkharður Jónsson, the manager of the Iceland national football team, who selected him to the squad in December 1969 for its game against Bermuda. In January 1970 he was again selected to the squad for its upcoming friendly against England's amateur team. On January 30, after the Icelandic team had arrived at the Windsor Hotel in Lancaster Gate, Rúnar stepped out on his rooms balcony to look at the view. Shortly after stepping out, the balcony floor gave out and Rúnar fell 10–12 meters to the street below. He was quickly transported to the Central Hospital in London where he underwent surgery for serious head injuries. He never regained consciousness and died on 2 February due to his injuries.
