= Tora Bakke Håndlykken =

Norwegian newspaper editor

- Born: 4 September 1982 (age 43); Porsgrunn, Norway
- Education: University of Oslo; Volda University College
- Occupation: Newspaper editor
- Employer: Verdens Gang

Tora Bakke Håndlykken (born 4 September 1982) is a Norwegian journalist and newspaper editor. Since 2017 she has been news editor of the newspaper Verdens Gang.

== Personal life and education ==
Born in Porsgrunn on 4 September 1982, Håndlykken studied geography at the University of Oslo and journalism at Volda University College.

== Career ==
Håndlykken was a journalist for the newspaper Varden from 2004, for NRK in 2005, and for the newspaper Verdens Gang from 2005. In VG she had various positions, and was appointed news editor in 2017.

She was named Editor of the year in 2023 by Oslo Redaktørforening (the Oslo Association of Editors).

From 2023 she chairs the board of the Association of Norwegian Editors.
