= Ann-Kristin Engstad =

Norwegian politician (born 1982)

Ann-Kristin Engstad (born 5 April 1982) is a Norwegian politician for the Labour Party.

She served as a deputy representative to the Norwegian Parliament from Finnmark during the term 2005–2009.

On the local level, she has been a member of the municipal council of Hammerfest Municipality and the Finnmark county council.
