= Ivar Cederholm =

Norwegian tenor

- Born: June 22, 1902; Oslo, Norway
- Died: October 19, 1982 (aged 80)
- Occupation: Singer

Sven Ivar Cederholm (June 22, 1902 – October 19, 1982) was a Norwegian tenor.

Cederholm was born in Oslo, the son of Sven and Alvhild (Alfhild) Cederholm (née Knoff). He debuted in 1936 in Gothenburg and performed in operetta roles in Scandinavia and London, including as Rosillon in The Merry Widow, the count in Der Graf von Luxemburg, Paris in La belle Hélène, and Prince Radjami in Die Bajadere. He also sang with the Norwegian Radio Orchestra. He appeared as a singer in the 1942 film Det æ'kke te å tru. Cederholm also taught music at the school in Oslo's Marienlyst neighborhood. He died in 1982 and is buried in Oslo's West Cemetery.

== Filmography ==
- 1942: Det æ'kke te å tru
