= Dagfin (given name) =

Dagfin is a given name. Notable people with the given name include:

- Dagfin Huseby (1922–2010), Norwegian wrestler
- Dagfin Juel (1909–1985), Norwegian civil servant and politician
- Dagfin Werenskiold (1892–1977), Norwegian sculptor and painter
