= Leif O. Foss =

Norwegian politician

Leif Olav Foss (28 August 1899 – 1982) was a Norwegian trade unionist and politician for the Communist Party.

He spent his early working career at sea, and from 1919 as a docks worker at Akers Mekaniske Verksted. He was organized, first through the Norsk matros- og fyrbøterunion, then through the Union of Iron and Metalworkers, chairing the sub-union Dokkarbeidernes forening from 1922 to 1925. He was a supervisory council member in Oslo faglige samorg from 1923 to 1930, and a national board member of the Union of Iron and Metalworkers from 1925 to 1929.

He joined the Norwegian Labour Party in 1920, and then the Communist Party. He became party secretary for trade affairs, and was a delegate at the Red International of Labour Unions Congress in 1930. Here he was elected to the RILU executive committee, and moved to Moscow. He returned to Norway after a few years.

During the occupation of Norway by Nazi Germany, he was arrested two times for resistance. The first time he was imprisoned in Møllergata 19 from 15 August to 2 September 1940. On 12 September 1941 he was arrested for the second time, after the milk strike. He was incarcerated in Grini concentration camp until 3 April 1942, when he was sent to Sachsenhausen concentration camp. He was sent further to many camps, first Lichterfelde, then Hamburg-Fuhlsbüttel, Neuengamme, Hamburg-Fühlsbuttel again, Königswartha, Bautzen, Leipzig and Eisenach. He was freed at the war's end. After the war, from 1945 to 1949 he was the secretary in the Union of Iron and Metalworkers.
