= Odd Harald Johansen =

Norwegian politician (born 1982)

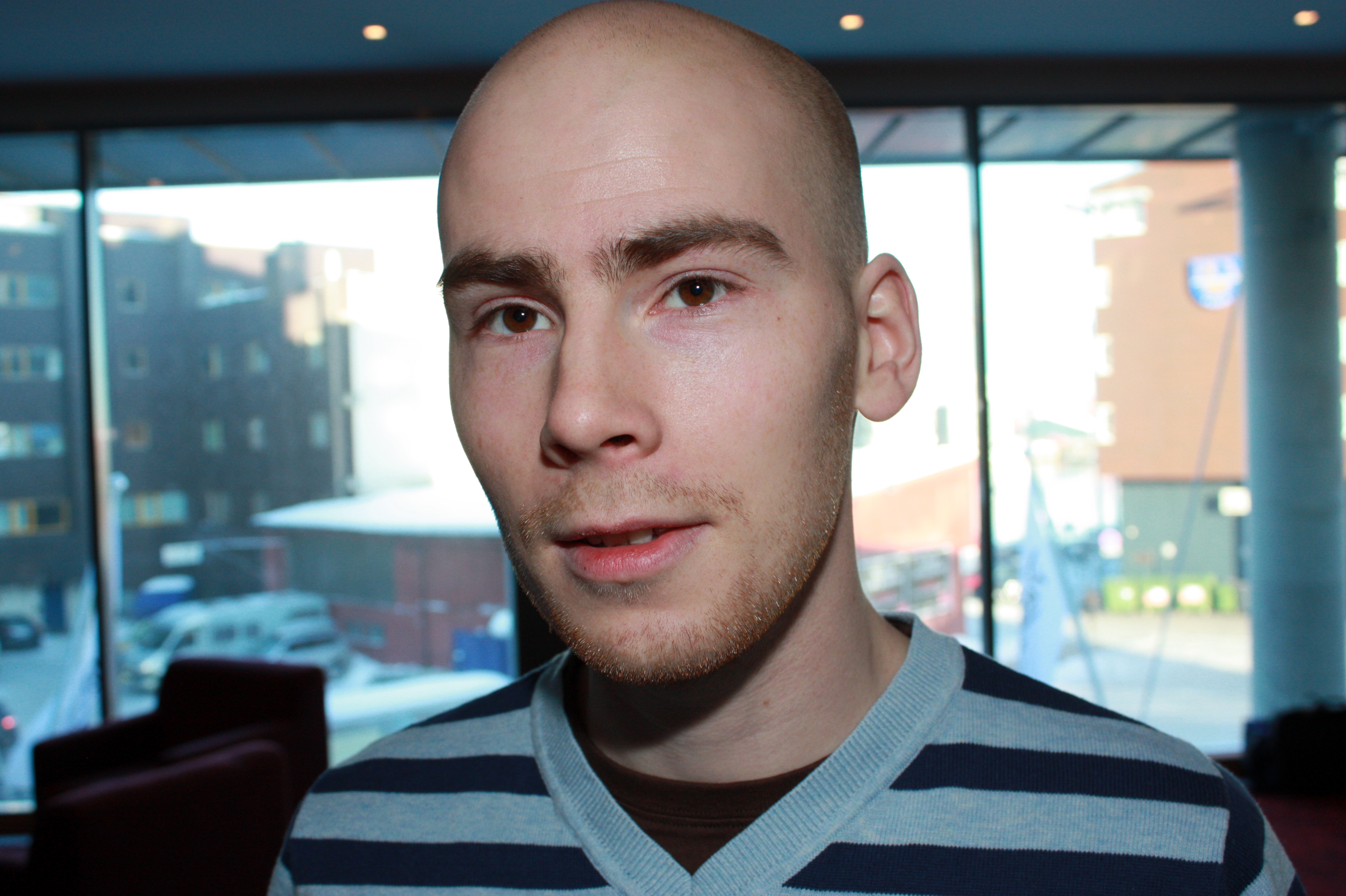
Odd Harald Johansen

Odd Harald Johansen (born 18 August 1982) is a Norwegian politician for the Labour Party.

He served as a deputy representative to the Norwegian Parliament from Troms during the term 2005–2009.

On the local level he is a deputy member of the municipal council of Karlsøy Municipality.
