= Lars Nordberg =

Norwegian handball player (born 1982)

Lars Nordberg (born 23 April 1982) is a Norwegian handball player. He has played handball in the highest Norwegian league, and also had a brief football career as a goalkeeper.

== Career ==
He hails from Elverum Municipality, where he started out as a handball player. As a teenager he tried out as a football goalkeeper by coincidence, and started playing for Elverum Fotball. He was on trial in Rosenborg BK, but joined Hamarkameratene ahead of the 2002 season. He played one match in the 1. divisjon against Lørenskog and one cup game, but his career was marred by injuries. He was loaned out to Elverum Fotball in 2003, and never returned to Hamarkameratene.

Instead, he returned to handball and joined Elverum Håndball in the highest Norwegian league. He is a back player, and stands 1.96 m (6 ft 5 in) tall.

After twelve seasons with Elverum Håndball, Nordberg was not offered a new contract with the club and joined the second-tier team Kolstad Håndball.
