= Mato Grubisic =

Norwegian footballer (born 1982)

Personal information
- Date of birth: 25 June 1982 (age 44)
- Height: 1.88 m (6 ft 2 in)
- Position: Striker

Team information
- Current team: Valdres

Senior career*
Years	Team	Apps	(Gls)
–2003	Skjetten		
2004–2005	Lillestrøm	4	(0)
2005	→ Ull/Kisa (loan)		
2006	Ull/Kisa		
2007–2008	Skjetten		
2009–present	Valdres		
- * Club domestic league appearances and goals

Mato Grubisic (born 25 June 1982) is a Norwegian football striker who plays for Valdres FK.

== Career ==
In the Norwegian Second Division season of 2003, Grubisic scored 19 goals for his club Skjetten SK. He received transfer offers from Kongsvinger IL and Pors Grenland, but opted to stay in Skjetten. However, he trained with Lillestrøm SK during the winter. Already a few months later he signed for Lillestrøm. He got three Norwegian Premier League games in 2004, and one in 2005, but without scoring. In the second half of 2005 he was loaned out to Ullensaker/Kisa IL. After the season the loan was made permanent.

Ahead of the 2007 season he returned to Skjetten SK, moving from the third to the fourth tier of Norwegian football. He was offered a job in addition to a part-time football contract. Skjetten cruised through the season, and was promoted with ease, winning the playoff matches against Grüner IL 14–0 on aggregate. Grubisic scored 45 league goals during the 2007 season. In the Norwegian Second Division 2008 he scored 20 goals as Skjetten retained its place in the league. Ahead of the 2009 season, however, he signed for Valdres FK, citing that he needed a "change of environment".
