= Mah-Rukh Ali =

Norwegian journalist and news anchor (born 1982)

- Born: 1 January 1982 (age 44); Oslo, Norway
- Education: BA (Lahore), Journalism (Volda University College)
- Occupations: Journalist, News Anchor
- Years active: 2003–present
- Known for: News anchor at NRK, TV2
- Notable work: Den sure virkeligheten (1996) *Trusselen fra IS (2015)
- Spouse: Divorced
- Children: 1

Mah-Rukh Ali (Urdu: ماہ رخ علی, born 1 January 1982) is a Norwegian journalist and news anchor.

Mah-Rukh Ali was born and raised in Oslo, of Pakistani parents, with three brothers. As a 14-year-old, she wrote the book Den sure virkeligheten (lit. "The Sour Reality"), released in 1996. The book elaborates on growing up in the west end of Oslo, Norway as a Muslim girl and about feeling Norwegian but being treated differently. She received several racist letters and threats in reaction to the book. She was invited to write a column in Klassekampen after that. She then took a BA degree in Lahore from 2000 to 2002, and studied journalism at Volda University College from 2002 to 2004.

Ali started her career in the NRK radio news in 2003, and later came to work as a reporter for Dagsrevyen, NRK's main news broadcast, in autumn 2005. She was sent as a reporter for the NRK to the earthquake-struck areas of Pakistan during autumn 2005. She has also worked for the daily newspapers Aftenposten and Dagbladet.

Of Pakistani ancestry, in 2006 she became the first news presenter of foreign heritage in a nationwide news broadcast for the Norwegian Broadcasting Corporation (NRK). During autumn 2006 she was employed by TV 2, and on 15 January 2007 she co-hosted the first regular broadcast of TV 2 Nyhetskanalen alongside Terje Svabø. In 2010, she became a news anchor for the main station TV2; being 28 years old, she was the station's youngest news anchor.

In October 2015, she published the book Trusselen fra IS (The threat from IS).

== Personal life ==
Mah-Rukh Ali is divorced and has a daughter.
