= Pål Rustadstuen =

Norwegian footballer (born 1982)

Personal information
- Date of birth: October 1, 1982 (age 44)
- Place of birth: Lillehammer, Norway
- Position: Midfielder

College career
Years	Team	Apps	(Gls)
- NTG-Bærum

Senior career*
Years	Team	Apps	(Gls)
2003—2004	Lyn		
2004—2006	→ Oslo/M/S (loan)		
2006—2008	Sarpsborg		
2008—2009	Sarpsborg 08		
2013—2014	Greåker IF		
2017—2018	Tune Menn 1		
- * Club domestic league appearances and goals

Pål Rustadstuen (born 1 October 1982) is a Norwegian football midfielder who has been inactive since 2017.

== Early life ==
Rustadstuen was born in Lillehammer, Norway on 1 October 1982. He attended Norges Toppidrettsgymnas (NTG), a secondary school focused on sports.

== Career ==
Rustadstuen played 12 matches with Lyn, his first professional club, during the 2003—2004 season and competed with them for the UEFA Cup Winners' Cup. He was loaned to Oslo Øst in early 2004 and ultimately left Lyn due to an injury. He was captain of Oslo Øst/M/S during the 2004-2005 season. He spent much of the season injured. In 2005, he signed a two-year contract with Sarpsborg and debuted in 2006. He left the team in 2009 after playing for three season. During the 2013—2014 season, he played for Greåker. He played one season for Tune Menn 1 in 2017—2018.
