= Ole Talberg =

Norwegian footballer (born 1982)

Personal information
- Full name: Ole Gjendemsjø Talberg
- Date of birth: 22 July 1982 (age 44)
- Place of birth: Tromsø, Norway
- Height: 1.82 m (6 ft 0 in)
- Position: Defender

Senior career*
Years	Team	Apps	(Gls)
2000–2005	Tromsø	33	(1)
2002	→ FF Jaro (loan)	10	(0)
2005	→ Alta (loan)	10	(2)
2006–2014	Tromsdalen	216	(14)
- * Club domestic league appearances and goals as of 24 December 2014

Ole Gjendemsjø Talberg (born 22 July 1982) is a Norwegian football defender who currently plays for Tromsdalen UIL.

He made his first-team debut for Tromsø IL in 2000, and was in the starting eleven for the first time against Rosenborg BK in September. He played in several Norwegian Premier League games in 2000, 2001, 2003 and 2004. He also played for the Norwegian under-21 national team.

He was loaned out to FF Jaro in 2002, and to Alta IF in 2005. He permanently joined Tromsdalen UIL ahead of the 2006 season.

== Career statistics ==
Season	Club	Division	League		Cup		Europe		Total	
Season	Club	Division	Apps	Goals	Apps	Goals	Apps	Goals	Apps	Goals
Tromsø	2000	Tippeligaen	5	0	0	0	–		5	0
Tromsø	2001	Tippeligaen	7	0	2	1	–		9	1
Tromsø	2002	1. divisjon	7	1	1	0	–		8	1
Tromsø	2003	Tippeligaen	8	0	4	0	–		12	0
Tromsø	2004	Tippeligaen	6	0	2	0	–		8	0
Tromsø	2005	Tippeligaen	0	0	0	0	0	0	0	0
Tromsø	Total		33	1	9	1	0	0	42	2
Jaro (loan)	2002	Veikkausliiga	10	0	0	0	–		10	0
Alta (loan)	2005	1. divisjon	10	2	1	1	–		11	3
Tromsdalen	2006	1. divisjon	27	5	0	0	–		27	5
Tromsdalen	2007	1. divisjon	26	3	1	0	–		27	3
Tromsdalen	2008	2. divisjon	26	0	0	0	–		26	0
Tromsdalen	2009	1. divisjon	23	2	0	0	–		23	2
Tromsdalen	2010	1. divisjon	25	1	3	0	–		28	1
Tromsdalen	2011	2. divisjon	26	1	0	0	–		26	1
Tromsdalen	2012	1. divisjon	27	2	2	0	–		29	2
Tromsdalen	2013	2. divisjon	21	0	2	0	–		23	0
Tromsdalen	2014	1. divisjon	15	0	2	0	–		17	0
Tromsdalen	Total		216	14	10	0	0	0	226	14
Career Total			269	17	20	2	0	0	289	19
