= Tommy Runar =

Norwegian footballer (born 1982)

Personal information
- Date of birth: 25 April 1982 (age 44)
- Place of birth: Grimstad Municipality, Norway
- Height: 1.84 m (6 ft 1/2 in)
- Position: Goalkeeper

Senior career*
Years	Team	Apps	(Gls)
2002	Jerv		
2003–2009	IK Start	6	(0)
2008	→ Fredrikstad (loan)	7	(0)
2010–2012	Jerv	42	(1)
- * Club domestic league appearances and goals as of 2012-07-29

Tommy Runar (born 25 April 1982) is a retired Norwegian football goalkeeper. Runar played for Jerv, joining Start in 2004. He spent the majority of the 2008 season on loan at Fredrikstad, serving as cover for Lasse Staw.

He retired after the 2012 season, and has since worked as goalkeeping coach for FK Jerv and Amazon Grimstad.

== Career statistics ==
Club	Season	League		Cup	
Club	Season	Apps	Goals	Apps	Goals
Start	2004	1	0	0	0
Start	2005	0	0	0	0
Start	2006	2	0	0	0
Start	2007	2	0	3	0
Start	2008	0	0	0	0
FFK	2008	7	0	4	0
Start	2009	1	0	1	0
Career total		12	0	8	0

== Honours ==
=== Club ===
Fredrikstad

- Tippeligaen:
  - Runner-up (1): 2008

== Personal life ==
He is member of an Humanity Organisation Start Life Support and founded in Mbale, Uganda, a football camp, along with Kaspar Strømme.
