= Runar Jørstad =

Norwegian journalist

Runar Jørstad (born 1982) is a Norwegian journalist for NRK Dagsrevyen. He produced a controversial news story about Romani people aired on channel NRK on January 12, 2013. This piece was considered by the Norwegian Press Complaints Commission as "violating press ethical standards". Jørstad is a board member of the Skup Foundation, a foundation for promoting investigative journalism.
