= Fiskaa Verk =

Norwegian metallurgical plant in Kristiansand

- Company type: Industrial plant
- Industry: Metallurgy
- Founded: 1917
- Headquarters: Kristiansand, Norway
- Products: Ferroalloys, carbon electrodes, silicon
- Owner: Elkem

Fiskaa Verk is an industrial plant in Kristiansand, Norway, established in 1917 when Elkem took over operations from Kristiansand Elektrokemiske A/S. Activity on the site had begun in 1907 under the German company BASF, producing artificial fertilizer, but when Elkem took over it ended fertilizer production and concentrated on the electric smelting of various materials. The plant was the site of important research: the Søderberg electrode, a self-baking continuous electrode that significantly increased capacity in the smelting industry, was first demonstrated at Fiskaa Verk in 1919.

In its later history the plant produced ferroalloys, and Elkem developed a bag filter there that greatly reduced emissions from smelting works around the world. From 2009 the site also produced high-purity silicon for solar cells, though that operation, by then part of REC Solar Norway, was closed in 2023 amid high energy prices and global overproduction. Elkem's other operations at Fiskaa continue, including Elkem Carbon, the "old" Fiskaa Verk, which produces carbon electrodes.
