= Aleksander Nordaas =

Norwegian screenwriter and film director

Aleksander L. Nordaas
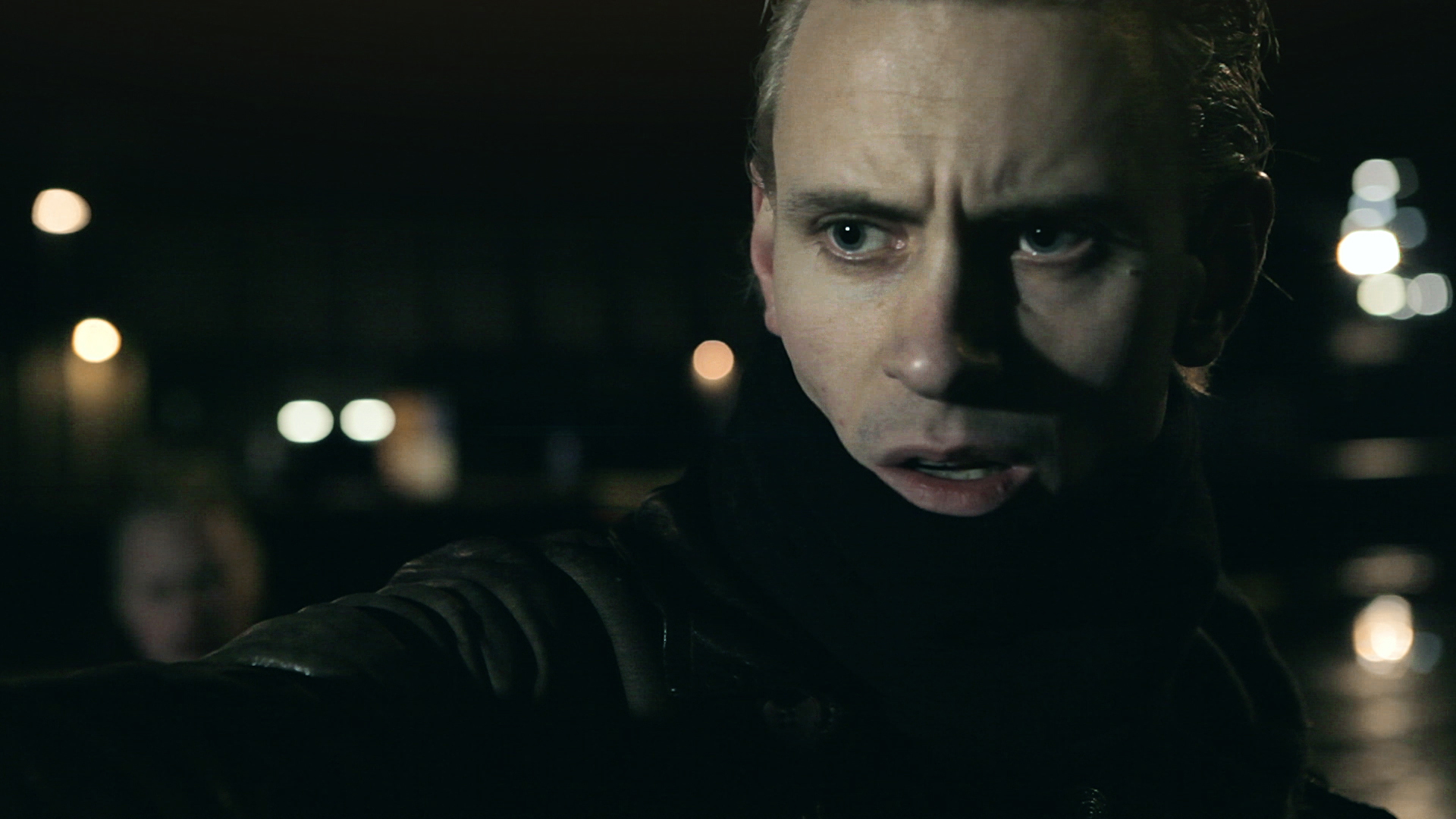
- Aleksander L. Nordaas in the "Made in Mosjøen" webseries
- Born: Aleksander Leines Nordaas; 21 November 1982 (age 43); Mosjøen, Norway
- Occupations: Film director, screenwriter

Aleksander Leines Nordaas (born 21 November 1982, in Mosjøen) is a Norwegian screenwriter and film director, and is a co-owner of the Norwegian production company Yesbox Productions. Nordaas is also a published author and an exhibited photographer and digital artist.

== Films ==
- 2005: Sirkel (feature film – scriptwriter, director, DOP, editor). Norway's first no-budget feature. Won the Audience Award at Bergen internasjonale filmfestival in 2005.
- 2007: Takk skal du ha (webseries – director, co-script, DOP, editor)
- 2008: In Chambers (short film – scriptwriter, director, editor). Awarded "Best Short Film" at WT Os internasjonale filmfestival 2008. and Best Norwegian and Beste Nordic short film at Minimalen in 2009. The full-length short film is available online.
- 2012: Thale (feature film – scriptwriter, director, DOP, editor, set designer). Reviewed by Empire as "Beautifully enigmatic and eerie" and Ain't It Cool News as "A truly unique and amazing film." Thale was sold to 50+ countries and screened at a numerous festivals, including Toronto International Film Festival. Thale won the Audience Award at Fantasporto, Best Film at Méliès d'Argent / Espoo Ciné and Best Script at International Film Awards Berlin.
- 2012: Mister Mushy (animated short film – scriptwriter, director, editor). Sold to the Norwegian Broadcasting Corporation.
- 2012: Kind of Fishy (animated short film/aquarium – concept, director) Kind of Fishy won the FineArt's Award for Best Exhibit at Galleria Art Festival 2012.
- 2013: Mushroom Monster (animated short film – scriptwriter, director, editor) Screened at a numerous children film's festival, including Cinekid and TIFF Kids. International sales agent: SND Films.
- 2014: The Strolltroll (animated short film – scriptwriter, director, editor) Sold to the Norwegian Broadcasting Corporation. The short film wrapped up the NRK Christmas Morning Special in 2016.
- 2015: Made in Mosjøen (webseries – producer, scriptwriter, director, editor, sound designer, set designer). 8 award wins. Nominated for The Webby Awards, The Streamy Awards and The Lovie Awards – as well 32 other nominations. Screened at 26 festival. Covered by e.g. Empire, ScreenDaily and Rue Morgue. Reviews: Empire: "A bizarre, Lynchian webseries". Ain't It Cool News: "Simply brilliant.". NRK P1: "Norway's Twin Peaks". Dirge Magazine: "So unique and genuinely funny."
- 2016: The Dog (short film – co-scriptwriter, co-director, editor). Screened at Fantastic Fest, TIFF, Grimstad. (April 2017: currently touring festivals)
- 2017: Baahdy & Birdy (animated short film – scriptwriter, director). Premiered at Verdens Beste in Tromsø. (April 2017: currently touring festivals).

== Published books and apps ==
- 2009: Kadaver (novel) (Novel)
- 2012: Kind of Fishy (app) App made by driftwood. Reviews: 148apps: "Incredibly unique and pretty awesome to look at." Fun Educational Apps: "This app is simply beautiful. I can honestly say that I've never reviewed anything like Kind of Fishy"" – *TOP PICK*
- 2016: The Strolltroll (Children's book) 1. print self-published after a successful crowdfunding-kampanje. The book was chosen as a Project We Love and Project of the Day. Also published in Norwegian (Rallskanken)
- 2017: Mister Mushy (Children's book and app) 1. print self-published after a successful crowdfunding-campaign. The book was chosen as a Project We Love by Kickstarter. Also published in Norwegian (Mister Mjukis).

== Photography and Digital Art ==
- Showcase
- Awards: Best Exhibition (Kind of Fishy), Galleria Art Festival 2012.

== Representation (film) ==
- Circle of Confusion
