= Inger Haldorsen =

Norwegian physician, midwife and politician

Inger Alida Haldorsen
- Born: 15 December 1895; Bømlo, Norway
- Died: 3 January 1982 (aged 86)
- Education: University of Oslo (M.D.)
- Scientific career
- Fields: Medicine
- Workplaces: State School for Midwives

Inger Haldorsen (15 December 1899 – 3 January 1982) was a Norwegian physician, midwife and politician for the Liberal Party.

== Life ==
Inger Alida Haldorsen was born on Bømlo, Norway on 19 May 1899 and received her M.D. degree from the University of Oslo. She became interested in gynecology and worked for the State School for Midwives. Haldorsen joined the Norwegian Medical Women's Association in 1934 and became its secretary. She attended an international course in Paris, France, in 1937–38 and worked as a senior registrar when she returned to Bergen, Norway. In response to the German occupation of Norway in 1940, Haldorsen joined the Resistance Movement. Interrogated by the Gestapo, she was jailed, but was released before the end of the war. She had started a private practice in 1943, but she found it difficult to restart after the war. Haldorsen became politically active and held several municipal offices before fielding for election to the Storting. She served as a deputy representative for the constituency Bergen during the terms 1958–1961, 1961–1965 and 1965–1969. In total she met during 84 days of parliamentary session.

Haldorsen was medical superintendent of a children's home and advisor to a hospital board from 1959 to about 1964. She was also president of the Norwegian Midwives' Association for six years. She died in 1982.
