= Dagfinn Dekke =

Norwegian jurist and civil servant

Dagfinn Dekke (1908–1982) was a Norwegian jurist and civil servant.

He graduated with the cand.jur. degree in 1932, and worked as a deputy judge from 1934 to 1937. In 1937 he was hired in the Ministry of Finance, advancing to assistant secretary. From 1947 to 1949 he was the director of Registreringsdirektoratet. He was then deputy under-secretary of state in the Ministry of Finance from 1949 to 1960, before serving as district stipendiary magistrate in Ytre Follo from 1960 to 1978.
