= Dagfinn Mannsåker =

Norwegian historian

Dagfinn Mannsåker (30 June 1916 – 16 July 1994) was a Norwegian archivist and historian.

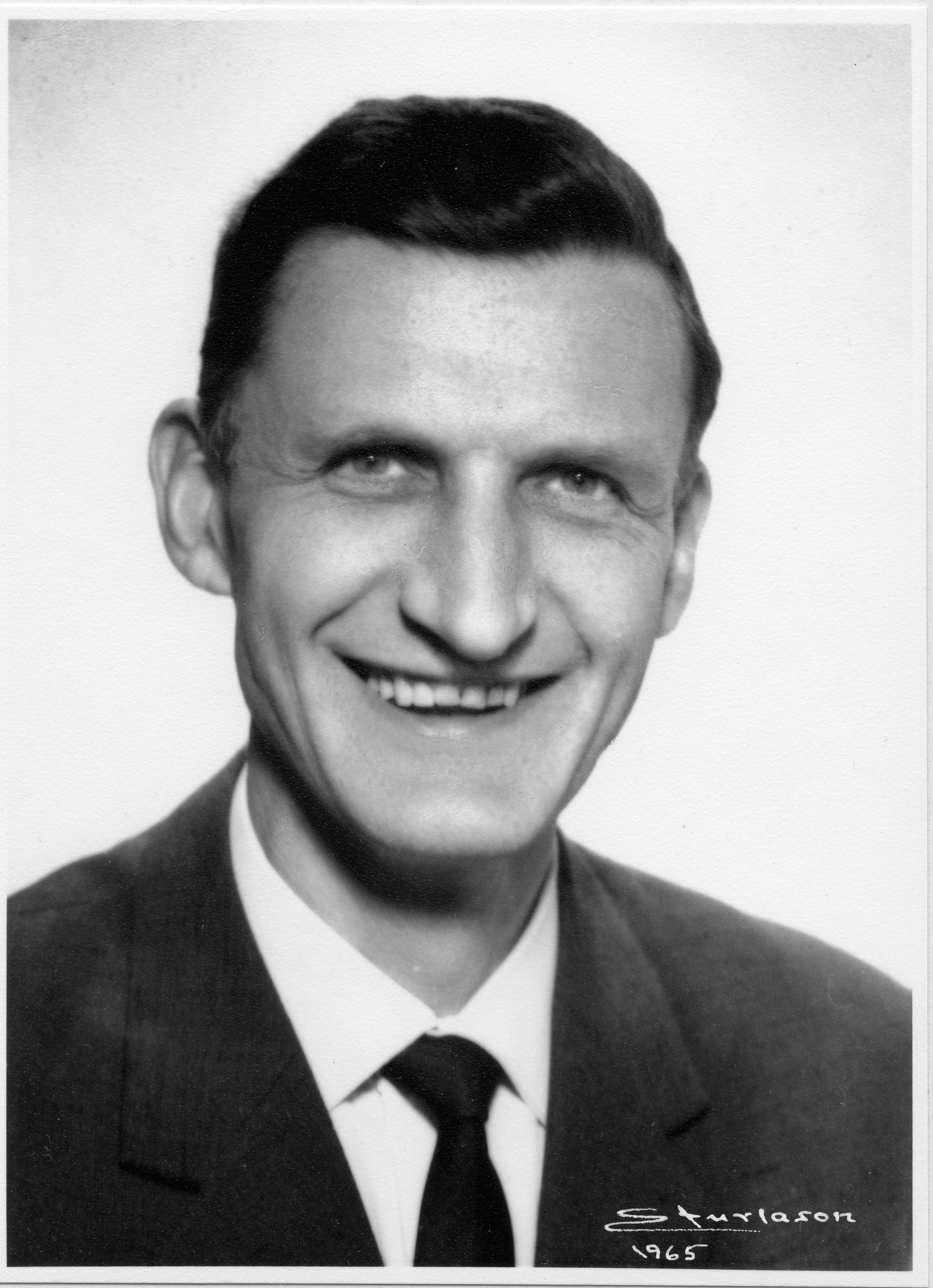
Dagfinn Mannsåker

He was born in Ullensvang Municipality in Hordaland county, Norway. He was the brother of Bergfrid Fjose. He took the dr.philos. degree in 1955, on the thesis Det norske presteskapet i det nittande hundreåret. Sosialhistoriske studiar. He worked as a school teacher from 1954 to 1959, lecturer at the University of Oslo from 1959 to 1965 and national archivist from 1965 to 1982. He edited the academic journal Historisk Tidsskrift for many years, and contributed to Norsk Biografisk Leksikon. From 1966 to 1972 he chaired the Norwegian Historical Association (Den norske historiske forening).

== Publications (selected) ==
- Jacob Aall: liv og gjerning før 1814, Oslo 1944.
- Det norske presteskapet i det nittande hundreåret. Sosialhistoriske studiar, 1954.
- Norsk samfunnslære, with Hans Aarnes, 1956.
- Norsk samfunnslære for realskolen/realskulen, with Hans Aarnes, 1959.
- Nyare forsking omkring 1814, in the booklet 1814 og 1884, Oslo 1968.
- Diskresjonsspørsmål og personvern i lokalhistoria, in Heimen, 1977
- Dei religiøse folkerørslene og samfunnet ca. 1750 - 1850, in Streiftog i Kirkehistorien, Oslo 1996.
- Vegen til Kringsjå. Byggesaka til Riksarkivet fram til 1965, in Arkivmagasinet 1/1998
