= Osborne (name) =

Osborne /ˈɒzbɔːrn/, along with Osbourne, Osbern, Osborn and Usborne, is an English name cognate with, and possibly influenced by the Old Norse Ásbjørn. The English Os (see Ós) and the Norse Ás (see Aesir) mean God, while bjørn means bear in Norse.

== People with the surname Osborne ==
- Aaron Osborne (1947–1995), American modern dancer and teacher
- Adam Osborne (1939–2003), computer pioneer
- Alexandra Osborne (born 1995), Australian tennis player
- Anders Osborne (born 1966), American singer-songwriter
- Barrie M. Osborne, (born 1944), American film producer
- Bertín Osborne (born 1953), Spanish singer
- Bertrand Osborne (1935–2018), Chief Minister of Montserrat
- Betty Osborne (1952–1971), Canadian murder victim
- Bill Osborne (born 1955), New Zealand rugby union player
- Bill Osborne (racing driver) (1946–2009), American racing driver
- Bobby Osborne (1931–2023), American musician, half of the Osborne Brothers, along with his brother Sonny
- Buzz Osborne (born 1964), American musician
- Lady Camilla Osborne (born 1950), English heiress
- Charisma Osborne (born 2001), American basketball player
- Charles Osborne (disambiguation), several people

- Charles Osborne (politician), MP (1759–1817), Irish politician and judge
- Sir Charles Osborne, 14th Baronet (1825–1879), Irish baronet of the Osborne baronets
- Charles Osborne (American football) (c. 1885 – after 1907), American football player and coach
- Charles Nelson Osborne, better known as Uncle Charlie Osborne (1890–1992), American folk musician
- Charles Osborne (farmer) (1893/1894–1991), American farmer who suffered from hiccups for 68 years
- Charles Osborne (music writer) (1927–2017), Australian-born writer on classical music and of Agatha Christie adaptations

- Uncle Charlie Osborne (1890–1992), American musician
- Chuck Osborne (1939–1979), American professional basketball player
- Chuck Osborne (American football) (1973–2012), American football player
- Colin Osborne (born 1975), English darts player
- Curtis Osborne (1970–2008), American convicted murderer
- Darren Osborne (born 1969), perpetrator of the 2017 Finsbury Park van attack
- Daphne Osborne (1930–2006), British plant scientist
- Deirdre Osborne, Australian-born academic
- Dennis H. Osborne, (1919–2016), British painter
- Dorothy Osborne (1627–1695), English writer
- Duffield Osborne (1858–1917), American author and ornithologist
- Ernest Osborne (cricketer) (1873–1926), Australian cricketer
- Ernest Osborne (footballer) (1899–1954), English footballer
- Francis Osborne, 5th Duke of Leeds (1751–1799), British politician
- F. Edward Osborne, American politician
- Fred Osborne (1865–1907), Canadian baseball player
- Gary Osborne, British singer and songwriter
- George Osborne, 6th Duke of Leeds (1775–1831), British nobility
- George Osborne (born 1971), British politician and former Chancellor of the Exchequer
- Helen Betty Osborne (1952–1971), Canadian murder victim
- Hewett Osborne (1567–1599), English soldier
- James Osborne (VC) (1857–1928), English First Boer War hero
- Jeffrey Osborne (born 1948), American singer
- Jim Osborne (defensive tackle), American football player
- Jim Osborne (tennis), tennis player
- Joan Osborne (born 1962), American musician
- John Osborne (1929–1994), English playwright
- John Osborne (Montserrat politician), (1936–2011), Montserrat politician
- John Eugene Osborne (1858–1943), American politician
- John Michael "Ozzy" Osbourne, English singer, songwriter, actor, and television personality (1948-2025)
- John Walter Osborne (1828–1902), Irish photo-lithography pioneer
- Kate Osborne, British Labour MP
- Kayle Osborne (born 2002), Canadian ice hockey player
- Malik Osborne (born 1998), American basketball player
- Mark Osborne (disambiguation), several people

- Mark Osborne (cricketer) (born 1961), Australian cricketer
- Mark Osborne (ice hockey) (born 1961), Canadian ice hockey player
- Mark Osborne (filmmaker) (born 1970), American film director

- Mary Pope Osborne, American author
- Matt Osborne (1957–2013), American professional wrestler
- Mike Osborne (1941–2007), English jazz musician
- Milton Osborne, Australian historian
- Nigel Osborne (born 1948), British composer
- Paul Osborne, Australian rugby league footballer and politician
- Ralph Bernal Osborne (1808–1882), British politician
- Richard Osborne (born 1964), Australian rules footballer
- Robert Osborne (1932–2017), American actor and film historian
- Robert M. Osborne (1852–1931), newspaper proprietor and editor in South Australia, Tasmanian mayor, brother of Samuel
- Robin Osborne (born 1957), historian of antiquity
- Samuel W. Osborne (1868–1952), newspaper proprietor and editor in South Australia, brother of Robert
- Sandra Osborne (born 1956), Scottish politician
- Sarah Osborne (c. 1643–1692), American colonist
- Sonny Osborne (1937–2021), American bluegrass singer and banjo player, half of the Osborne Brothers duo, with his brother Bobby
- Stephen Osborne (writer) (born 1947), Canadian writer
- Steve Osborne, music producer
- Steven Osborne (pianist), (born 1971), Scottish pianist
- Ted Osborne (1900 or 1901–1968), comic artist
- Thomas Osborne (disambiguation), several people
  - Thomas Osborne, 1st Duke of Leeds (1631–1712), English statesman
  - Thomas Mott Osborne (1859–1926), American prison reformer
  - Thomas W. Osborn (1833–1898), American soldier and politician
  - Tom Osborne (born 1937), American politician and football coach
- R. Travis Osborne (1913–2013), American psychologist
- Virgle Osborne, American politician
- Walter Osborne (1859–1903), Irish impressionist landscape and portrait painter
- Weedon Osborne (1892–1918), American military officer
- Will Osborne (rugby) (1875–1942), Wales international rugby player
- Will Osborne (singer) (1905–1981), Canadian singer
- William Osborne (disambiguation), several people

- Qwominer William Osborne, British Virgin Islands politician
- William Osborne (umpire), National League umpire in 1876
- William H. Osborne (born 1960), former president and CEO of Federal Signal Corporation
- William Osborn (Medal of Honor) (1837–1887), American soldier and Medal of Honor recipient
- William A. Osborn (born 1947), American bank executive
- William Church Osborn (1862–1951), New York State Democratic Committee Chairman, 1914–1916
- William G. Osborne, respondent in District Attorney's Office v. Osborne, a U.S. Supreme Court case
- William H. Osborn (1821–1894), American railroad tycoon
- Sir William Osborne, 8th Baronet (died 1783), Irish baronet and politician

- Willson Osborne (1906–1979), American composer
- Winton B. Osborne (died 1998), American politician
- M.R. Osborne English writer

== People with the given name Osborne ==
- Osborne Reynolds, innovator in the understanding of fluid dynamics
- Osbeorn Bulax, Anglo-Saxon warrior
- Osbern the Steward, steward to two Dukes of Normandy
- Osbern FitzOsbern, Anglo-Norman Bishop of Exeter
- Osborne I. Yellott (1871–1922), American politician
- Osborne Smith (born 1954), better known as Ozzie Smith, American baseball player
- Osborne Bingham, birth name of American record producer Dinky Bingham

== People with the middle name Osborne ==
- Andrew Osborne Hayfield (1905–1981), American businessman and politician

== Fictional characters ==
- Osborne Hamley, from the Elizabeth Gaskell novel Wives and Daughters
- Darren Osborne, from the British soap opera Hollyoaks
- Jeremy Osborne, from the British sitcom Peep Show
- Super Dave Osborne, a character created by American comedian Bob Einstein
- Reverend Osborne Whitworth, supporting character in the third and fourth seasons of Poldark

== See also ==
- Ansgar (name)
- Ausburn, a surname and given name
- Asbjørn
- Osborn (disambiguation)
- Osborn (surname)
- Osborne (disambiguation)
- Osbourne (disambiguation)
- Usborne (disambiguation)
- Osred
