= Espen =

Espen is a Norwegian masculine given name. In Norway it reached the peak of its popularity between 1970 and 1990, during which period approximately 1.1% of children were given that name.

== Origin and variants ==
It originated as a variant of Asbjørn or Esben.

== Given name ==
Notable people with the given name include:

=== Artists ===
- Espen Aalberg, Norwegian jazz musician, drummer
- Espen Berg (musician) (born 1983), Norwegian musician, arranger and composer
- Espen Dietrichson (born 1976), Norwegian artist
- Espen Eckbo (born 1973), Norwegian actor, writer and comedian
- Espen Sommer Eide (born 1972), Norwegian composer and musician
- Espen Eriksen, Norwegian jazz musician founder of Espen Eriksen Trio
- Espen Grjotheim (born 1976), Norwegian singer and actor
- Espen Haavardsholm (born 1945), Norwegian novelist, poet, biographer and essayist
- Espen Klouman Høiner (born 1981), Norwegian writer and actor
- Espen Beranek Holm (born 1960), Norwegian pop artist and comedian
- Espen Lervaag (born 1977), Norwegian writer, comedian and actor
- Espen Lind (born 1971), Norwegian record producer, songwriter, singer, and multi-instrumentalist
- Espen Rud (born 1948), Norwegian jazz musician, drummer, composer, and music arranger
- Espen Salberg (born 1952), Norwegian ballroom dancer
- Espen Sandberg (born 1971), Norwegian film director and advertising producer
- Espen Selvik, Norwegian conductor, composer, music reviewer and writer
- Espen Skjønberg (1924–2022), Norwegian stage, screen and television actor
- Espen Søbye (born 1954), Norwegian author and literary critic
- Espen Sørensen, Danish singer and musician
- Espen Stenhammer, Norwegian singer, member of Norwegian pop rock band Di Derre
- Espen Stueland (born 1970), Norwegian poet, novelist, literary critic and essayist
- Espen Wensaas (born 1986), Norwegian musician and multi-instrumentalistm mainly mandolin, mandolin-family instruments and guitar

=== Sports people ===
- Espen Agdestein (born 1965), Norwegian chess player
- Espen Andersen (born 1961), Norwegian Nordic combined skier
- Espen Andersen (skier) (born 1993), Norwegian Nordic combined skier
- Espen Aune (born 1982), Norwegian professional strongman competitor and winner of the 2011 Norway's Strongest Man
- Espen Baardsen (born 1977), Norwegian footballer
- Espen Berg-Knutsen (born 1969), Norwegian sport shooter
- Espen Berntsen (born 1967), Norwegian football referee
- Espen Harald Bjerke (born 1980), Norwegian cross-country skier
- Espen Bjervig (born 1972), Norwegian cross-country skier
- Espen Borge (born 1961), Norwegian runner specializing in 1500 metres and 3000 metres steeplechase
- Espen Børufsen (born 1988), Norwegian footballer
- Espen Bredesen (born 1968), Norwegian ski jumper
- Espen Christensen (born 1985), Norwegian handball player
- Espen Garnås (born 1994), Norwegian footballer
- Espen Giljane (born 1962), Norwegian ballet teacher and dancer
- Espen Hagh (born 1974), Norwegian footballer
- Espen Hægeland (born 1981), Norwegian footballer
- Espen Lie Hansen (born 1989), Norwegian handball player
- Espen Haug (footballer, born 1970), Norwegian footballer and coach
- Espen Hoff (born 1981), Norwegian footballer
- Espen Aarnes Hvammen (born 1988), Norwegian speed skater
- Espen Isaksen (born 1979), Norwegian footballer
- Espen Johnsen (born 1979), Norwegian footballer
- Espen Knutsen (born 1972), Norwegian ice hockey player
- Espen Kofstad (born 1987), Norwegian golfer
- Espen Lie (born 1984), Norwegian chess player
- Espen Lindqvist, Norwegian bridge player
- Espen Lysdahl (born 1990), Norwegian alpine ski racer
- Espen Minde (born 1983), Norwegian footballer
- Espen Nystuen (born 1981), Norwegian footballer
- Espen Olsen (born 1979), Norwegian footballer
- Espen Bugge Pettersen (born 1980), Norwegian footballer
- Espen Rian (born 1981), Norwegian Nordic combined skier
- Espen Ruud (born 1984), Norwegian footballer
- Espen Søgård (born 1979), Norwegian footballer
- Espen Stokkeland (born 1968), Norwegian sailor and Olympic medalist
- Espen Tveit (born 1991), Norwegian speed skater

=== Others ===
- Espen Aarseth (born 1965), Norwegian media scholar and game researcher
- Espen Berg (humanitarian) (born 1981), Norwegian humanitarian
- Espen Barth Eide (born 1964), Norwegian politician and political scientist
- Espen Hammer (born 1966), Norwegian philosopher
- Espen Egil Hansen (born 1965), Norwegian newspaper editor and publisher
- Espen Johnsen (politician) (born 1976), Norwegian politician
- Espen Rostrup Nakstad (born 1975), Norwegian physician

== Middle name ==
- B. Espen Eckbo, American economist and professor
- Jon Espen Lohne (born 1964), Norwegian businessperson in the media sector
- Per Espen Stoknes (born 1967), Norwegian psychologist and politician
- Trond Espen Seim (born 1971), Norwegian actor
- Carl Espen Thorbjørnsen (born 1982), better known as simply Carl Espen, Norwegian singer and songwriter, who represented Norway in the Eurovision Song Contest 2014
- Jarl Espen Ygranes (born 1979), Norwegian ice hockey player

== Surname ==
- Carl Espen (born 1982), Norwegian singer and songwriter

== See also ==
- European Society for Clinical Nutrition and Metabolism known also as ESPEN
- Simen & Espen, known as music producers Seeb (or SEEB / SeeB), Norwegian EDM record production duo made up of Simen Eriksrud and Espen Berg
