= Ansgar (name) =

- Gender: masculine
- Language: Germanic

Origin
- Meaning: "god" + "spear"

Ansgar (Latinized Ansgarius; Old Norse Ásgeirr) is a Germanic given name, composed of the elements ans ("god"), and gar ("spear").

Ansgar is the Old High German form of the name. The form Asger was in use in Denmark in the medieval period. The Old English cognate of the name is Ōsgār (the given name Oscar is however thought to be of Irish origin). The name might come from when the Vikings spread through Ireland. Modern variants of the name include Norwegian Asgeir, Icelandic and Faroese Ásgeir, and Danish Asger, Eske, Esge, Asgar, Asker.

== List of people ==
Notable people with the given name:

=== Medieval ===
- Saint Ansgar (801 – 865), Archbishop of Hamburg-Bremen who was active in the Christianization of Scandinavia
- Anscar I of Ivrea (d. 902), Margrave of Ivrea
- Anscar of Spoleto (d. 940), Duke of Spoleto
- Osgar (d. 984), English abbot
- Ansgar the Staller (c. 1025–1068), Anglo-Saxon nobleman
- Ansger de Montaigu (fl. 1086), Domesday tenant-in-chief
- Ansger (bishop of Catania) (r. 1091–1124)

=== Modern ===
Ansgar

- Ansgar Beckermann (b. 1945), German philosopher
- Ansgar Elde (1933 – 2000), Swedish artist
- Ansgar Gabrielsen (b. 1955), Norwegian politician
- Ansgar Knauff (b. 2002), German footballer

Asgeir

- Asgeir Almås (born 1948), Norwegian politician
- Asgeir Årdal (born 1983), Norwegian cross-country skier
- Asgeir Dølplads (1932–2023), Norwegian ski jumper
- Asgeir Mickelson (born 1969), Norwegian musician, artist, photographer and music reviewer

Ásgeir

- Ásgeir Ásgeirsson (1894–1972), second President of Iceland, from 1952 to 1968
- Ásgeir Gunnar Ásgeirsson (born 1980), Iceland football (soccer) player
- Ásgeir Elíasson (1949–2007), football (soccer) manager and national coach
- Ásgeir Örn Hallgrímsson (born 1984), Icelandic handball player
- Ásgeir Helgason (born 1957), Icelandic scientist
- Ásgeir Jónsson, Icelandic economist, teacher and author
- Ásgeir Sigurgeirsson, Icelandic sport shooter and Olympian
- Ásgeir Sigurvinsson (born 1955), Icelandic football (soccer) player and coach
- Ásgeir Trausti (born 1992), Icelandic singer, songwriter, known by his mononym Ásgeir

Asger

See Asger

== See also ==
- Kong Asgers Høj, large passage grave on the island of Møn in Denmark
- Oslac
- Osred
- Axel
- Asbjørn
- Åsmund
- Astle
- Ascari, Italian surname
