= Osborn (surname) =

Osborn is a patronymic surname derived from the Old English first name Osbeorn and possibly the Old Norse name Ásbjörn, such as the Old Norman first name Osbern, carrying several meanings. The Old English origin is "God's Warrior" or God-bear as the name is derived from the elements "ōs" (god, divinity) and "beorn" (bear or warrior), interpreted as one blessed by God. The Old Norse origin is "Divine Bear" or "Godly Bear" from the Norse elements "ás" (god) and "bjorn" (bear), suggesting strength and divinity.

== Fictional characters ==
- Norman Osborn/Green Goblin, a fictional character from Spider-Man
  - Harry Osborn, son of Norman Osborn
    - Normie Osborn, son of Harry Osborn
    - Liz Osborn, ex-wife of Harry Osborn

== Literature and arts ==
- Alex Faickney Osborn (1888–1966), American author
- Daisy Osborn (1888–1957), New Zealand artist
- John Jay Osborn, Jr. (1945–2022), American novelist, writer, and legal scholar
- Paul Osborn (1901–1988), playwright and screenwriter
- Robert C. Osborn (1904–1994), American satiric cartoonist, illustrator and author
- Joe Osborn (1937–2018), American electric bass player

== Military ==
- Sir George Osborn, 4th Baronet (1742–1818), British military officer and MP, son of Danvers Osborn
- Henry Osborn (Royal Navy officer) (1694–1771), naval officer and Commodore Governor of Newfoundland
- John Robert Osborn (1899–1941), Canadian war hero
- Philip Osborn, British air force officer and Chief of Defence Intelligence
- Sherard Osborn (1822–1875), English military officer
- Thomas W. Osborn (1833–1898), American military officer and politician

== Politics ==
- Albert L. Osborn (1858–1940), American state politician
- Blayne Osborn, American politician
- Chase Osborn (1860–1949), American politician
- Dan Osborn, American union leader and politician
- Sir Danvers Osborn, 3rd Baronet (1715–1753), colonial governor of New York in 1753
- David L. Osborn (1921–1994), United States ambassador
- Sir John Osborn, 5th Baronet (1772–1848), English politician
- Jones Osborn (1921–2014), American politician and newspaper editor
- Laura Freele Osborn (1866–1955), American educator and politician
- Sidney Preston Osborn (1884–1948), American politician

== Science ==
- Elburt F. Osborn (1911–1998), American geochemist
- Francis C. Osborn, Sr. (1856–1926), American inventor
- Frederick Osborn (1889–1981), American eugenicist
- Henry Fairfield Osborn (1857–1935), American geologist and paleontologist
- Herbert Osborn (1856–1954), American entomologist
- Hugh Osborn, British physicist
- John Jay Osborn, American physician
- Mary Jane Osborn (1927–2019), American molecular biologist

== Sports ==
- Ben Osborn (born 1994) English footballer
- Dan Osborn (baseball), American baseball player
- Harold Osborn (1899–1975), American athlete
- John Osborn (sailor) (born 1945), British Olympic sailor
- K. J. Osborn (born 1997), American football player
- Philip Osborn (swimmer), English swimmer

== Others ==
- Albert S. Osborn (1858–1946), American questioned document examiner
- Arthur Osborn (murderer) (1905–1928), executed for the murder of Fred N. Selak, the Hermit of Grand Lake, Colorado
- Denise R. Osborn, Australian and British economist
- Derrill Osborn, American fashion executive
- Eric Osborn (1922–2007), Australian theologian
- Henry Fairfield Osborn, Jr. (1887–1969), American environmentalist
- Howard J. Osborn (1918–1984), Director of Security at the CIA
- Jared Osborn (born 1986), American-Canadian Anglican bishop
- Jeannette Lawrence Osborn (1912–1984), American clubwoman
- John E. Osborn (lawyer) (born 1957), American lawyer, health care industry executive, diplomat
- Richard Osborn, American educator, president of Pacific Union College (2001–2009)
- Samuel Osborn (surgeon) (1848–1936), British surgeon
- Theodore Osborn (1887–1973), Professor of botany in Australia
- William A. Osborn (born 1947), American banker
- William Church Osborn (1862–1951), American philanthropist
- William H. Osborn (1820–1894), 19th-century railroad tycoon

== See also ==
- George Osborn (disambiguation)
- Osborne (disambiguation)
- Osbourne (disambiguation)
- Osborn (disambiguation)
- Osbern (disambiguation)
- Osburn (surname)
