= Asbjørn =

Asbjørn is a Norwegian and Danish male given name. In 2013, there were more than 7,000 men in Norway with this name. In Norway it reached the peak of its popularity between 1910 and 1930, during which period approximately 1% of children were given the name.

The name is a combination of the words as, i.e. a god in the Norse pantheon, and bjørn, meaning bear. (Bjørn can also be used as a given name by itself.)

== Variants ==
Variants include Espen and Esben. In Swedish, the equivalent is Esbjörn.

The English surnames Osborn, Osborne, Osbourne and Usborne come from Asbjørn or the same route.

== Notable people ==
=== Asbjørn ===
- Asbjørn Andersen (disambiguation)
- Asbjørn Halvorsen (1898–1955), Norwegian footballer
- Asbjørn Hansen (1930–2017), Norwegian footballer
- Asbjørn Haugstvedt (1926–2008), Norwegian politician
- Asbjørn Jordahl (1932–2025), Norwegian journalist and politician
- Asbjørn Lindboe (1889–1967), Norwegian politician
- Asbjørn Midtgaard (born 1997), Danish basketballer
- Asbjørn Ruud (1919–1989), Norwegian ski jumper
- Asbjørn Sennels (born 1979), Danish footballer
- Asbjørn Sunde (1909–1985), Norwegian sailor
- Asbjørn Tenden (born 1975), Norwegian footballer
- Asbjørn Wahl (born 1951), Norwegian researcher and author

=== Ásbjǫrn ===
- Ásbjǫrn skerjablesi (died 874), ruler of the Hebrides
