= Osburn (surname) =

Osburn is a surname. Notable people with the surname include:

- Bennie Osburn (fl. 1990s–2010s), Dean of the School of Veterinary Medicine at UC Davis
- Carl Osburn (1884–1966), United States Navy officer
- Carroll D. Osburn (fl. 1990s–2010s), American religious scholar
- Lucy Osburn (1836–1891), English nurse
- Mary Osburn Adkinson (born Mary Osburn; 1843–1918), American social reformer active in the temperance movement
- Mike Osburn (born 1968), member of the Oklahoma House of Representatives
- Pat Osburn (born 1949), American baseball pitcher
- Randy Osburn (born 1952), Canadian ice hockey left winger
- Raymond Carroll Osburn (1872–1955), American zoologist
- Rey Osburn, vocalist and instrumentalist in the band, Tinfed
- Ruth Osburn (1912–1994), American athlete who competed mainly in the discus

== See also ==
- Osborn (surname)
- Osborne (name)
- Osbern
- Mrs. Osburn House, historic home built about 1850 in Durham, Greene County, New York
