= Ernest Osborne =

Ernest Osborne may refer to:

- Ernest Osborne (cricketer) (1873–1926), Australian cricketer
- Ernest Osborne (footballer) (1899–1958), English footballer

== See also ==
- Frederick Ernest Osborne (1878–1948), Canadian politician and businessman
- Tiny Osborne (Earnest Preston Osborne, 1893–1969), American pitcher in Major League Baseball
