= Hiccup (disambiguation) =

A hiccup is an involuntary contraction of the diaphragm.

Hiccup may also refer to:

- Hiccup (film), official title Hichki, a 2018 Indian film directed by Sidharth Malhotra
- Hiccups (TV series), the Canadian 2010–2011 television comedy
- "Hiccup", a song by Pink from her 2000 album Can't Take Me Home
- Hiccup Horrendous Haddock III, the main protagonist of the How to Train Your Dragon franchise
- Mr. Hiccup, an Italian animated series
