= Thomas Burr Osborne =

Thomas Burr Osborne may refer to:

- Thomas Burr Osborne (politician) (1798–1869), U.S. Representative from Connecticut
- Thomas Burr Osborne (chemist) (1859–1929), American chemist, co-discoverer of Vitamin A

== See also ==
- Thomas Osborne (disambiguation)
