= Meanwell =

Meanwell is a surname. Notable people with the surname include:

- Jack Meanwell (1919–2005), Canadian artist and art teacher
- Walter Meanwell (1884–1953), English college men's basketball coach
