= Carlos Lopez (artist) =

American painter (1908–1953)

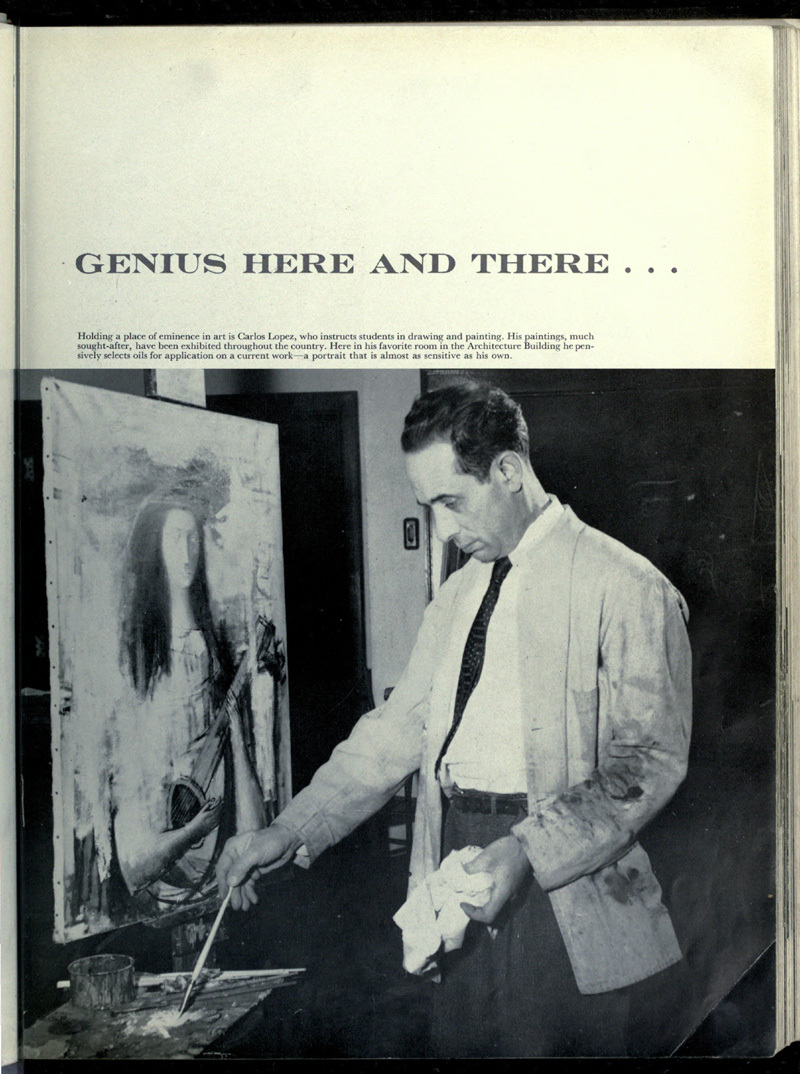
- Carlos Lopez, University of Michigan 1952
- Born: May 24, 1908; Havana, Cuba
- Died: January 6, 1953 (aged 44); Michigan
- Education: Meinzinger Art School

Carlos Lopez (May 24, 1908 – January 6, 1953) was a Havana-born early 20th century American artist, recognized for his New Deal-era murals in Michigan, Illinois, and Washington, D.C.

Highly regarded in his own time, although considered “forgotten” by the 1990s, Lopez worked extensively for the War Department during World War II and was published in Life magazine.

== Background ==
Carlos Lopez was born in Havana, Cuba, on May 24, 1908, and spent his childhood in Spain. After being raised mostly in Spain and immigrating to the United States in 1919 with his mother and siblings, Carlos Lopez first worked at the Ford Rouge River Plant. He studied for three years at the Detroit Art Academy, then attend the Detroit Art Academy where he met his wife, Rhoda LeBlanc Lopez, who was a sculptor, medical illustrator, and painter who would assist him with his mural projects, as well as at the Art Institute of Chicago, and with Leon Makielski.

He was remembered by his son as a devoted family man yet “an obsessed painter who spent most every day either teaching or working on his art. His health was never great, and he was nearly deaf for much of his adult life.” He became a well-known painter in Michigan, and during President Franklin D. Roosevelt's New Deal program, the Works Progress Administration, he received five commissions to create murals in Michigan, Illinois, and Washington D.C.

Lopez was the director of the Detroit Art Academy from 1933 to 1937 and from 1937 to 1942 he taught at the Meinzinger Art School in Detroit.

He taught art at the University of Michigan from 1945 until his death in 1953. Lopez was the only Latinx professor at the School of Art and Design until 2017. Carlos Lopez was remembered as popular professor, known for his loyalty and devotion to his students which they admired for his support and his wisdom. He was remembered for often telling his students, "I can teach you to draw, but I cannot teach you to be an artist."

== Art works ==
=== Plymouth Trail (1938) - WPA Mural, Post Office in Plymouth, Michigan ===
In 1936, Carlos Lopez created Plymouth Trail mural for a new post office in Plymouth as requested by Wyatt O. Hendrick and Louis Simon. The Plymouth Trail describe to be a distinguished of colorful historical scene setting for it invites the viewers to reflect upon the industrialization and capitalist development in each narratives in the paintings. The lower three panels illustrated the narrative of Plymouth's pioneer history during the 1930s while the main painting present a simple scene of transportation and trade in small town at 1860s. The Michigan post office's murals deploy allegory to celebrated the bounty of the American landscapes, Lopez's mural created a zone that critique the narratives of histories of racism, labor, and settler-colonialism.

Lopez and other artists were requested to capture the “American style” of realistically portraying the ordinary citizens from different parts of communities. They were encouraged to produce works that were appropriate to the communities and be in accessible open locations for the citizens while keeping in mind to avoid controversial subjects. Lopez focused on the future of communities and businesses in his work while it displayed the narrative form of historical events in an uplifting tone.

=== Bounty (1940) - WPA Mural, Post Office in Paw Paw, Michigan ===
In 1940, Carlos Lopez created the Bounty mural for the post office in Paw Paw, MI. Using a distinct illustrative style reflective of American popular culture, the upper panel of the mural shows the rich agricultural bounty of the prosperous Michigan farming communities of Van Buren County. The lower panel of the mural, painted in small sections between the postmaster door and bulletin boards, hints at a subterranean scene of tree roots, bedrock and coal seams.

=== The Death of Colonel Shaw at Fort Wagner (1942) - WPA Mural, Recorder of Deeds Building, Washington D.C. ===
In 1942, Carlos Lopez joined World War II as a war artist with the US War Department. They requested him to be part of the “Soldiers of Production” to create visual records of tanks and anti-aircraft guns’ war production in the United States. The Works Process Administration-era mural were used to portraying the realistic into the community, and Lopez decided to create an artwork to record the deeds of African Americans. Lopez's Shaw at Fort Wagner reflect the historical event of Young-Union African American soldiers facing in battle grounds during Civil War. The painting illustrated the scene of memorable moment during the assaulted at Fort Wanger in 1863 where Union Colonel Robert Gould Shaw died during the battle as black soldiers carried his body away from the battlefield. His work been displayed to the Recorder of Deeds building that was housed in the DC Court of Appeals before became part of Cultural Tourism DC attraction as part of African American Heritage Trail.

=== Pioneer Society's Picnic (1942) - WPA Mural, Post Office in Birmingham, Michigan ===
Lopez has faced heavy criticism that is considered controversial for the disagreement of the appearance in one of his murals, “Pioneer Society’s Picnic”. In 1942, Lopez received a $1,400 government-sponsored commission to paint a tempera mural in the Birmingham, Michigan post office. They wanted a mural to be displayed on the east wall above a bulletin board to open the new post office. Lopez selected the image from 1850 of the residents in Birmingham and Oakland County gathered for an annual picnic for his typical pioneer scene. Lopez added details if early historical photographs and portraits of a few Birmingham residents that he used as models during the creation of the mural. The features in the mural were taken from other sources as part of inspiration like Leonardo da Vinci's The Virgin and Child with St. Anne and the Infant St. John of 1498. During the production of his painting, the community started to feel hostile towards Lopez for not only being the outsider, but they also accused him of being unfamiliar with their culture due to subjects’ racial features in his mural. His mural was almost destroyed but was protected by Joseph Sparks and Zoltan Sepeshy, director of Cranbrook Academy of Art and Lopez's old friend.

== Exhibitions ==
Solo Exhibitions

- Figura: Micro Macro, Durden and Ray. Los Angeles California, USA
- Sight Unseen, Abend Gallery, Golden Triangle. Denver, Colorado, USA.
- Carlos Lopez: A Forgotten Michigan Painter, Brauer Museum of Art. Valparaiso, Indiana, USA.

Group Exhibitions

- In 1950, Lopez's paintings were included in an “American Paintings Today” exhibition at Metropolitan Museum of Art in New York City.

== Collections ==
- His work is in the collections of the Detroit Institute of Art, the University of Michigan Museum of Art (UMMA), and the Henry Ford Museum.
- Estate of Carlos Lopez is the collection of Carlos Lopez Artwork in Brauer Museum of Art Valparaiso University, Valparaiso, Indiana, USA.
- Valparaiso University holds US Navy Art Collection.
- Recorder of Deeds Building, African American Heritage Trail, Cultural Tourism DC
- Westborn Market, Plymouth, Michigan. Hoisting Anti-Aircraft Gun(1942) is in the collection of the Smithsonian American Art Museum
- Wayne State University holds four of his paintings.
- Detroit Mercy Law School
- Birmingham, Michigan Post Office

== Honors and rewards ==
Detroit Art Shows

- Friends of Modern Art Prize in 1936
- Han Prize in 1937
- Scarab Club of Detroit - Gold Medal in 1938
- Kamperman Prize in 1940
- Hars Prize in 1941
- Whitcorn Prize in 1941, 1943 and 1944
- Art Founders Society Prize in 1946.

One of 15 winners of the Pepsi Cola "Paintings of the Year" contest in 1948.

== Death ==
Carlos Lopez died on January 6, 1953, from a heart attack at the age of 44. He was survived by his wife Rhoda, a 12-year-old son, John, and his 16-year-old daughter. His family donated many of his works of art, and moved to San Diego, where his wife became an art professor at UC San Diego Extension school and founded an art community center.

Carlos Lopez painted one of the seven 1943 murals at the D.C. Recorder of Deeds Building that depict African-American contributions to the nation's history
