= Exit strategy =

How to leave a tense situation

An exit strategy is a means of leaving one's current situation, either after a predetermined objective has been achieved, or as a strategy to mitigate failure. An organisation or individual without an exit strategy may be in a quagmire. At worst, an exit strategy will save face; at best, an exit strategy will deliver an objective worth more than the cost of continuing the execution of a previous plan considered "deemed to fail" by weight of the present situation.

== In warfare ==
In military strategy, an exit strategy is understood to minimise losses of what military jargon called "blood and treasure" (lives and material).

The term was used technically in internal Pentagon critiques of the Vietnam War (cf. President Richard Nixon's promise of Peace With Honor), but remained obscure to the general public until the Battle of Mogadishu, Somalia when the U.S. military involvement in that U.N. peacekeeping operation cost the lives of U.S. troops without a clear objective. Republican critics of President Bill Clinton derided him for having no exit strategy, although he had inherited an active military operation from his predecessor, President George H. W. Bush. The criticism was revived later against the U.S. involvement in the Yugoslav wars, including peacekeeping operations in Bosnia and Kosovo and the Kosovo war against Serbia.

The term has been adopted by critics of U.S. involvement in Afghanistan and especially Iraq. President George W. Bush was said to have no exit strategy to remove troops from Iraq, and critics worried about the number of Coalition soldiers and Iraqi civilians who would suffer injury or death as a result. President Barack Obama did not publicly announce an exit strategy for the troops in Afghanistan.

Donald Trump has been questioned about his exit strategy in the 2026 Iran War, by The Hill, The Straits Times, and Joe Rogan.

== In public policy ==
An exit strategy may operate as a means of implementing the termination of a policy or to demonstrate that termination is feasible, for example from joining the Euro.

== In business ==
In entrepreneurship and strategic management an exit strategy or exit plan is a way to transition the ownership of a company to another company (e.g. through a merger or acquisition), to investors (e.g. through an initial public offering) or to the owner's children or family. Other types of exit strategies include management buyouts and employee buyouts. Winding up a company, whether through a bankruptcy or voluntary dissolution, is also an exit strategy. Bringing on board strategic or financial partners may be considered a form of exit, albeit a partial exit, as it may help ensure succession and survival of the business.

Exit strategies are also used to ensure businesses are prepared for the termination of significant contracts or other business relationships. "There are many reasons why contracts come to an end, including non-performance by one or both parties, a significant change in the requirements of either party, or that the contract has run its course. In almost all cases, having a well-developed exit strategy is critical. The strategy is usually developed as the means by which to withdraw from a working relationship with a supplier. It can incorporate the process of returning assets, transferring back key employees and the conditions under which a relationship can terminate, for example, the failure to meet service level agreements, changes in circumstances, and ethical breaches".

Transition companies are professional mergers and acquisitions companies that assist business owners with their exit strategy. Services offered are often referred to as transition management services.

== Criticisms ==
It has been argued that over-fixation on exit strategies can lead to defeatism.

== See also ==
- Surrender
- Withdrawal
- Iraq Study Group Report
- Pyrrhic victory
- No-win situation
- Vietnam War § US exit and final campaigns, 1973–1975
- Outsourcing
- Reshoring
