= William Osborne =

William Osborne or Osborn may refer to:

- Bill Osborne (born 1955), New Zealand rugby player
- Qwominer William Osborne, British Virgin Islands politician
- Will Osborne (rugby) (1875–?), Welsh rugby player
- Will Osborne (singer) (1905–1981), Canadian singer
- William Osborne (artist) (1823–1901), Irish portrait and animal painter
- William Osborne (umpire), National League umpire in 1876
- William Osborne (writer) (born 1960), English writer
- William Alexander Osborne (1873–1967), Australian professor of Physiology
- William G. Osborne in District Attorney's Office v. Osborne, a U.S. Supreme Court case
- William H. Osborne (born 1960), president and CEO of Federal Signal Corporation
- Sir William Osborne, 8th Baronet (died 1783), Irish baronet and politician
- William Osborn (Medal of Honor) (1837–1887), American soldier
- William A. Osborn (born 1947), American bank executive
- William Church Osborn (1862–1951), New York State Democratic Committee Chairman
- William H. Osborn (1821–1894), American railroad tycoon
- William Evelyn Osborn (1868–1906), British artist

== See also ==
- William Osbourne (disambiguation)
