= Eckbo =

Eckbo is a surname. Notable people with the surname include:

- B. Espen Eckbo (born 1952), American economist
- Eivind Eckbo (1927–2017), Norwegian politician, lawyer and farmer
- Espen Eckbo (born 1973), Norwegian actor, writer and comedian
- Garrett Eckbo (1910–2000), American landscape architect

== See also ==
- Eckbo, Dean, Austin and Williams (EDAW), international landscape architecture, urban and environmental design firm
