= Charles Osborne =

Charles Osborne may refer to:

- Charles Osborne (politician), MP (1759–1817), Irish politician and judge
- Sir Charles Osborne, 14th Baronets. (1825–1879), Irish baronet of the Osborne baronets
- Charles Osborne (American football) (ca. 1885 – ? ), American football player and coach
- Charles Nelson Osborne better known as Uncle Charlie Osborne (1890–1992), American folk musician
- Charles Osborne (farmer) (1893/1894–1991), American farmer who suffered from hiccups for 68 years
- Charles Osborne (music writer) (1927–2017), Australian-born writer on classical music and of Agatha Christie adaptations
- Chuck Osborne (1939–1979), American professional basketball player
- Chuck Osborne (American football) (1973–2012), American football player

== See also ==
- Charles Creagh-Osborne (1823–1892), British Army officer
- Charles F. Osborn (1847–?), American politician
