= Lohne =

Lohne may refer to:

== People ==
- Jon Espen Lohne (born 1964), a Norwegian businessperson in the media sector

== Places ==
=== Germany ===
- Lohne, Germany, a town in the Vechta district in the western part of Lower Saxony
- Lohne, a large part of the town of Wietmarschen in Grafschaft Bentheim county in the western part of Lower Saxony
- Gartenstadt Lohne, a part of the municipality of Isernhagen in the Hanover district in the southern part of Lower Saxony
- Löhne, a town in the Herford district in the northeastern part of the state of North Rhine-Westphalia
- Lohne (river), a river in the state of Lower Saxony

=== Norway ===
- Lohne, Norway, a small village in Kristiansand Municipality in Agder county
