= Osbern =

Osbern is a given name. Variants include Osbearn and Osbarn.

Notable people with the name include:

- Osbeorn Bulax (died 1054), son of Siward of Northumbria
- Osbern the Steward a.k.a. Osbern de Crépon (died c. 1040), steward and seneschal of two Norman dukes
- Osbern Pentecost (d.1054) pre conquest Norman knight in England and Scotland
- Osbern FitzOsbern a.k.a. Osbern of Exeter (died 1103), Bishop of Exeter, Osbern the Steward's son and William FitzOsbern's brother
- Osbern of Canterbury (died 1090), English Benedictine monk
- Osbern of Westminster a.k.a. Osbert of Clare (died c. 1158), English Benedictine monk, abbot and author
- Osbern of Gloucester (died 1200), English Benedictine monk and hagiographer
- Osbern Bokenam (died c. 1447), English poet
- Osbern fitzRichard, Anglo-Norman baron, Richard FitzScrope's son
- Osbern FitzHugh, descendant of Richard FitzScrope's family

== See also ==
- Osborn (surname)
- Osborne (name)
- Osburn (surname)
- Osbourne (disambiguation)
