= Ascari =

Ascari can refer to:

- Ascari (surname), an Italian surname
- Askari, a colonial soldier
  - Eritrean Ascari
- Ascari, an Italian Soldati-class destroyer
- Ascari Cars, a British automobile manufacturer
- Ascari Bicycles, a bicycle manufacturer in the US
- Circuito Ascari, a resort with a motorsports track in Málaga, Spain
- Ascari Corner (Variante Ascari), a corner on Monza Circuit, the motorsports track in Monza, Italy

== See also ==
- Ascaris, a nematode worm
