= Asger =

- Gender: Male

Origin
- Origin: Old Norse
- Meaning: "Gods" (Æsir, or ás) + "spear" (geirr)
- Region of origin: Denmark

Other names
- Related names: Ansgar, Ansgar, Ansgeir, Ásgeir

Asger is a predominantly Danish language masculine given name derived from the Old Norse elements Æsir or ás, meaning "gods" and geirr, meaning "spear".

Individuals bearing the name Asger include:

- Asger Aaboe (1922–2007), Danish historian of the exact sciences and mathematician
- Asger Christensen (born 1958), Danish politician
- Asger Lund Christiansen (1927–1998), Danish cellist and composer
- Asger Hamerik, also Hammerich, (1843–1923), Danish composer of classical music
- Asger Jorn (1914–1973), Danish painter, sculptor, ceramic artist, and author
- Asger Ostenfeld (1866–1931), Danish civil engineer
- Asger Sørensen (born 1996), Danish footballer
- Asger Svendsen, Danish professor music, performer of bassoon, woodwind and chamber music
