= Goehring =

Goehring or Göhring is a German surname. Notable people with the surname include:

- Hermann Göring (1893–1946), German politician and military leader
- Alan Goehring (born 1962), American poker player
- Dietmar Göhring (born 1960), German swimmer
- Doug Goehring, American politician
- Karl Goehring (born 1978), American ice hockey player
- Kate Goehring, American actress
- Kenneth O. Goehring (1919–2007), American painter
- Leo Goehring (1891–1967), American track and field athlete
- Nicole Goehring (born 1976), Canadian politician
- Oswald Helmuth Göhring (1889 – c. 1915), German chemist
- Margot Becke-Goehring (1914–2009), German chemist
