= Peter Osborne =

Peter Osborne may refer to:

- Sir Peter Osborne, 17th Baronet (born 1943), British businessman and father of George Osborne
- Peter Osborne (philosopher) (born 1958), writer and an academic teaching philosophy at Kingston University
- Peter Osborne (Keeper of the Privy Purse) (1521–1592), Keeper of the Privy Purse to King Edward VI
- Peter Osborne (1584–1653), English administrator and Member of Parliament

== See also ==
- Peter Oborne (born 1957), British journalist
- Osborne (disambiguation)
