= Esben =

Esben is a Norwegian and Danish male given name.

== Origin and variants ==
It originated as a variant of Asbjørn. A common variant is Espen.

== Notable people ==
Notable people with this name include:

- Esben Sloth Andersen, Danish professor of economics
- Esben Holmboe Bang, Danish chef and Michelin-starred restaurateur
- Esben Esther Pirelli Benestad, Norwegian physician and sexologist
- Esben Hansen, Danish football midfielder
- Esben Selvig, Norwegian-Danish rapper and singer
- Esben Smed, Danish actor
- Esben Storm, Danish-Australian actor and director

== Other uses ==
- Esben and the Witch, Danish fairytale
- Esben and the Witch (band), British rock band
