= Osborne =

Osborne may refer to:

- Osborne (name)

== Places ==
=== Australia ===
- Osborne, South Australia (disambiguation), places associated with the suburb in the Adelaide metropolitan area
- Osborne, New South Wales, a rural community in the Riverina region

=== Canada ===
- Osborne (Manitoba riding), a former provincial electoral district
- Osborne, Lambton County, Ontario
- Osborne, Manitoba, a hamlet
- Osborne Township, Ontario
- Osborne Village, a neighbourhood in Winnipeg, Manitoba

=== United Kingdom ===
- Osborne Bay, Isle of Wight

=== United States ===
- Osborne, Kansas, a city
- Osborne, Pennsylvania, a borough, renamed Glen Osborne
- Osborne County, Kansas
- Osborne Township, Pipestone County, Minnesota

== Companies ==
- Osborne Group, winery company in Spain
- Osborne (computer retailer), an Australian computer retailer
- Osborne Computer Corporation, computer company created by Adam Osborne
  - Osborne 1 portable computer

== Other uses ==
- The Osborne, a historic apartment building in Manhattan, New York, United States
- Osborne Association, a New York-based criminal justice reform and direct service organization
- Osborne bull, the unofficial national emblem of Spain
- Osborne effect, a social phenomenon
- HMY Osborne (1870), a royal yacht of the United Kingdom
- USS Osborne (DD-295), a Clemson-class destroyer in the United States Navy

== See also ==
- Osborn (disambiguation)
- Osbourne (disambiguation)
- Osborne House (disambiguation)
- Osborne Park (disambiguation)
- Usborne (disambiguation)
