= Thumps =

Thumps is a condition that occurs in horses where there is an irregular spasming of the diaphragm, usually caused by dehydration due to fluid loss and related abnormal electrolyte levels, most often blood calcium. It is similar to hiccups, but in horses it usually has a more serious underlying cause than in the corresponding human condition. Another condition that can cause thumps is diarrhea. For that reason, a case of thumps requires immediate veterinary attention. It is most often seen in horses used for endurance riding but also occurs in other equine athletes. Clinical signs include sound coming from the horse's abdomen, which also can be seen contracting with the animal's heartbeat, but at rates of 40-50 times per minute. The condition was first identified by a veterinarian in 1831.
