= Esbjörn =

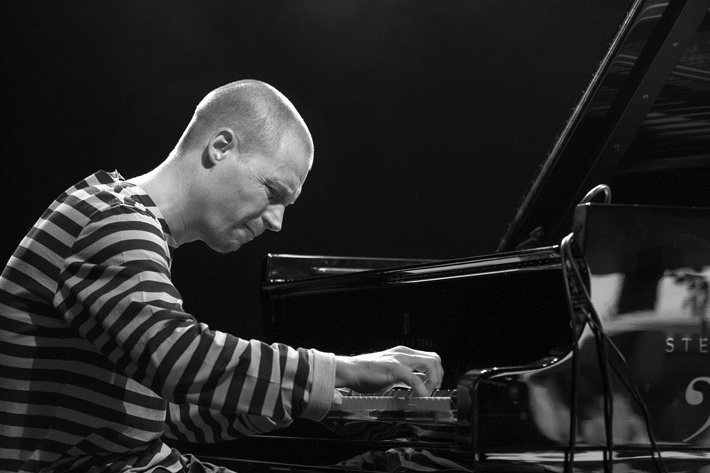
Esbjörn Svensson, Swedish jazz pianist

Esbjörn is a Swedish name.

People with surname Esbjörn:

- Lars Paul Esbjörn (1808–1870), Swedish-American Lutheran clergyman

People with given name Esbjörn:

- Esbjörn Segelod (b. 1951), Swedish organizational theorist
- Esbjörn Svensson (1964–2008), Swedish jazz pianist
- Esbjörn Larsson (1900-1936), youngest son and frequent childhood model of Swedish painter Carl Larsson

== See also ==
- Esbjörn Svensson Trio
- Espen
