= Eadred (given name) =

Eadred or Edred is an Anglo-Saxon masculine personal name, from ēad "wealth, fortune; prosperous" and ræd "counsel". Notable people with the name include:

- Eadred (923–955), king of England
- Eadred (bishop) (died 1042), Bishop of Durham
- Eadred Lulisc (fl. late 9th century), abbot of Carlisle
- Eadred Ætheling (died c. 1012), a son of King Æthelred the Unready
- Stephen Edred Flowers (born c. 1953), American occultist
- Edred John Henry Corner (1906–1996), English botanist and mycologist
- Edred Utomi (born 1991), Nigerian-American stage actor

== See also ==
- Ealdred
- Adderstone
- Eldridge (disambiguation)
- Osred
