= William Osbourne =

William Osbourne may refer to:

- William Osbourne (MP) for Rochester (UK Parliament constituency)
- William Osbourne (screenwriter) of Kevin of the North

== See also ==
- William Osborne (disambiguation)
