= Stanley Twardowicz =

American painter

- Born: July 8, 1917
- Died: June 12, 2008 (aged 90)
- Education: Meinzinger Art School
- Style: Abstract Expressionism

Stanley Twardowicz (July 8, 1917 – June 12, 2008) was an American abstract painter, photographer, and educator associated with the second generation of Abstract Expressionism and later Color Field painting. Born in Detroit, Michigan, he studied at the Meinzinger Art School during World War II while also working in a tank factory.

In 1946, Twardowicz received a scholarship to the Skowhegan School of Painting and Sculpture in Maine, where he studied alongside prominent artists and educators including Yasuo Kuniyoshi, Jack Levine, and Philip Guston. He later taught at Ohio State University, where he became acquainted with fellow instructor Roy Lichtenstein. Following periods spent in Mexico and Europe, Twardowicz developed an increasingly abstract style, and by 1953 was painting entirely nonrepresentational works.

During the 1950s and 1960s, Twardowicz became associated with the New York School through his frequent visits to the Cedar Tavern in Greenwich Village, where he interacted with artists including Willem de Kooning, Franz Kline, and Jackson Pollock. His work gained national attention through exhibitions at the Whitney Museum of American Art, the Solomon R. Guggenheim Museum, the Art Institute of Chicago, the Pennsylvania Academy of the Fine Arts, and other institutions. Between 1954 and 1964, his paintings were selected for five Whitney Annual Exhibitions, the predecessors of the modern Whitney Biennial.

In 1956, Twardowicz was awarded a Guggenheim Fellowship in Creative Painting. During this period he developed the poured and biomorphic abstractions that became his signature style. His work was also included in the Museum of Modern Art's travelling exhibition Young American Painters. In 1956, the Museum of Modern Art acquired his painting Number 11-1955, accession number 244.56, for its permanent collection. The work was later included in the museum's landmark 1969 exhibition The New American Painting and Sculpture: The First Generation.

Twardowicz achieved further recognition when his work appeared on the cover of Art in America's 1958 New Talent Annual. From 1958 to 1970, New York's Peridot Gallery presented annual one-man exhibitions of his paintings, establishing him as an important figure within postwar American abstraction.

In addition to painting, Twardowicz maintained an active photographic practice. Several of his photographs were selected by Edward Steichen, Director of Photography at the Museum of Modern Art, for inclusion in the museum's photography collection. His photographic work included a series of images documenting writer Jack Kerouac during the final years of the author's life. Kerouac and Twardowicz became close friends while living in Northport, New York, where Kerouac resided near Twardowicz's studio. Their friendship later became the subject of the photographic portfolio Stashou and Yasho.

Beginning in 1964, Twardowicz taught at Hofstra University on Long Island, where he remained for more than three decades and influenced generations of artists and students. Interest in his work continued throughout his later years, culminating in the 2001 retrospective exhibition Moving Color at the Phoenix Art Museum, which celebrated his contributions to Color Field painting.

Stanley Twardowicz died on June 12, 2008, in Northport, New York.

== Sources ==
- Press release after death
