= Osbourn (disambiguation) =

Osbourn is a settlement in Antigua and Barbuda.

Osbourn may also refer to:

- Osbourn High School, public school in Manassas, Virginia, U.S.
- Anne Osbourn, biology professor
- Jane Osbourn, English scientist

== See also ==
- Osborn (disambiguation)
- Osbourne (disambiguation)
