= Meinzinger Art School =

- Advertisement, September 8, 1940, the Anderson Herald
- Established: early 1930s
- Location: 4847 Woodward Avenue, subsequently 12 E. Hancock St., Detroit, Michigan; US
- Coordinates: 42°21′21″N 83°03′48″W
- Directors: Fred J. Meinzinger; Buckner Clark Coleman

The Meinzinger Art School was an art school founded by Frederick J. Meinzinger in Detroit's midtown area. The school opened in the early 1930s and closed in the late 1950s or early 1960s.

== Background ==
At times referred to as the "largest art school in the nation," the school emphasized both fine art and commercial art — the latter particularly during and after World War II.

Initially located at 4847 Woodward Avenue, and later at the corner of Woodward Avenue at 12 East Hancock Street, the school offered studies in fine arts, fashion drawing and automotive rendering — and had 700 students by the end of 1947.

The school was formed during a burgeoning period for commercial art, advertising, signage, typesetting and graphic design — and received at the time one of the largest commercial art contracts in the nation — from General Motors. In the very early days of automotive advertising, almost all work was a product of the Meinzinger school, the studios producing finished art for hundreds of advertising accounts.

Noted students included Irv Rybicki, automotive designer and later Vice President of Design at General Motors, as well as fine artists including muralist Carlos Lopez, impressionist Leon Makielski, abstract artist and photographer Stanley Twardowicz, abstract impressionists Kenneth O. Goehring and Jack Meanwell, James Donald Predergast, George Fanais, Ken Gore, and illustrators John Arvan and Greg and Tim Hildebrandt.

His December 1947 obituary noted that Fred Meinzinger, a native of Kitchener Ontario, was a prominent art authority, a pioneer in organized art studios, and the first to apply a business model to art studies.
