= Osborne, South Australia (disambiguation) =

Osborne, South Australia is a suburb in the Adelaide metropolitan area in South Australia

Osborne, South Australia may also refer to articles about places in the suburb.

- Osborne Naval Shipyard
- Osborne railway station
- Osborne Power Station

== See also ==
- Osborne (disambiguation)
