= Osborne Park =

Osborne Park may refer to:

- Osborne Park, New South Wales, a locality of Sydney
- Osborne Park, Western Australia, a suburb of Perth
- Osborne Park (Willoughby, Ohio), an urban park in the United States
