= Leon Makielski =

American artist (b. 1885, d. 1974)

- Born: May 17, 1885; Morris Run, Pennsylvania
- Died: November 1974
- Education: Meinzinger Art School
- Occupation: Artist
- Spouse: Anna Schmitt

Leon Alexander Makielski (May 17, 1885 – November 1974) was an American artist and art instructor, best known for his French Impressionist inspired landscapes and distinct portraits of his contemporaries. He resided in Michigan for the majority of his life and was extremely active in the artist communities of both Detroit and Ann Arbor.

== Early life and career ==
Born to Polish immigrants in 1885 in Morris Run, Pennsylvania, Makielski spent the greater part of his youth in South Bend, Indiana, but eventually relocated to Illinois to pursue his education in art. From 1903 until 1909 he studied at the Art Institute of Chicago; it was there that he was the recipient of the "John Quincy Adams Traveling Fellowship" four times consecutively, and, at the age of 23, became an instructor.

In 1909, Makielski traveled to Paris to study at the Academie Julian and Academie Grande Chaumiere, which was made financially possible by his patron and mentor, John Mohler Studebaker. In the village of Giverny he was able to establish himself as an artist, but it was through his travels throughout Europe that he found inspiration in the romantic countryside as depicted by the French Impressionists, and became prolific in creating eye-catching landscapes which he captured in plain air. It was through such images that he gained acceptance into the European art community and was included in the most prestigious exhibitions in 1910 and 1911: Le Salon. He was able to show two paintings both years of the exhibitions, but undoubtedly it was the "Portrait of Penelope Peterson" from Le Salon 1911 that most beautifully captures his talent in portraiture.

He returned to the U.S. in 1913 and settled in Ann Arbor, Michigan. He taught at Meinzinger Art School in Detroit, and in 1915 he began teaching at the University of Michigan. He continued his teaching career at the university until 1927 when he decided to concentrate solely on painting portraits of notable figures, which included faculty and administrators of the University of Michigan, prominent professionals and business leaders, as well as state and local politicians. In addition to teaching art at the University of Michigan and at the Meinzinger Art School, he taught at the Jewish Community Center. He was also a Works Progress Administration painter, and in 1934 Leon and his brother, architect Bronislau Makielski, were commissioned to paint a mural in the Lincoln Consolidated School District. In 1925 he was initiated into The Scarab Club, where he taught fellow members portraiture through the 1950s.

== Career in portraiture ==
Makielski's career as an artist spanned more than 70 years, in which he produced 3,000 paintings, and hundreds of drawings, sketches, and studies. He also created "Rogue's Gallery" in which he drew more than 200 charcoal portraits of his friends. He considered portraiture to be his specialty and created many solely for his own enjoyment. One of his favorites is an oil portrait of a young Robert Frost. The two met while teaching at the University of Michigan and became friends. The painting remained in his studio for over 40 years, and was later acquired by the University of Michigan in Ann Arbor. Some of his best known portraits were of other noteworthy subjects such as architect Eliel Saarinen, bridge builder Ralph Modjeski, Jessie Bonstelle, S. S. Kresge, Harlan Hatcher (former U of M president), and Laura F. Osborn (board member for Detroit Public Schools). Between 1924 and 1931, he created numerous portraits of the faculty and administrators of the University of Michigan, dozens of which are displayed in various University buildings. His portrait of Dr. Ruben Kahn is perhaps one of his most well-known portraits. Makielski was also commissioned to create portraits of Samuel Vauclain (1856–1940, engineer and inventor of the Vauclain compound locomotive and president of the Baldwin Locomotive Works) and Leopold Stokowski (1885–1947, British-born American conductor) in Philadelphia.

== Works and recognition ==
He was a nationally recognized and acclaimed artist, receiving honors from the Detroit Institute of Arts, the Art Institute of Chicago, and the St. Louis Museum of Art. The more significant of Makielski's portraits are listed in the Catalog of American Portraits, which is kept by the National Portrait Gallery of the Smithsonian Institution. Four of his oil portraits of university faculty and staff are housed at The Bentley Historical Library, three of which are in the Law School Photography and Art collection, and the other (a portrait of Harry Hutchins) is cataloged separately.

Other works of his are held in the permanent collections of the University of Michigan Museum of Art and the Minneapolis Institute of Arts.

== Personal life ==
In 1921 he married Anna Schmitt, with whom he had five children: Elizabeth, Marjorie, Edward & Donald (identical twins), and Joan. His growing family grew right along with the home that Makielski built himself—the ever changing converted barn that served as both his family's home and his artist's studio. Makielski died in 1974. Upon his death, approximately 400 works of his personal collection were discovered in his studio by his family.

== Exhibitions ==
1910, 1911

- Le Salon, Paris, France

1921

- "Annual Exhibition for Michigan Artists Under the Auspices of The Scarab Club", Detroit Institute of Arts, Detroit, MI

2002

- "Leon Makielski (1885-1974) American Impressionist", Elder Art Gallery, Charlotte, NC

2017

- Art Exhibition, Saline District Library, Saline, MI

2019

- "A Portrait of Ann Arbor: Leon Makielski Retrospective", Schmidt's Michigan Art Gallery, Ypsilanti, MI
