= Astle =

English surname

Origin
- Meaning: "god"+"cauldron" or "east hill"
- Region of origin: Mercia, England; Cheshire, England

Other names
- Variant forms: Astel, Astell, Asthul, Astill, Astles, Astull, Astyll, Oskettle, Askettle, Asketil and Ostle

Astle is an English surname of dual origins. In the East Midlands, the surname is certainly of patronymic origin. This is also a possibility in Cheshire yet the name there more probably originated as a locative surname.

== Origin in the East Midlands ==
The surname Astle originated in Mercia, England. In the East Midlands, the name was derived from the Old Norse name Ásketill, from áss meaning "Divine" and ketill meaning "cauldron".

References to a king Asketil who with three other kings in 874 sacked Repton, are found in 12th-century surveys by the Monks of Burton Abbey. This was during the campaign of King Ceolwulf II and the Great Heathen Army to overthrow King Burgred. The four kings were allocated lands in a partitioned Mercia corresponding to the modern shires of Lincoln, Nottingham, Derby and Leicester. To this day, the largest grouping of Astle families is still concentrated in a relatively small area of South Derbyshire and East Staffordshire, close to the River Trent.

== Origin in Cheshire ==
While the spelling 'Astles' prevails in Cheshire, the regular spelling of 'Astle' is also common. However, its origin in this area may be distinct. As the Danes occupied Cheshire via the west coast, it is possible that other men named 'Asketil' lent their name to the people of the region.

However, it is more likely that the name is this area derives from the hamlet of Astle, previously Asthull, a contraction of "east hill". Thus it is a locative surname.

== Alternative spellings ==
The following alternative spellings are related to the name 'Astle': Astel, Astell, Asthul, Astill, Astels, Astles, Astull, Astyll and Asketil. The surname Astley is 'not' related.

== Historical occurrences ==
The first recorded spelling of any variant of the family name dates to circa 1225 during the reign of King Henry III when the 'Episcopal Records of Lichfield', Staffordshire, make mention of 'Simon de Astell'.

The evolution of the name can be observed in the register of the Black Prince's administration (1346–1365) where it records that:

In 1365, one Robert Astel of Hazelbech, Northants, asked the Black Prince to confirm his rightful ownership of one of his lands in Hazelbech. He produced a document providing that the land had been given to 'William son of Asketil of Hazelbech and his heirs

Robert Astel was one of these heirs.

A 'Register of the Freemen of the City of York' dating from 1349 includes 'Richard de Asthul'.

== Coat of arms ==
The shield of the Astle coat of arms is gules (red) symbolising martyrdom, military strength or warriors. It contains a white cross crosslet in each corner, indicating that the family engaged in the Crusades. At its centre is a 'lion passant', the upper body of which is 'or' (gold), according to the common English tradition, while the colouring of its lower body may signify the Danish origin of the family.

=== Crest ===
The Astle family crest is a seahorse couchant ducally gorged. It originated in Staffordshire. The seahorse symbolises the power of water.

=== Motto ===
The Astle family motto is Sub cruce glorior ('The glory of the Cross').

== People ==
The following famous people have the surname 'Astle':

- Alec Astle (born 1949), former New Zealand cricketer
- David Astle (born 1961), Australian writer
- Jeff Astle (1942–2002), English association footballer
- John Astle (born 1943), American politician
- Nathan Astle (born 1971), New Zealand cricketer
- Thomas Astle (1735–1803), English antiquarian
- Todd Astle (born 1986), New Zealand cricketer
