= Asger Svendsen =

- Instrument: Bassoon

Asger Svendsen (born 22 July 1942) is a Danish bassoonist. Apart from teaching at the RDAM, he became a professor at the Music Academy in Malmö, Sweden where he is in addition leader of the woodwind education.

He was educated at the Royal Danish Academy of Music (RDAM) as a bassoonist and pianist.

Has played in most major Danish orchestras, including being solo bassoonist in the Danish Radio Symphony Orchestra.
