= Osred =

Osred is an Anglo-Saxon masculine personal name, from ós "god" and ræd "counsel", that may refer to:

- Osred I of Northumbria (c. 697 – 716), king of Northumbria
- Osred II of Northumbria, king of Northumbria from 789 to 790

== See also ==
- Eadred (given name)
- Oslac
- Ethelred
- Ansgar (name)
