= Bennie Osburn =

Bennie I. Osburn was the Dean of the School of Veterinary Medicine at UC Davis. He was appointed in 1996 and reappointed for another 5-year term by Chancellor Larry Vanderhoef in 2006. He retired as dean in 2011, and was succeeded by Dr. Michael Lairmore.

May 26, 2009 – Medical Management International, Inc. (MMI), which operates under the name Banfield, The Pet Hospital, appointed Bennie I. Osburn, DVM, Ph.D., DACVP to its board of directors.

Dean Osburn earned his BS and DVM degrees at Kansas State University and a Ph.D. in Comparative Pathology at the University of California, Davis.

== Awards ==
- 1. In 2004 the American Veterinary Medicine Association awarded Dr. Osburn the Karl F. Meyer-James H. Steele Gold Head Cane Award. Sponsored by Hartz Mountain Corp., the award was given in honor and recognition of Dr. Osburn's achievements in animal health that advanced human health through the practice of veterinary epidemiology and public health.
