= Ausburn =

Ausburn is a surname and given name. Notable people with the name include:

- Charles Ausburn (1889–1917), received the United States Navy Cross posthumously for gallantry in World War I
- Ausburn Birdsall (1814–1903), U.S. Representative from New York

== See also ==
- USS Charles Ausburn (DD-294), a Clemson-class destroyer in the United States Navy following World War I
- Auburn (disambiguation)
