= Mr. Hiccup =

1983 animated series

- Created by: Piero Angela and Bruno Bozzetto
- Opening theme: Mr. Hiccup Always Has the Hiccups
- Country of origin: Italy
- No. of episodes: 39

Production
- Running time: 3 minutes (approx.)

Original release
- Release: 1983 – 1996

Mr. Hiccup is an animated series created by Italtoons Corporation in 1983. The character and initial shorts were initially created by Piero Angela and Bruno Bozzetto and developed into 39 three-minute episodes and several dozen shorts.

== Plot ==
The series focuses on the life of Mr. Hiccup, who is a little man with a normal life, a normal job, a normal home, and one not-so-normal problem: chronic hiccups.
