= Osborne House (disambiguation) =

Osborne House may refer to:

== Australia ==
- Osborne House (Geelong), a historic building built in 1858, located in North Geelong, Victoria
- Osborne House, Millers Point, a heritage-listed house in Sydney, New South Wales

== United Kingdom ==
- Osborne House, a former royal residence in East Cowes, Isle of Wight
- Osborne House, Cheadle, a former town hall in Staffordshire
- Osborne House School, a former school (c.1850–1940s) in Romsey, Hampshire

== United States ==
- Edmund B. Osborne House, a historic residence located in Red Oak, Iowa
- Jessie Osborne House, near Jerome, Idaho, listed on the National Register of Historic Places in 1983
- John Osborne House, a historic house at 909 King's Highway West in Fairfield, Connecticut
- Osborne House (Victor, New York), a historic home located at Victor in Ontario County, New York
- Prince Osborne House, a historic First Period house at 273 Maple Street in Danvers, Massachusetts

== See also ==
- Osborn House, a historic house at 456 Rock Street in Fall River, Massachusetts
- Bowers–Livingston–Osborn House, a historic house in Parsippany, New Jersey
