= Osbourne =

Osbourne may refer to:

- Osbourne (name), including a list of people with the name
- The Osbournes, a reality television program featuring Ozzy Osbourne and family
- Osbournes Reloaded, a variety television program also featuring the Osbourne family
- Osbourne Canyon Formation, a geologic formation in California

== See also ==
- Osborn (disambiguation)
- Osborne (disambiguation)
- Osbourn (disambiguation)
- Osbern (disambiguation)
