= Osborn =

Osborn may refer to:

- Osborn (surname)
- Osborn Engineering, American architectural and engineering firm
- Osborn Engineering Company, British motorcycle manufacturer
- Osborn wave, an abnormal electrocardiogram finding

== Places in the United States ==
- Osborn, Maine
- Osborn, Michigan
- Osborn, Missouri
- Osborn, Montana
- Osborn, Ohio
- Osborn, Wisconsin
- Osborn Correctional Institution, Somers, Connecticut

== See also ==
- Osborne (disambiguation)
- Osbourn (disambiguation)
- Osbourne (disambiguation)
