= Mzungu Kichaa =

Espen Sørensen
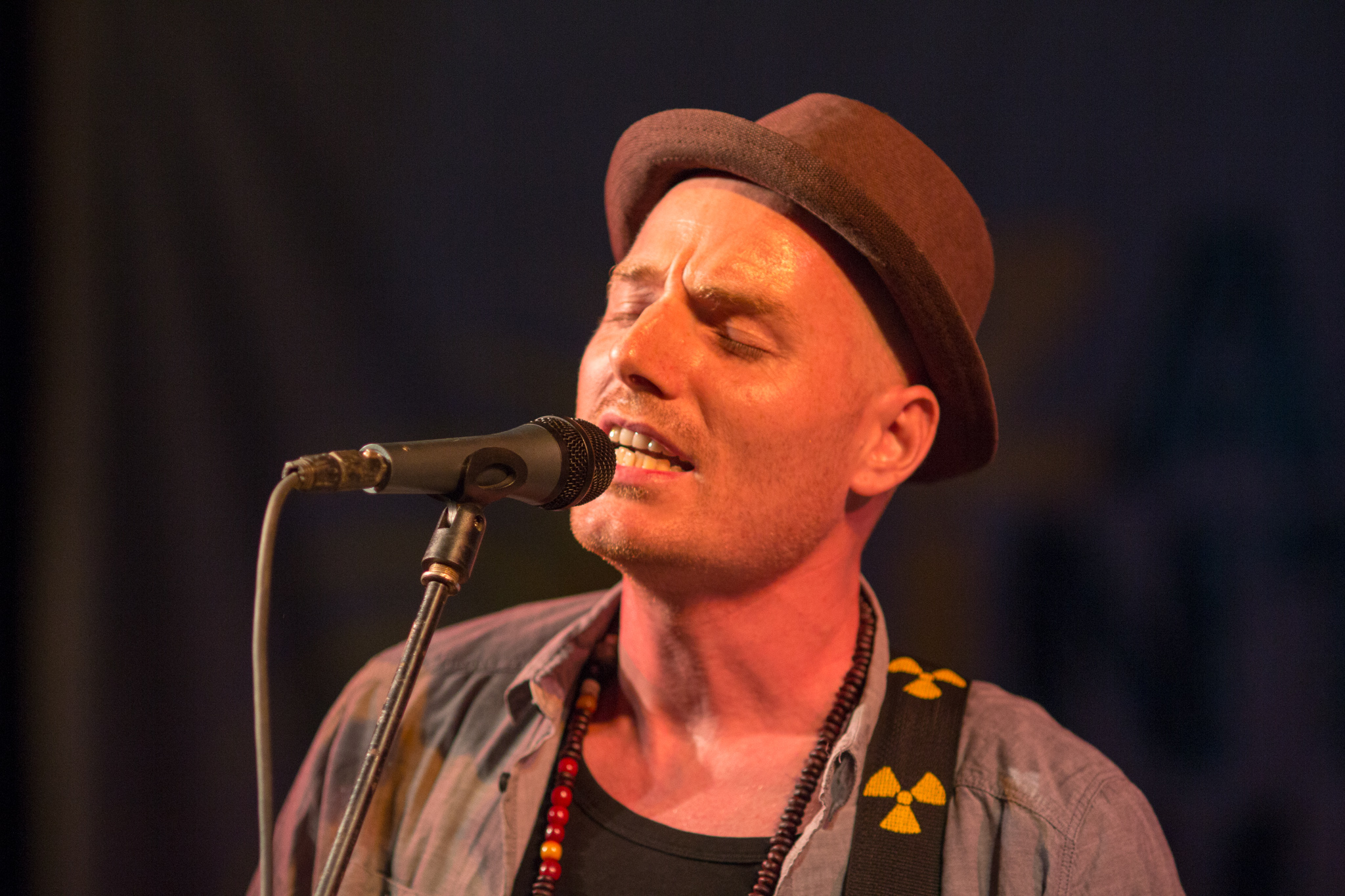

Background information
- Birth name: Espen Sørensen
- Also known as: Mzungu Kichaa
- Born: 5 August 1980; Denmark
- Genres: Bongo Flava
- Years active: 1996-present

Espen Sørensen, known professionally as Mzungu Kichaa, is a Danish singer and musician. He was born in Denmark, but grew up in Tanzania, where his parents worked in the field of Development Cooperation. They went there when he was six years old. In Tanzania, he learned to speak Swahili fluently, and later on, he got involved in music and particularly in the production of Bongo Flava at Bongo Records. The latest outcome of his interest in East African music is his first solo album "Tuko Pamoja".

== Music career ==
In late 1990s, Mzungu Kichaa was among the first artists that started recording at Bongo Records in Dar Es Salaam, among them Juma Nature, TID, Mangwair, Ferooz, Professor Jay and Mwasiti. During that time, he got his artist's name Mzungu Kichaa, what can be translated as "Crazy white man". He didn't appear among the upcoming artists in Tanzania at that time, but did some choruses on several songs around 2001. Later on, he went to the UK to do his undergraduate studies in Music and Cultural Anthropology. After finishing his MA in African Studies, he stepped back to his music career, founding a group called Effigong in 2006. In 2008, he decided to continue as a solo artist and released his first record in 2009 on the independent label Caravan Records. The album was first released in East Africa, but after getting airplay on several European radio stations, it was also released in Europe in May 2009. The songs of the album, like "Jitolee" (featuring Professor Jay) or "Wajanja" are all in Swahili, the language mainly used in Tanzanian Bongo Flava. The lyrics of the songs focus on social problems in Tanzania, like poverty. Sørensen did a three-weeks promotion tour for his album in February 2009, mainly in Tanzania and Kenya, but he also performed in Denmark with the backing group ReCulture.

The single Jitolee has been a hit in Tanzania and Kenya.

== Discography ==
* Tuko Pamoja (2009)

- Hustle (EP, 2012)
- Relax (EP, 2014)
- Huyu Nani (Album, 2014)
