= Hiccup =

Involuntary contraction of the diaphragm

- Other names: Singultus, hiccough, synchronous diaphragmatic flutter (SDF)
- Pronunciation: /ˈhɪkəp, -ʌp/ HIK-əp, -up
- Specialty: Otorhinolaryngology

A hiccup (scientific name singultus, from Latin for 'sob, hiccup'; also spelled hiccough) is an involuntary contraction (myoclonic jerk) of the diaphragm that may repeat several times per minute. The hiccup is an involuntary action involving a reflex arc. Once triggered, the reflex causes a contraction of the diaphragm followed by the closure of the glottis, the space between the vocal cords, in about 35 milliseconds, which results in the "hic" sound.

Hiccups may occur individually or in bouts. The rhythm of the hiccup, or the time between hiccups, tends to be relatively constant. A bout of hiccups generally resolves itself without intervention, although many home remedies are often used to attempt to shorten the duration. Medical treatment is occasionally necessary in cases of chronic hiccups.

== Incidence ==
Hiccups affect people of all ages, even being observed in utero. They become less frequent with advancing age. Intractable hiccups, lasting more than a month, are more common in adults. While males and females are affected equally often, men are more likely to develop protracted and intractable hiccups.

Along with humans, hiccups have been studied and observed in cats, rats, rabbits, dogs, and horses.

== Signs and symptoms ==
Hiccup sound
The sound of a human hiccup

A hiccup consists of a single or a series of breathing diaphragm spasms, of variable spacing and duration, and a brief (less than one half second), unexpected, shoulder, abdomen, throat, or full body tremor.

== Causes ==
=== Pathophysiological causes ===
- Food stuck in the esophagus
- Swallowing air excessively
- Gastroesophageal reflux
- Hiatal hernia
- Rapid eating
- Alcohol or carbonated beverages
- Spicy foods
- Opiate drug use
- Laughing vigorously or for a long time

Several human conditions can trigger hiccups (such as diabetes mellitus or uraemia). In rare cases, they can be a sign of serious medical problems such as myocardial infarction.

==== Pre-phrenic nucleus irritation of medulla ====
- Kidney failure

==== CNS disorders ====
- Stroke
- Multiple sclerosis
- Meningitis

==== Nerve damage ====
- Damage to the vagus nerve after surgery

==== Other known associations ====
- Although no clear pathophysiological mechanism has been described, hiccups is known to have been the initial symptom of Plasmodium vivax malaria in at least one documented case.
- Consumption or injection of corticosteroids, most commonly dexamethasone.

=== Evolutionary theories ===
==== The burping reflex hypothesis ====
A leading hypothesis is that hiccups evolved to facilitate greater milk consumption in young mammals. The coordination of breathing and swallowing during suckling is complicated. Some air inevitably enters the stomach, occupying space that could otherwise be optimally used for calorie-rich milk.

The hypothesis suggests that the presence of an air bubble in the stomach stimulates the sensory (afferent) part of the reflex in the through receptors in the stomach, esophagus, and along the underside of the diaphragm. This triggers the active (efferent) part of the hiccup reflex process in the 'hiccup center' part of the brain, sharply contracting the muscles of breathing and relaxing the muscles of the esophagus, then closing the vocal cords to prevent air from entering the lungs. This creates suction in the chest, pulling air from the stomach up into the esophagus. As the respiratory muscles relax, the air is expelled through the mouth, effectively "burping" the animal.

There are a number of characteristics of hiccups that support this theory. The burping of a suckling infant may increase its capacity for milk, bringing a significant survival advantage. There is a strong tendency for infants to get hiccups, and although the reflex persists throughout life, it decreases in frequency with age. The location of the sensory nerves that trigger the reflex suggests it is a response to a condition in the stomach. The component of the reflex that suppresses peristalsis in the esophagus while the airway is being actively blocked suggests the esophagus is involved. Additionally, hiccups are only described in mammals, the group of animals that share the trait of suckling their young.

==== Phylogenetic hypothesis ====
It has been proposed that the hiccup is an evolutionary remnant of earlier amphibian respiration. Amphibians such as tadpoles gulp air and water across their gills via a rather simple motor reflex akin to mammalian hiccuping. The motor pathways that enable hiccuping form early during fetal development, before the motor pathways that enable normal lung ventilation form. Thus, the hiccup is evolutionarily antecedent to modern lung respiration.

Additionally, hiccups and amphibian gulping are inhibited by elevated CO_{2} and may be stopped by GABA_{B} receptor agonists, illustrating a possible shared physiology and evolutionary heritage. These proposals may explain why premature infants spend 2.5% of their time hiccuping, possibly gulping like amphibians, as their lungs are not yet fully formed.

== Duration ==
Episodes of hiccups usually last under 30 minutes. Prolonged attacks, while rare, can be serious. Root causes of prolonged hiccups episodes are difficult to diagnose. Such attacks can cause significant morbidity and even death. An episode lasting more than a few minutes is termed a bout; a bout of over 48 hours is termed persistent or protracted. Hiccups lasting longer than a month are termed intractable. In many cases, only a single hemidiaphragm, usually the left one, is affected, although both may be involved.

== Treatment ==
Hiccups are normally waited out, as fits will usually pass quickly. Folk cures for hiccups are common and varied. Hiccups are treated medically only in severe and persistent (termed "intractable") cases.

Numerous medical remedies exist, but no particular treatment is known to be especially effective, generally because of a lack of high-quality evidence.

A vagus nerve stimulator has been used with an intractable case of hiccups. "It sends rhythmic bursts of electricity to the brain by way of the vagus nerve, which passes through the neck. The Food and Drug Administration approved the vagus nerve stimulator in 1997 as a way to control seizures in some patients with epilepsy."

In one person, persistent digital rectal massage coincided with terminating intractable hiccups.

=== Folk remedies ===
There are many folk remedies for hiccups, including headstanding, drinking a glass of water upside-down, being frightened by someone, breathing into a bag, eating a large spoonful of peanut butter, and placing sugar on or under the tongue.

Acupressure, either through actual function or placebo effect, may cure hiccups in some people. For example, one technique is to relax the chest and shoulders and find the deepest points of the indentations directly below the protrusions of the collarbones. The index or middle fingers are inserted into the indents and pressed firmly for sixty seconds, as long, deep breaths are taken.

A simple treatment involves increasing the partial pressure of CO_{2} and inhibiting diaphragm activity by holding one's breath or rebreathing into a paper bag. Other potential remedies suggested by NHS Choices include pulling the knees up to the chest and leaning forward, sipping ice-cold water and swallowing some granulated sugar.

A breathing exercise called supra-supramaximal inspiration (SSMI) has been shown to stop persistent hiccups. It combines the three principles of hypercapnia, diaphragm immobilization, and positive airway pressure. First, the subject must exhale completely, then take a deep breath. Then, they must hold their breath for ten seconds. After ten seconds, they must take another small breath without exhaling, then hold their breath for five seconds. Again, without exhaling, they must take another small breath and hold their breath for five seconds. Upon exhaling, the hiccups should be gone.

Drinking through a straw with the ears plugged is a folk remedy that can be successful. In 2021, a scientific tool with a similar basis was tested on 249 hiccups subjects; the results were published in the Journal of the American Medical Association (JAMA). This device is named FISST (Forced Inspiratory Suction and Swallow Tool) and branded as "HiccAway". This study supports the use of FISST as an option to stop transient hiccups, with more than 90% of participants reporting better results than home remedies. A non-commercial resource describing a similar suction-based technique using a regular straw and water bottle has also been published online. HiccAway stops hiccups by forceful suction that is being generated by diaphragm contraction (phrenic nerve activity), followed by swallowing the water, which requires epiglottis closure.

== Society and culture ==
The word hiccup itself was created through imitation. The alternative spelling of hiccough resulted from the association with the word cough.

- American Charles Osborne (1893/1894–1991) had hiccups for 68 years, from 1922 to 1990, and was entered in the Guinness World Records as the man with the longest attack of hiccups, an estimated 430 million hiccups.
- In 2007, Florida teenager Jennifer Mee gained media fame for hiccuping around 50 times per minute for more than five weeks.
- British singer Christopher Sands hiccupped an estimated 10 million times in 27 months from February 2007 to May 2009. His condition, which meant that he could hardly eat or sleep, was eventually discovered to be caused by a tumor on his brain stem pushing on nerves, causing him to hiccup every two seconds, 12 hours a day. His hiccups stopped in 2009 following surgery.

In Baltic, German, Hungarian, Indian, Romanian, Slavic, Turkish, Greek and Albanian tradition, as well as among some tribes in Kenya, for example in the folklore of the Luo people, it is said that hiccups occur when the person experiencing them is being talked about by someone not present.

== See also ==
- Choking
- Cough
- Getting the wind knocked out of you
- Mr. Hiccup
- Sneeze
- Thumps, a more serious form of hiccups found in equines
- Vocal hiccup
- Yawn
