= William Evelyn Osborn =

British painter (1868–1906)

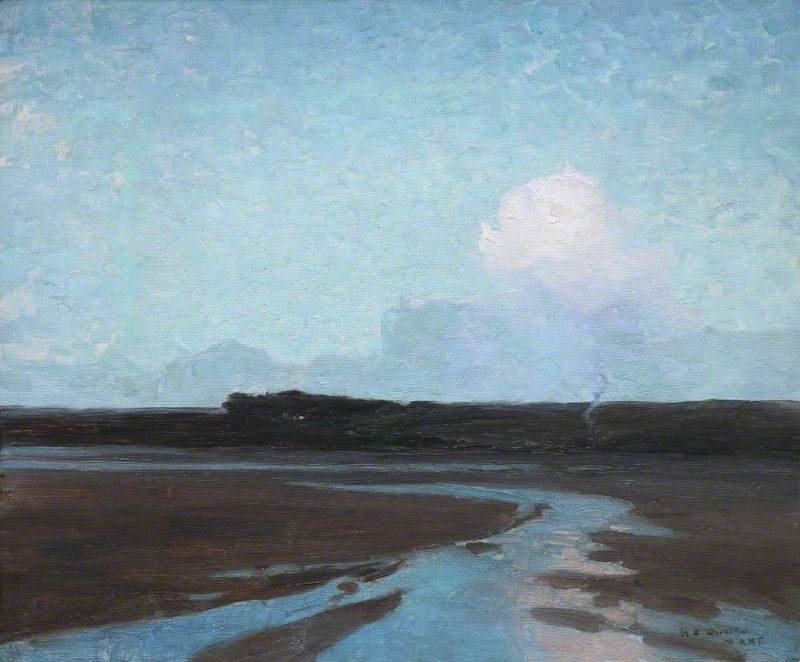
Hayle Flats by William E. Osborn

William Evelyn Osborn (1868–1906) was a British artist.

The Tate Gallery has two of his works in its permanent collection: Beach at Dusk, St Ives Harbour c.1895, and Royal Avenue, Chelsea c.1900.
