= Ansger de Montaigu =

Anglo-Norman nobleman

Ansger or Ansgar (Old Norse Ásgeirr; fl. 1086) of Montacute was one of the Devon Domesday Book tenants-in-chief of King William the Conqueror.

Ansgar is called in Domesday Book "Ansger de Montagud" and also "Ansgar of Senarpont", which manor is situated in the French department of Somme.

The Domesday Book of 1086 lists "Ansger de Montagud" as holding seven manors in Devonshire from the king. These were:

- Stafford (in the parish of Dolton);
- one virgate of land in Great Torrington;
- Brimblecombe;
- Cheldon;
- Muxbere;
- Sutton;
- Dolton.

His holdings later became the property of the feudal barony of Gloucester, the Devonshire caput of which was Winkleigh.

He is apparently the same man as "Ansgar the Breton" who held other estates in Devon and Somerset from Robert, Count of Mortain, half-brother of William the Conqueror, in Devon namely:

- Buckland Brewer,
- East Putford,
- Bulkworthy ,
- Smytham. Staford was in the historic Hundred of North Tawton.
