= Laura Freele Osborn =

American suffragist and education reformer

- Portrait of Osborn by Leon Makielski
- Born: 1866; Huntington, Indiana
- Died: 1955 (aged 88–89)
- Occupations: Educator, social reformer
- Spouse: Francis C. Osborn (m. 1891)

Laura Freele Osborn (1866–1955) was an American suffragist, campaigner for school reform, and long-serving member of the School Board for Detroit Public Schools in Detroit, Michigan. Active during the first half of the 20th century, she was the first woman elected to citywide office in Detroit and served on the school board for 38 years.

== Early life ==
Osborn was born and raised in Huntington, Indiana, where she worked as a schoolteacher until her marriage in 1891 to Francis C. Osborn, a Detroit businessman and inventor.

== Career ==
Osborn was a prominent advocate of non-partisan school boards in Michigan. She contributed to legislation passed in 1913 to that effect and later lobbied then-Governor Woodbridge N. Ferris to support further reform.

She was first elected to the Detroit School Board in 1917, campaigning on a platform of reform, and became the first woman elected to citywide office in Detroit. She served on the board for 38 years until her death in 1955, during which time she was elected board president on seven occasions. Osborn also contributed to the development of Wayne State University in the mid-1930s.

She is also credited with mobilising women into the causes of school reform and temperance, and with having "broken the prejudice against women officeholders in Detroit". She ran unsuccessfully for Detroit City Council on two occasions.

== Legacy ==
- Osborn High School in Detroit, built in the late 1950s, was named in her honour.
- She was inducted into the Michigan Women's Hall of Fame in 1995.
