= Osbourne (name) =

Osbourne is a name that is a variant of Osborne.

Notable people with the name include:

== Surname ==
- Glen Osbourne (born 1971), American professional wrestler
- Ida Elizabeth Osbourne (1916–2014), Australian actor and broadcaster
- Isaac Osbourne (born 1986), English footballer
- Isaiah Osbourne (born 1987), English footballer
- Isobel Osbourne (1858–1953), Robert Louis Stevenson's step-daughter and sister of Lloyd Osbourne
- Joey Osbourne, American musician
- Johnny Osbourne (born 1948), Jamaican reggae and dancehall singer in the late 1970s and mid-1980s
- Lloyd Osbourne (1868–1947), American novelist
- Ozzy Osbourne (1948–2025), British singer
  - Sharon Osbourne (born 1952), British TV personality and wife of Ozzy Osbourne
  - Aimee Osbourne (born 1983), British model, daughter of Ozzy Osbourne
  - Kelly Osbourne (born 1984), British singer, daughter of Ozzy Osbourne
  - Jack Osbourne (born 1985), British son of Ozzy Osbourne

== Given name ==
- Osbourne Fleming (born 1940), Anguillian politician
- Osbourne Moxey (born 1978), Bahamian long jumper
- Osbourne Ruddock (1941-1989), Jamaican sound engineer

== Fictional characters ==
- Alex 'Star-Burns' Osbourne, character from Community
- Daniel Osbourne (Coronation Street)
- Daniel 'Oz' Osbourne, character in the Buffy the Vampire Slayer television series
- Denise Osbourne, character from Coronation Street
