= Osborne Park (Willoughby, Ohio) =

Coordinates: 41.700°N 81.395°W

- Interactive map of Osborne Park
- Location: Lake Erie, Ohio
- Nearest city: Willoughby, Ohio

Osborne Park is a lakefront park located on the shore of Lake Erie in Willoughby, Ohio. It is the largest lakefront park in Willoughby and the only one with a swimming pool. The pool features some of the tallest water slides in Lake County, Ohio. In addition to the swimming pool, Osborne Park boasts a baseball field, football field complete with goalposts, tennis courts, a basketball court, a sand volleyball court, soccer field, paved walking path, 2 pavilions, 2 playgrounds, swinging benches on the lakefront and many charcoal burning grills for cooking.
