= Espen Selvik =

Norwegian musician, conductor, composer & writer

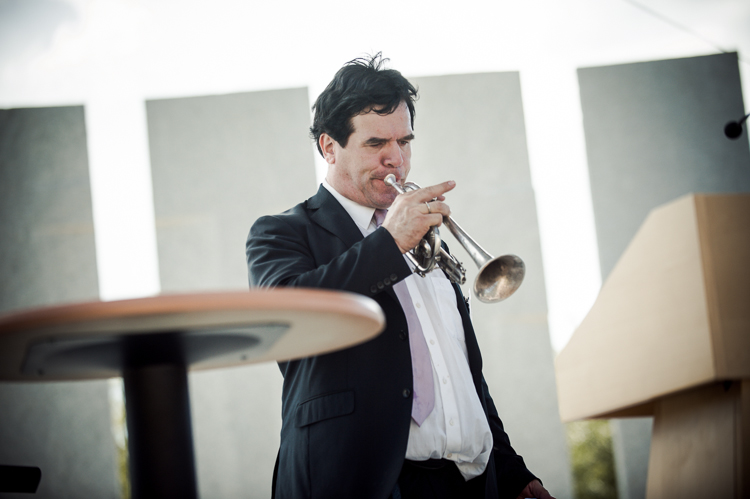
- Selvik in 2014
- Born: Norway
- Occupations: Musician; conductor; composer; writer; director
- Employer: Bergens Tidende
- Musical career
- Instrument: Lur

Espen Selvik is a Norwegian musician, conductor, composer, music reviewer for Bergens Tidende, advisor of the Reksten Foundation and director of Guatinget. He is also honorary consul of the republic of Lithuania. Selvik has composed five symphonies and two oratorios.

He composed and performed a special piece for the lur (a wooden shepherd's horn), choir and orchestra, marking the visit of Norway's then–Crown Prince Haakon to Orkney in April 2014. He performed on a lur originally given to Norway's King Olav V and donated by his son Harold V to raise funds for a community centre on Orkney.

== Compositions ==
- 1974: Symphony No. 1
- 1978: Symphony No. 2
- 1985: Symphony No. 3
- 1986: Synergy for large orchestra
- 2001: The Spirit and the Song (oratorio)
- 2002: Symphony No. 4, "Viking"
- 2003: Abraham (oratorio)
- 2005: Symphony No. 5
