= Espen Hagh =

Norwegian footballer (born 1974)

Personal information
- Date of birth: 10 July 1974 (age 52)
- Position: Midfielder

Youth career
- Mo
- Molde

Senior career*
Years	Team	Apps	(Gls)
–1994	Mo		
1995–1996	Kongsvinger	15	(0)
1996	Lyn	1	(0)
1997	Drøbak-Frogn	20	(0)
1998	Mo		
- Hertha BSC II
- SC Siemensstadt
2002–2008	Mo		

International career
1993	Norway under-20	2	(0)
- * Club domestic league appearances and goals

Espen Hagh (born 10 July 1974) is a retired Norwegian football midfielder.

He is a son of Tore Hagh. He started his youth career in Mo IL and progressed into the first team. In 1995 he joined Kongsvinger. He was noted as having the team's highest O_{2} uptake of 76.

He did not fully break into the first team, and played only one Norwegian Premier League game in 1996. After an unsuccessful autumn loan to Lyn he joined Drøbak-Frogn ahead of the 1997 season. Here he played 20 games in the 1997 Norwegian First Division.

In 1998 he commenced physiotherapy studies in Berlin. He joined Hertha BSC II and later played for SC Siemensstadt. In 2002 he rejoined Mo IL, retiring after the 2008 season.
