= Kong Asgers Høj =

Kong Asgers Hoj
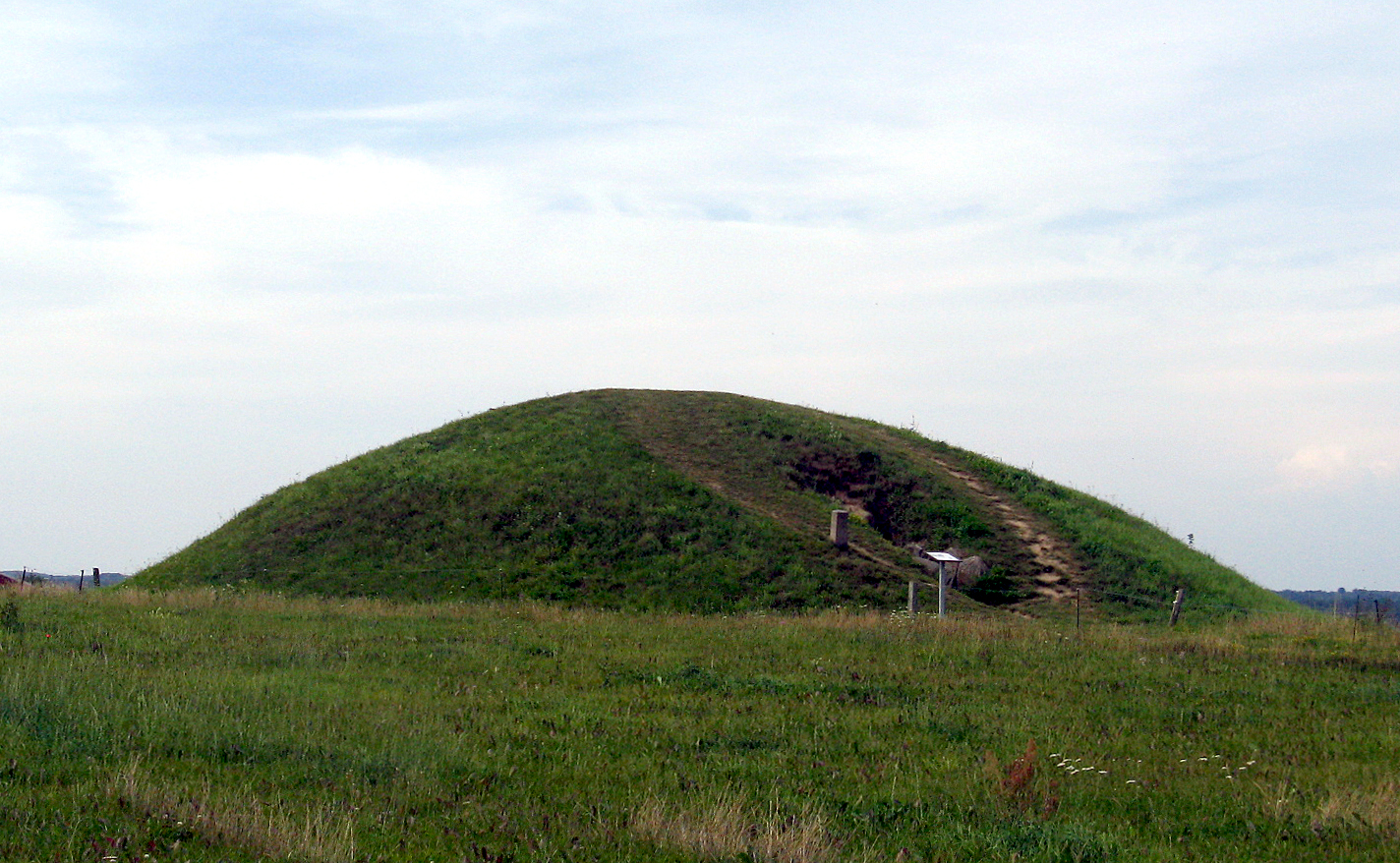
- The passage grave in 2009
- Interactive map of Kong Asgers Hoj
- 54.95717°N 12.14031°E
- Type: Passage grave
- Location: Stege, Zealand, Denmark

History
- Built: c. 3200 BC

Site notes
- Material: Dirt

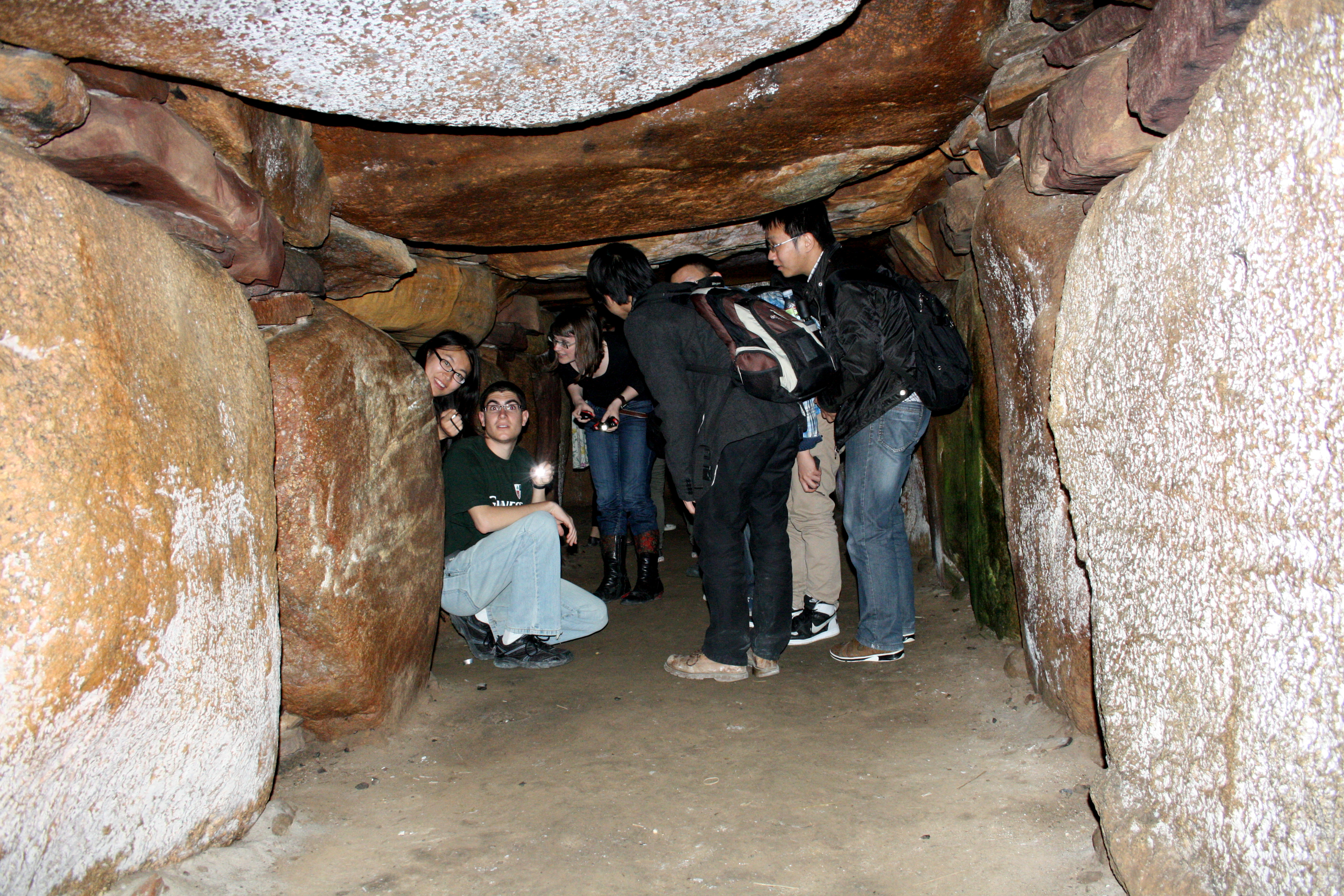
Interior

Kong Asgers Høj is a large passage grave on the island of Møn in Denmark.

The megalithic structure dated to Neolithic Funnel Beaker culture. The grave consists of a chamber (10 m long by 2 m wide) with a long passage (7.5 m long). This type of graves is found primarily in Denmark, Germany and Scandinavia, and occasionally in France and the Netherlands.

Study of King Asger Høj began in 1839, when the Danish merchant Gustav Hage tried to find a treasure but found it empty. The grave is structurally untouched since ancient times, but may have been cleared then. It was used as Secondary burial for Corded Ware culture period.
