= Ascari (surname) =

Ascari is an Italian surname, with a high number of occurrences in Emilia-Romagna and Lombardia. In addition there is a high number of occurrences of the name in Brazil.

== Origin and meaning ==
The name Ascari is derived from the Italian form of the Germanic name Ansgar - Anscario. Ansgar (Latinized Ansgarius; Old Norse Ásgeirr) is a Germanic given name, composed of the elements ans "god", and gar "spear", thus meaning "spear of god".

== People ==
- Antonio Ascari (1888–1925), Italian racing driver
- Alberto Ascari (1918–1955), Italian racing driver
- Stefania Ascari (born 1980), Italian politician
- Tonino Ascari (1942–2008), Italian racing driver
