= Usborne =

Usborne is a variant of the name Osborne. It may refer to:

== People ==
- Cecil Vivian Usborne (1880–1951), British Royal Navy vice-admiral, father of Henry Usborne
- Henry Usborne (1909–1996), British MP and peace activist, founder of the All-Party Group for World Government
- Jonty Usborne (born 1990), British radio engineer
- Peter Usborne (1937–2023), British publisher and founder of Usborne Books
- Richard Usborne (1910–2006), British journalist and author

== Other uses ==
- Mount Usborne, a mountain on East Falkland Island
- Rural Municipality of Usborne No. 310, Saskatchewan, Canada
- Usborne Publishing, a children's books publisher based in the UK

== See also ==
- Osborne (disambiguation)
