= Francis C. Osborn Sr. =

Francis Conrad Osborn Sr. (December 10, 1856 – May 25, 1927) was a teacher, businessman and inventor. He held about 50 patents for cash register designs, springless scales, and other devices.

== Early life and education ==
Son of Ozias and Mary C. (Herbener) Osborn, he was born and raised in Bridgeport, New York. He was educated in local schools and Cazenovia Seminary. Osborn taught in public schools of Fayetteville, New York in 1880-1882 before enrolling at Syracuse University, where he graduated with honors in 1885. He was a member of Delta Upsilon fraternity.

== Career ==
After working for several years for Ginn & Co., he settled in Detroit, Michigan in 1889 to work on a design for a cash register. In 1891 he married Laura A. Freele. They had three children.

Osborn organized several companies in Detroit, including: the Osborn Cash Register Co., Ltd. in 1896, which he sold out to the National Cash Register Co. in 1900; the Standard Computing Scale Co., Ltd. in 1889, which produced devices he designed; the Perfection Hand Stamp Company in 1900, which produced cancellation devices used in post offices in the US and Canada; and the F.C. Osborn Co., which produced machinery for making cardboard tubing and scales.

== Some patents applied for and issued ==
All patents in the United States, except where noted:

- Cash register and indicator; Patent no.: 455111; Filing date: Dec. 6, 1889; Issue date: Jun. 30, 1891
- Power transmitter; Patent no.: 472222; Filing date: Nov. 14, 1891; Issue date: Apr. 5, 1892
- Power transmitter; Patent no.: 472223; Filing date: Nov. 14, 1891; Issue date: Apr. 5, 1892
- Calculating machine; Patent no.: 484814; Filing date: Jun. 18, 1891; Issue date: Oct. 25, 1892
- Cash register; Patent no.: 491022; Filing date: Jun. 11, 1891; Issue date: Jan. 31, 1893
- Cash register; Patent no.: 615409; Filing date: Aug. 13, 1897; Issue date: Dec. 6, 1898
- Letter-canceling machine; Patent no.: 645711; Filing date: Feb. 5, 1900; Issue date: Mar. 20, 1900
- Letter mail cancelling machine; Canada Patent #67,988; Filing date: 1 March 1900; Issue date: 5 July 1900
- Double saw for cutting button blanks; Patent no.: 650189; Filing date: Jun. 29, 1895; Issue date: May 22, 1900
- Computing scale; Patent no.: 698048; Filing date: Dec. 17, 1900; Issue date: Apr. 22, 1902
- Platform support for scales; Patent no.: 710003; Filing date: Dec. 17, 1900; Issue date: Sep. 30, 1902
- Tube-making machine; Patent no.: 710507; Filing date: Mar. 10, 1902; Issue date: Oct. 7, 1902
- Tube-making machine; Patent no.: 712954; Filing date: May 24, 1902; Issue date: Nov. 4, 1902
- Cash register; Patent no.: 715850; Filing date: Jan. 31, 1899; Issue date: Dec. 16, 1902
- Cash register; Patent no.: 723906; Filing date: May 27, 1899; Issue date: Mar. 31, 1903
- Air brake (with W.J Vaughn & E.C. van Husan) Patent no.: 755335; Filing date: Apr. 27, 1903; Issue date: Mar. 22, 1904
- Electric recorder; Patent no.: 767525; Filing date: Aug. 3, 1903; Issue date: Aug. 16, 1904
- Cash register; Patent no.: 773096; Filing date: Nov. 18, 1898; Issue date: Oct. 25, 1904
- Cash register; Patent no.: 786377; Filing date: Aug. 24, 1895; Issue date: Apr. 4, 1905
- Time clock for cash registers; Patent no.: 790654; Filing date: Aug. 20, 1900; Issue date: May 23, 1905
- Computing scale; Patent no.: 793606; Filing date: Jan. 19, 1905; Issue date: Jun. 27, 1905
- Crank-shaft; Patent no.: 805878; Filing date: Aug. 25, 1903; Issue date: Nov. 28, 1905
- Weighing scale; Patent no.: 806908; Filing date: Sep. 29, 1900; Issue date: Dec. 12, 1905
- Cash register; Patent no.: 817725; Filing date: Nov. 23, 1891; Issue date: Apr. 10, 1906
- Cash register; Patent no.: 824881; Filing date: Sep. 11, 1899; Issue date: Jul. 3, 1906
- Check printing cash register; Patent no.: 831626; Filing date: Oct. 22, 1901; Issue date: Sep. 25, 1906
- Check or ticket printing machine; Patent no.: 832271; Filing date: Nov. 8, 1901; Issue date: Oct. 2, 1906
- Cash register; Patent no.: 861312; Filing date: Oct. 23, 1901(?); Issue date: Jul. 30, 1907
- Cut-off mechanism for paper-tube machines; Patent no.: 863208; Filing date: Jul. 31, 1905; Issue date: Aug. 13, 1907
- Change making, indicating, and registering machine; Patent no.: 864185; Filing date: Dec. 10, 1891; Issue date: Aug. 27, 1907
- Cheese cutter; Patent no.: 879407; Filing date: Dec. 15, 1904; Issue date: Feb. 18, 1908
- Automatic weighing scale; Patent no.: 888646; Filing date: Jan. 21, 1907; Issue date: May 26, 1908
- Cash register; Patent no.: 926072; Filing date: Apr. 26, 1896?; Issue date: Jun. 22, 1909
- Paper tube machine; Patent no.: 945862; Filing date: Mar. 26, 1904; Issue date: Jan. 11, 1910
- Cash indicator and register; Patent no.: 982853; Filing date: May 2, 1896; Issue date: Jan. 31, 1911
- Container body forming machine; Patent no.: 996122; Filing date: Jan. 20, 1908; Issue date: Jun. 27, 1911
- Severing mechanisms for tube-making machines; Patent no.: 1006399; Filing date: Jun. 28, 1909; Issue date: Oct. 17, 1911
- Machine for making spirally wound tubes; Patent no.: 1006976; Filing date: Jun. 28, 1909; Issue date: Oct. 24, 1911
- Glue-applying machine for use in making spirally-wound tubes; Patent no.: 1018335; Filing date: Dec. 24, 1909; Issue date: Feb. 20, 1912
- Computing scale; Patent no.: 1062603; Filing date: Jul. 22, 1908; Issue date: May 27, 1913
- Puzzle; Patent no.: 1092165; Filing date: Jun. 25, 1910; Issue date: Apr. 7, 1914
- Cash register; Patent no.: 1119983; Filing date: Jan 23, 1895; Issue date: Dec 8, 1914
- Soap powder dispenser; Patent no.: 1226803; Filing date: Mar. 1, 1912; Issue date: May 3, 1917
- Scale; Patent no.: 1289885; Filing date: Feb. 17, 1913; Issue date: Dec. 31, 1918
- Container spout; Patent no.: 1375725; Filing date: Jun. 17, 1916; Issue date: Apr. 26, 1921
