= Jack Meanwell =

John Leonard Meanwell (1919–2005) was a Canadian artist and art teacher, known for his abstract expressionist landscapes and figurative work. He spent most of his career in Cincinnati, Ohio in the United States. He taught at the Art Academy of Cincinnati.

== Early life and education ==
He was born on February 6, 1919, in Winnipeg, Manitoba, Canada. Meanwell was the son of Leonard William Meanwell, an architect from Rugby, England who immigrated to Canada. His mother was Eleanor Jenkins Meanwell. The family relocated to Windsor, Ontario, Canada so that his father could find work in his field. His father accepted a position at the Albert Khan architecture firm in Detroit, Michigan, where he worked for the rest of his career. Jack shared his family's interest in art, and began figure drawing in high school. After graduating, he continued his studies in Detroit at Meinzinger Art School and the Society of Arts and Crafts. Meanwell sought technical training in commercial art because of the Great Depression.

== Artwork ==
An abstract expressionist, Meanwell strove to take the viewer beneath the surface of reality with his dramatic landscapes and figures painted in bright bold colors with energetic brush strokes. To achieve this he often used large brushes, oversized chalk, and pencils with blunt ends. Influences of J. M. W. Turner, Cezanne, Klee, and Sam Francis could be seen in his work.

== Career ==
During World War II he joined the Essex Scottish Infantry, but soon decided to join the Royal Canadian Air Force, where for four years he taught radar techniques to aircrews. In 1942, he married Marjory Wallingford of Ft. Mitchell, Kentucky. They had met during a vacation that she took to McGregor Bay, Ontario, Canada, where Meanwell was living. He worked on the McGregory Bay mail boat for his aunt who ran the post office and local store. In 1945 Meanwell began working on advertising art for Chrysler and Ford at the Greenhow Art Studios in Windsor, Canada. He found the technicality of commercial art stifling so he moved his family to the Ft. Mitchell, Kentucky in 1947. He then took over half of the Wallingford Coffee Company, which was owned by his father-in-law. Despite this new business venture, Meanwell continued to paint and began showing his work in 1969 in Cincinnati and New York City.

In 1972, he sold his share of the company so that he could focus on painting. He began teaching at the Art Academy of Cincinnati in 1976, and taught there for 25 years. In 1979 he accepted a teaching position at Northern Kentucky University. He also maintained an art studio at Elmwood Hall in Ludlow, Kentucky for 25 years. Most of Meanwell's summers were spent in McGregor Bay, Canada, where he found inspiration for his landscapes in the rugged wilderness. Eventually, he bought his own island in the area and returned yearly to his studio and home there.

As Meanwell continued his artistic career, his works were shown at almost 100 art exhibits and galleries in the region, beginning in 1969. He also had occasional exhibits in New York City, Chicago, Toronto, and Windsor. Meanwell exhibited at the Governors’ mansions in Ohio in 1974 and Kentucky in 1979. He was included in the Cincinnati Art Museum’s traveling exhibition, as well as its Invitational in 1981. Merida Galleries in Louisville hosted Meanwell in 1977, 1979, and 1982. One of his earliest one-man shows was in 1979 at Shaw Rimmington Gallery in Toronto. In February 1981 the Gallery at Ohio University, Landcaster, featured an exhibit of his watercolors. In 1983 he was one of fewer than 20 artists selected to show work in "Kentucky Revisited, 1983" in Frankfort. Closson's Gallery was Meanwell's primary representation during much of his career. Closson's opened "25 Years with Jack Meanwell" on February 3, 1996, in downtown Cincinnati. This exhibit was presented at Closson's Kenwood location on March 28, 1996.

In February 2001 Meanwell retired from the Art Academy of Cincinnati and was presented with an Honorary Doctorate of Fine Arts degree. The same year, the Mary Ran Gallery presented a major exhibit of forty of his strongest paintings at The Miami University Art Museum in Oxford, Ohio. The Ran Gallery presented another solo show of Meanwell's work In 2004, which was his last exhibit during his lifetime. The subjects of his work were the female figure, landscapes, and florals that were so representative of his abstract expressionist work during the last 25 years of his life. He died on June 7, 2005, in Cincinnati. His work has been acquired by several collections including the Cincinnati Art Museum, Cincinnati Bell, American Financial, Western and Southern Life, Marietta College, the University of Windsor.
