= Ansgar Beckermann =

German philosopher

Ansgar Beckermann (born 29 June 1945, in Hamburg) is a German philosopher who deals primarily with philosophy of mind and epistemology. He is professor for philosophy at the University of Bielefeld and was the president of the "Gesellschaft für analytische Philosophie" (German society for analytical philosophy). Beckermann is known for his arguments for physicalism and his discussion of the concept of emergence.

== Published works ==
=== English ===
- Emergence or Reduction? (with Hans Flohr and Jaegwon Kim), Berlin: Walter de Gruyter, 1992.
- Wittgenstein, Wittgensteinianism and the Contemporary Philosophy of Mind – Continuities and Changes. In: A. Coliva & E. Picardi (ed.): Wittgenstein today, 2004
- Self-Consciousness in Cognitive Systems. In: C. Kanzian. J. Quitterer and E. Runggaldier (ed.) Persons. An Interdisciplinary Approach, 2003
- "The perennial problem of the reductive explainability of phenomenal consciousness - C.D. Broad on the explanatory gap." In: Thomas Metzinger (ed.) Neural Correlates of Consciousness - Empirical and conceptual Questions, Cambridge, MIT-Press, 2000

=== German ===
- Klassiker der Philosophie heute (with Dominik Perler), Stuttgart: Reclam 2004.
- Analytische Einführung in die Philosophie des Geistes. Berlin: Walter de Gruyter, 1999.
- Einführung in die Logik. Berlin: Walter de Gruyter, 1997.
- Descartes' metaphysischer Beweis für den Dualismus, Freiburg: Verlag Karl Alber, 1986.
- Analytische Handlungstheorie. Bd. 2, Frankfurt: Suhrkamp, 1977.
- Gründe und Ursachen. Kronberg: Scriptor Verlag, 1977.
