= Kenneth O. Goehring =

American artist

Kenneth O. Goehring (January 8, 1919 – June 27, 2007) was an American abstract expressionist painter, who was born in Evansville, Wisconsin, and lived most of his life in Colorado Springs, Colorado. He signed his artwork Ken Goehring. His parents were Walter Goehring and Ruth (Rossman) Goehring of Wisconsin.

Goehring received his initial art training at the Meinzinger Art School in Detroit, Michigan. He served four years in the army during World War II. On December 1, 1945, he married Margretta M. MacNicol, and the couple moved from Detroit to Colorado Springs, Colorado, where Goehring studied art at the Colorado Springs Fine Arts Center from 1947 to 1950, beginning a 59-year residence in Colorado Springs. There he studied with Jean Charlot and Emerson Woelffer. An abstract expressionist, he developed a nonobjective style rooted in the landscapes and native cultures of the American West, producing works of art noted for their elegance, rich colors, fine finish and pervading air of mystery.

== Works ==
Goehring's paintings have appeared in over 100 exhibitions in 17 states, among them the Corcoran in Washington, D.C., the De Young Museum in San Francisco, Stanford University, the La Jolla Art Center, and the Denver Art Museum. The Pikes Peak Historical Society Museum (Florissant Schoolhouse Museum in Florissant, Colorado features a collection of over 50 miniature historic buildings by Goehring. In 1977 he won the Ranger Award from the American Academy of Design. His works are represented in the Smithsonian's American Artist Collection and he is listed in Who's Who in America.
