= Transition management =

Finance and business concept

Transition management, in the financial sense, is a service usually offered by sell side institutions to help buy side firms transition a portfolio of securities. Various events including acquisitions and management changes can cause the need for a portfolio to be transitioned. A typical example would be a mutual fund that has decided to merge two funds into one larger fund. In doing this, large quantities of securities will need to be bought and sold. Another frequent occurrence is a firm wanting to liquidate a large portfolio. The process of doing this can be very expensive.

A firm seeking to transition a portfolio will often look for an outside firm to perform the transition. Transition managers are generally able to transition the portfolio at a lower cost than a firm could achieve internally. Companies offering transition management can also add value by helping plan the transition, managing risk during the transition, and generating reports after the transition. Such companies are often referred to as transition companies.

Transition managers have a number of methods to help transition a portfolio. Usually they are directly connected to multiple markets or liquidity centers. Since they may be transitioning several different portfolios they can cross orders, reducing commission and exchange fees. Additionally, they may have specialist traders who handle illiquid securities.

A fiduciary-friendly recent trend has been to remove all conflicts of interest associated with transition management by "unbundling" advice from execution through the use of a transition or brokerage consultant. In this way, the adviser's sole possible interest is improving performance and lowering execution costs, rather than having a trader and adviser under the same roof.

While some brokers still try to sell transition management as a separate product, it is commonly offered on sell side desks as a part of regular trading services. These firms can often provide the same service for less in part due to modern trading algorithms and systems reporting.

== In business ==
In the business context, Transition Management refers to the structured coordination of change processes within an organisation, often during restructuring, mergers, or leadership shifts. It focuses on maintaining operational continuity, aligning stakeholders, and implementing new strategies or systems effectively.

In organisational practice, transition management emphasises clear communication, leadership alignment, and support mechanisms to minimise disruption and sustain productivity throughout periods of transformation.
