= Thomas Osborne =

Thomas Osborne, or variants thereof, may refer to:

== England ==
- Thomas Osborne, 1st Duke of Leeds (1632–1712), English Lord High Treasurer, Lord President of the Council and MP for York
- Thomas Osborne, 4th Duke of Leeds (1713–1789), English Justice in Eyre and Cofferer of the Household
- Thomas Osborne (publisher) (1704?–1767), English publisher and bookseller

== Ireland ==
- Sir Thomas Osborne, 5th Baronet (1639–1715), Irish baronet and landowner
- Sir Thomas Osborne, 9th Baronet (1757–1821), Irish baronet and politician

== United States ==
Listed chronologically by year of birth

- Thomas Burr Osborne (politician) (1798–1869), U.S. representative from Connecticut
- Thomas A. Osborne (1800–1877), American lawyer and politician in New York
- Thomas O. Osborn (1832–1904), American lawyer, soldier, and diplomat
- Thomas W. Osborn (1833–1898), U.S. senator from Florida
- Thomas A. Osborn (1836–1898), American lawyer, politician, and diplomat
- Thomas Mott Osborne (1859–1926), American prison reformer
- Thomas Burr Osborne (chemist) (1859–1929), American chemist, co-discoverer of Vitamin A
- T. L. Osborn (Tommy Lee Osborn), American Pentecostal televangelist, singer, author and teacher
- Tom Osborne (born 1937), American college football head coach (Nebraska), and member of Congress
- Tom Osborne (American football, born 1960), American football coach (Oregon)
- Tom Osborne (engineer), American engineer who created the Green Machine which led to the Hewlett-Packard 9100A

== Elsewhere ==
- Thomas Osborne (Australian journalist) (c. 1806–1853), Australian journalist and politician in the Victorian Legislative Council
- Tom Osborne (Canadian politician) (born 1964), Canadian politician in Newfoundland and Labrador
- Tom Osborne (rugby union) (born 1998), Australian rugby player

== See also ==
- Thomas Osborne Davis (Canadian politician) (1856–1917)
- Thomas Osborne Davis (Irish politician) (1814–1845)
