= Jon Espen Lohne =

Norwegian businessman

Jon Espen Lohne (born 1964), is a Norwegian businessperson in the media sector.

He is an economist by education, and worked in the Financial Supervisory Authority of Norway before being hired in A-pressen in 1995. The next year he was appointed assisting chief financial officer; in 1999 he was promoted to director of the television department. In 2001 he became a board member of the Norwegian News Agency, and in 2009 he succeeded Aslak Ona as chair. He is also a board member in TV 2.
