= Charles Osborne (farmer) =

American farmer

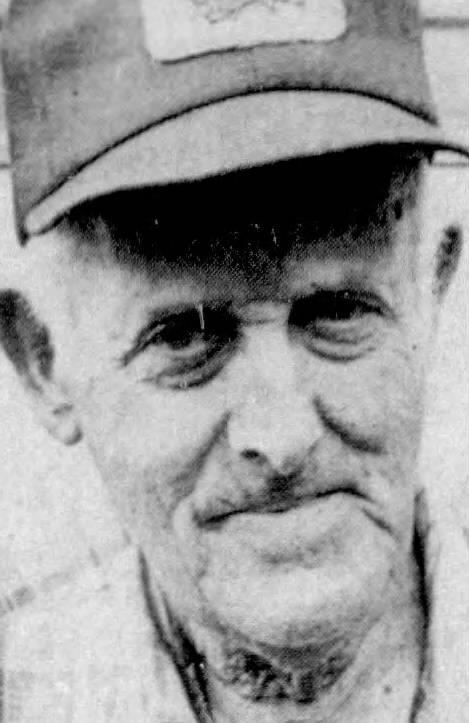
- Osborne in 1973
- Born: Charles Andrew Osborne c. 1893/1894; Missouri, U.S.
- Died: May 1, 1991 (aged 97–98); Sioux City, Iowa, U.S.
- Occupation: Farmer
- Spouse(s): Laura Marie Rowles (m. 1914, divorced) Lucille Louise Mundt (m. 1927; died. 1978)

Charles Andrew Osborne (c. 1893/1894 – May 1, 1991) was an American farmer. He gained national attention to the American public for hiccuping for over 68 years, estimating over 430 million hiccups throughout his life. Guinness World Records listed him as the man with the "longest attack of hiccups".

== Life and career ==
Osborne was born in Missouri in 1893 or 1894. At an early age, he began farming. He had worked in a farm in Nebraska and Iowa.

In 1922, Osborne began hiccuping on a farm near Union, Nebraska, after a 350-pound hog collapsed on top of him while he was preparing to slaughter the hog. It was speculated that either an abdomen muscle was pulled or a blood vessel in the brain burst and destroyed the part of the brainstem that inhibited the hiccups. He gained national attention in 1936, after he appeared on Ripley's Believe It or Not!'s radio program. He was listed in the Guinness World Records as the man with the "longest attack of hiccups". He retired from farming in 1961.

In 1982, Osborne guest-starred on the NBC television talk show The Tonight Show Starring Johnny Carson. He also appeared in a column of Dear Abby. His hiccuping lasted for over 68 years and stopped in 1990, estimating over 430 million hiccups throughout his life.

== Personal life and death ==
Osborne was married twice. He was first married to Laura Marie Rowles in 1914. Their marriage ended in divorce. He then married Lucille Louise Fredricka Mundt in 1927. Their marriage lasted until Mundt's death in 1978.

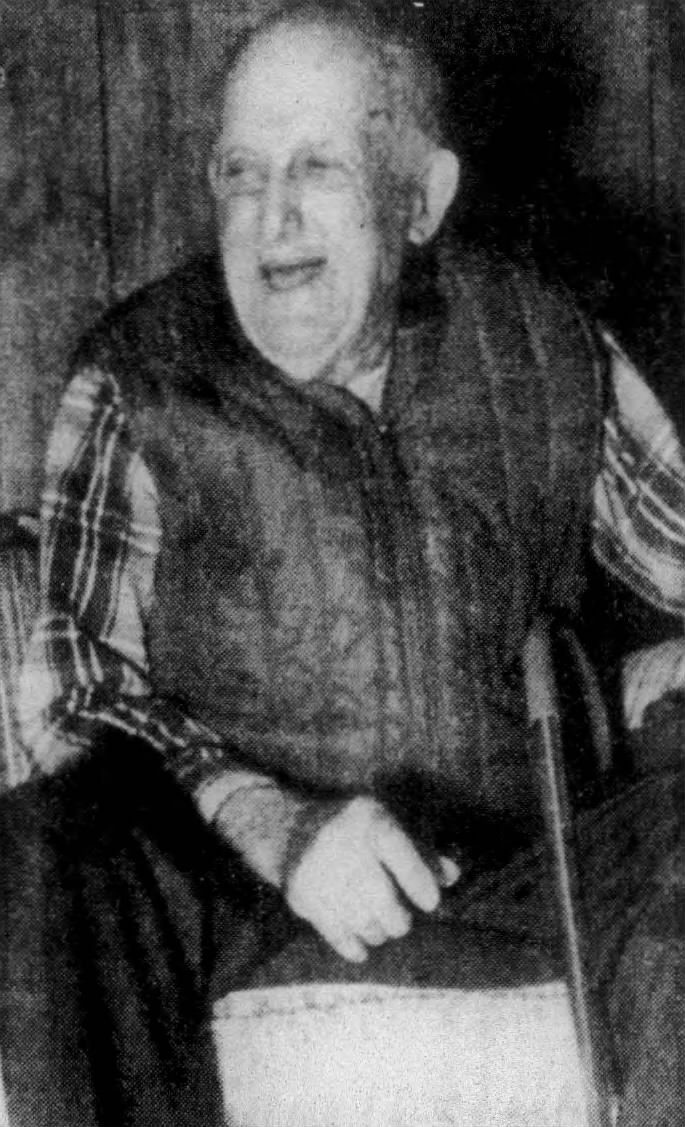
Osborne in 1988

Osborne died on May 1, 1991, at the Marian Health Center in Sioux City, Iowa.
