= Chuck Osborne =

American basketball player

Personal information
- Born: January 21, 1939 Johnson County, Kentucky, U.S.
- Died: April 17, 1979 (aged 40)
- Listed height: 6 ft 6 in (1.98 m)
- Listed weight: 210 lb (95 kg)

Career information
- High school: Flat Gap (Flat Gap, Kentucky)
- College: Western Kentucky (1958–1961)
- NBA draft: 1961: 3rd round, 28th overall pick
- Drafted by: Syracuse Nationals
- Position: Power forward
- Number: 23

Career history
- 1961: Syracuse Nationals
- Stats at NBA.com
- Stats at Basketball Reference

Charles H. Osborne (January 21, 1939 – April 17, 1979) was an American professional basketball player. He played college basketball for the Western Kentucky Hilltoppers and played in the National Basketball Association (NBA) for the Syracuse Nationals. In four career NBA games, he averaged 1.3 points, 2.3 rebounds and 0.3 assists.

Osborne was killed in an automobile accident on April 17, 1979.

== Career statistics ==
Legend
| GP | Games played | GS | Games started | MPG | Minutes per game |
| FG% | Field goal percentage | 3P% | 3-point field goal percentage | FT% | Free throw percentage |
| RPG | Rebounds per game | APG | Assists per game | SPG | Steals per game |
| BPG | Blocks per game | PPG | Points per game | **Bold** | Career high |

=== NBA ===
==== Regular season ====
| Year | Team | GP | MPG | FG% | FT% | RPG | APG | PPG |
|---|---|---|---|---|---|---|---|---|
| 1961–62 | Syracuse | 4 | 5.3 | .125 | .750 | 2.3 | .3 | 1.3 |
