= Ernest Osborne (footballer) =

English footballer (1899–1958)

Personal information
- Full name: Ernest Osborne
- Date of birth: 12 May 1899
- Place of birth: Wolverhampton, England
- Date of death: 1958 (aged 58–59)
- Position: Winger

Senior career*
Years	Team	Apps	(Gls)
1922–1923	Evesham Town		
1923–1926	Crystal Palace	30	(3)
1926–1927	Lincoln City	0	(0)
Total		30	(3)
- * Club domestic league appearances and goals

Ernest Osborne (12 May 1899 – 1958) was an English footballer who played in the Football League for Crystal Palace.
