= B. Espen Eckbo =

Norwegian-American economist (born 1952)

- Born: June 2, 1952 (age 74)

Academic background
- Education: University of Rochester Norwegian School of Economics

B. Espen Eckbo is a Norwegian-American economist, currently the Tuck Centennial Professor at Dartmouth College.
