= Ernest Osborne (cricketer) =

Australian cricketer

Personal information
- Full name: Ernest Charles Osborne
- Born: 24 April 1873; Elsternwick, Victoria, Australia
- Died: 25 March 1926 (aged 52); Cardinia, Victoria, Australia
- Batting: Unknown
- Bowling: Unknown-arm fast-medium

Domestic team information
- Years: Team
- 1894: Cambridge University

Career statistics
Competition	First-class
Matches	3
Runs scored	6
Batting average	1.20
100s/50s	–/–
Top score	5
Balls bowled	455
Wickets	5
Bowling average	45.50
5 wickets in innings	–
10 wickets in match	–
Best bowling	3/46
Catches/stumpings	1/–
- Source: Cricinfo, 15 June 2022

Ernest Charles Osborne (24 April 1873 – 25 March 1926) was an Australian cricketer who played first-class cricket for Cambridge University in three matches in 1894. He was born at Elsternwick, Victoria and died at Cardinia, Victoria.

Osborne was educated at the Melbourne Church of England Grammar School and at Jesus College, Cambridge.

Before arriving in England in 1891, he had played some cricket for Essendon Cricket Club in the precursor to the Victorian Premier Cricket competition as a lower-middle-order batsman and a fast-medium bowler – it is not known whether he was right- or left-handed. His cricket at Cambridge was limited to three games within 10 days in May 1894: he made little impact with the ball, and none at all as a batsman, and did not survive in the team long enough to win a Blue.

Osborne graduated from Cambridge University with both Bachelor of Arts and Bachelor of Laws degrees in 1894 and went back to Australia.

He returned to Victoria club cricket with the Melbourne University team through to 1902.

He qualified as a solicitor in Melbourne, but in the First World War he returned to the UK, where he obtained a commission in the Black Watch.

He was wounded in the war and his death notice in 1926 states that he died as a result of his wartime injuries.
