= William A. Osborn =

American businessman

William A. Osborn (born 1947) is an American bank executive.

William A. Osborn was graduated from Northwestern University in 1969 and from its Kellogg School of Management in 1973. He joined Northern Trust in 1970, and spent the rest of his career at the Chicago, Illinois institution. Eventually he headed the commercial banking and personal financial services business units, and became president and chief operating officer in December 1993. He was chairman and CEO of Northern Trust Corporation multibank holding company and the Northern Trust Company bank from 1995 through 2007. Other directorships include Caterpillar Inc., Nicor Inc., and the Tribune Company. Osborn has been a director of Caterpillar since 2000. Osborn was appointed to the board of General Dynamics (military weapons maker). In 2011, he became chairman of the board of trustees of Northwestern University, replacing Patrick Ryan.

== Awards ==
William A. Osborn was inducted as a laureate of The Lincoln Academy of Illinois and awarded the Order of Lincoln (the state's highest honor) by the governor of Illinois in 2006 in the area of business and social service.
