= 1979 in Norway =

- Centuries: 18th; 19th; 20th; 21st
- Decades: 1950s; 1960s; 1970s; 1980s; 1990s
- See also: List of years in Norway

Events in the year 1979 in Norway.

== Incumbents ==
- Monarch – Olav V.
- Prime Minister – Odvar Nordli (Labour Party)

== Events ==
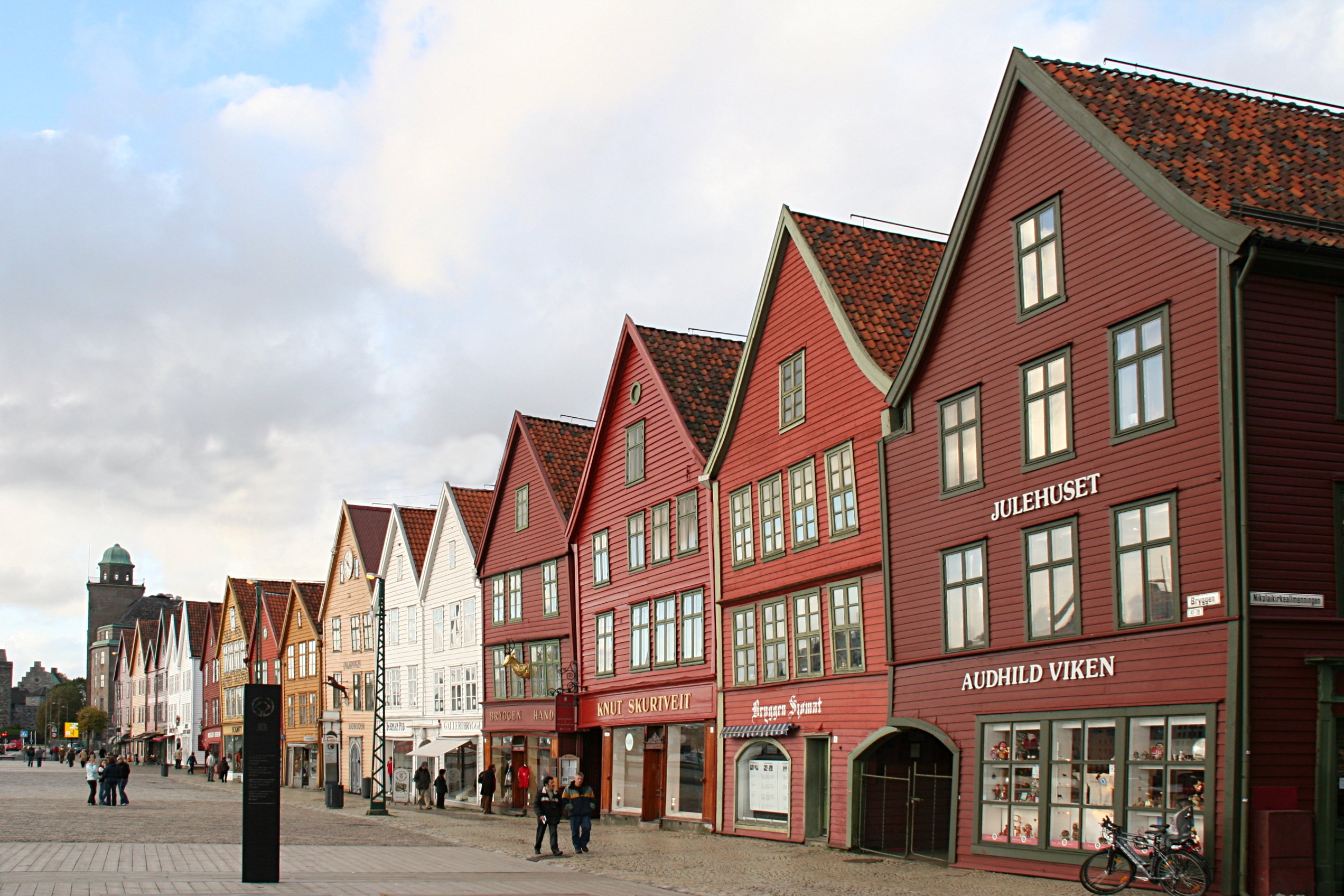
Bryggen and the Urnes stave church are designated by UNESCO as World Heritage Sites.

- Municipal and county elections are held throughout the country.
- Bryggen and the Urnes stave church are designated by UNESCO as World Heritage Sites.
- The death penalty is abolished for all crimes.
- 18 September – A fire in Vålerenga Church, which was later made into a song that became the club hymn for Vålerenga.
- The Alta Controversy continues led by the indigenous Sámi people, many Norwegians protest the construction of a hydroelectric dam on the Alta River in Northern Norway. The protests included hunger strikes, an occupation of the parliament lawn, and other forms of civil disobedience.
- The Troll gas field was proven, containing 1,300 billion cubic metres of gas, making it one of Norway's most significant energy discoveries.
- The Statfjord A platform began production in 1979. At the time of its discovery in 1974, Statfjord was the largest oil discovery in the North Sea.
- Labour removed Brundtland from the Government after the party's weak local elections in 1979, as it was considered necessary to let party leader Reiulf Steen join Nordli's Government. She then began serving in the Storting (parliament) on finance and foreign affairs committees.

== Popular culture ==
=== Film ===
- March – the planet Hoth scenes from the Hollywood film "The Empire Strikes Back" were filmed in the Hardangerjøkulen glacier.

=== Television ===
- 1 December – During an episode of Jul i Skomakergata on NRK, Sandmännchen premieres on Norwegian television for the first time.

=== Literature ===
- Åge Rønning, writer and journalist, is awarded the Riksmål Society Literature Prize.
- Nils Johan Rud, novelist, short story writer and magazine editor, is awarded the Dobloug Prize for Swedish and Norwegian fiction.
- Bjørg Vik, writer, playwright and journalist, is awarded the Norwegian Critics Prize for Literature for the short stories En håndfull lengsel.

== Notable births ==
=== January ===
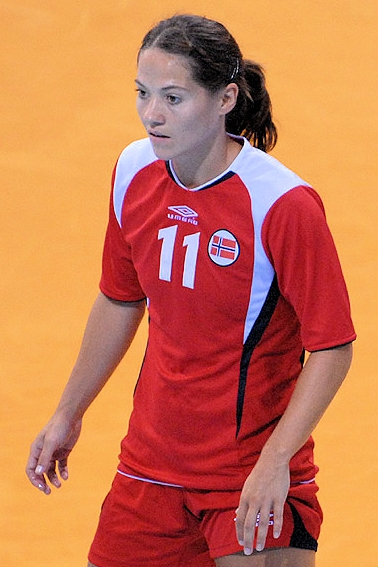
Kari Mette Johansen, Olympic gold medalist in handball 2008 and 2012.

- 1 January – Anders Danielsen Lie, actor
- 4 January – Audun Ellingsen, jazz musician
- 5 January – Håvard Klemetsen, Nordic combined skier
- 7 January – Andreas Hauger, footballer
- 8 January – John Anders Bjørkøy, footballer
- 11 January – Kari Mette Johansen, handball player.
- 12 January – Åsa Elvik, politician
- 13 January – Einar Kalsæg, footballer
- 16 January – Espen Isaksen, footballer
- 20 January – Marte Reenaas, ski orienteering competitor
- 21 January – Thomas Berling, footballer
- 22 January – Ailo Gaup, motocross rider
- 22 January – Svein Oddvar Moen, footballer
- 23 January – Jarl Espen Ygranes, ice hockey player
- 24 January – Anita Auglend, singer

=== February ===
- 2 February – Olav Råstad, footballer
- 10 February – Johan Harstad, author
- 11 February – Joachim Sørum, footballer
- 13 February – Anders Behring Breivik, far-right domestic terrorist

=== March ===
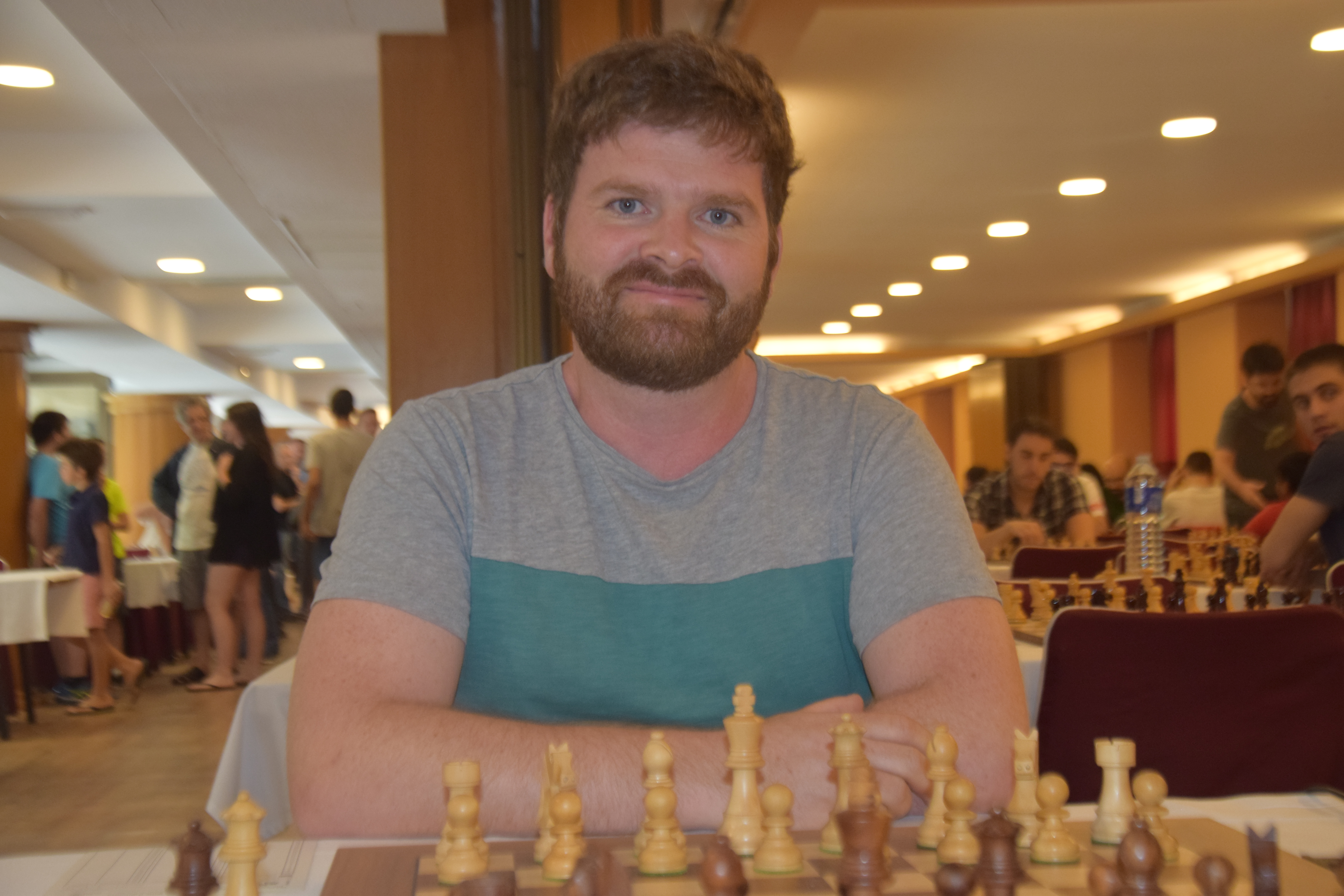
Torbjørn Ringdal Hansen

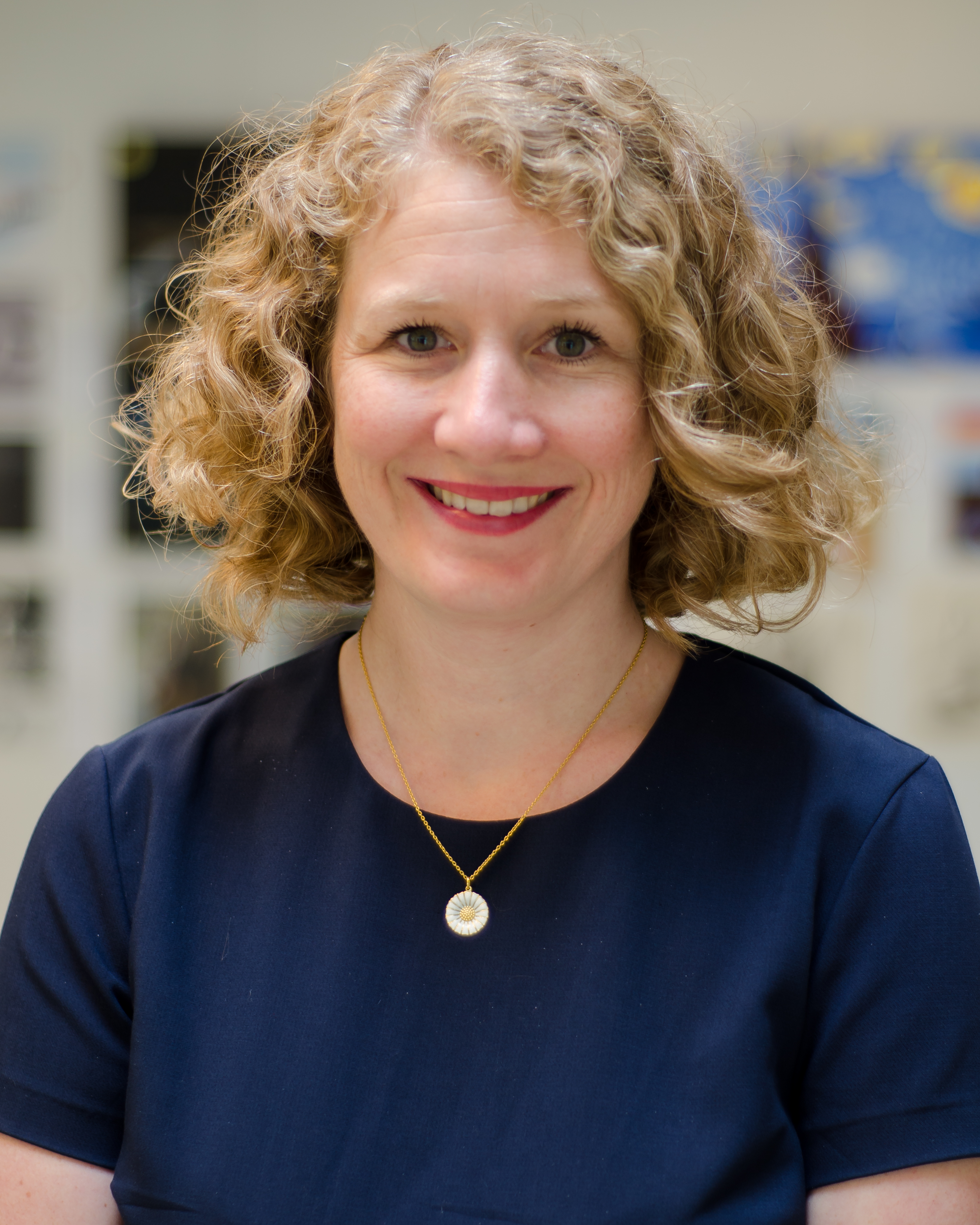
Tuva Moflag

- 1 March – Torbjørn Ringdal Hansen, chess player.
- 6 March – Aksel Magdahl, sailor
- 11 March
  - Roger Hjelmstadstuen, snowboarder
  - Morten Tandberg, football manager
- 13 March
  - Børge Lund, handball player.
  - Espen Olsen, footballer
- 15 March – Ola Berger, ski mountaineer anc cross-country skier
- 17 March – Tuva Moflag, politician.
- 20 March – Liv Kjersti Bergman, biathlete
- 23 March – Jostein Hasselgård, singer

=== April ===
- 2 April – Stian Westerhus, guitarist
- 5 April – Jørgen Tengesdal, footballer
- 8 April – Rune Stordal, speed skater
- 9 April – André Jørgensen, handball player
- 10 April – Kai Risholt, footballer
- 10 April – Roger Risholt, footballer
- 12 April – Thomas Dybdahl, musician
- 12 April – Lars Granaas, footballer
- 17 April – Hanne Hukkelberg, singer-songwriter
- 20 April – Stian Barsnes-Simonsen, actor
- 20 April – Kenneth Kapstad, musician
- 23 April – Saera Khan, politician.
- 24 April – Tor Henning Hamre, footballer
- 25 April – Nils-Torolv Simonsen, rower
- 25 April – Martin Sjølie, pianist, songwriter and record producer

=== May ===
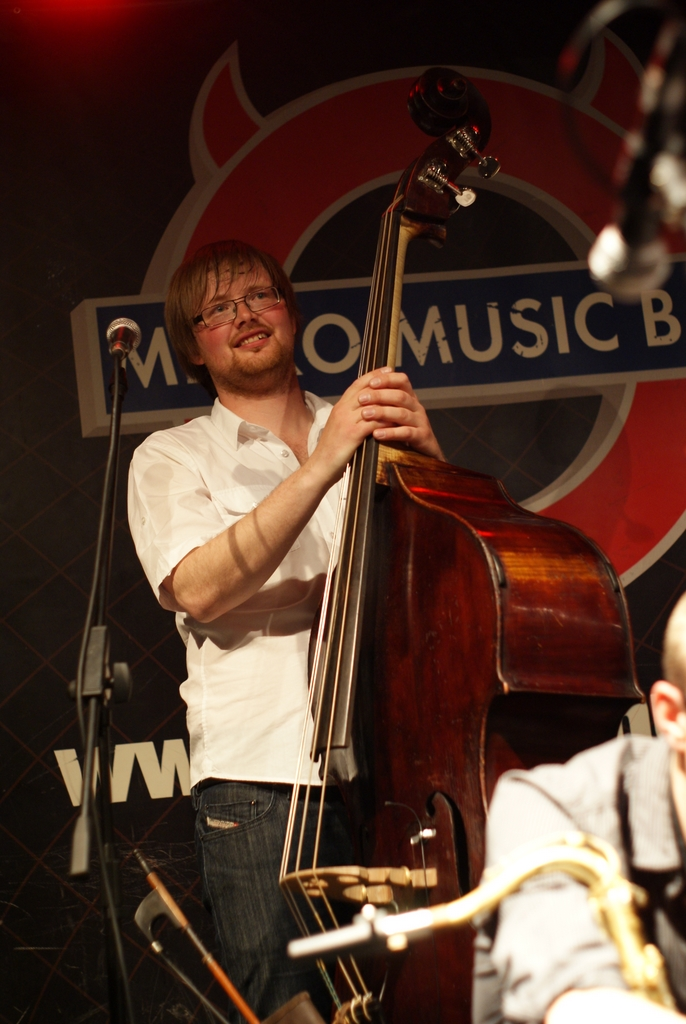
Ole Morten Vågan

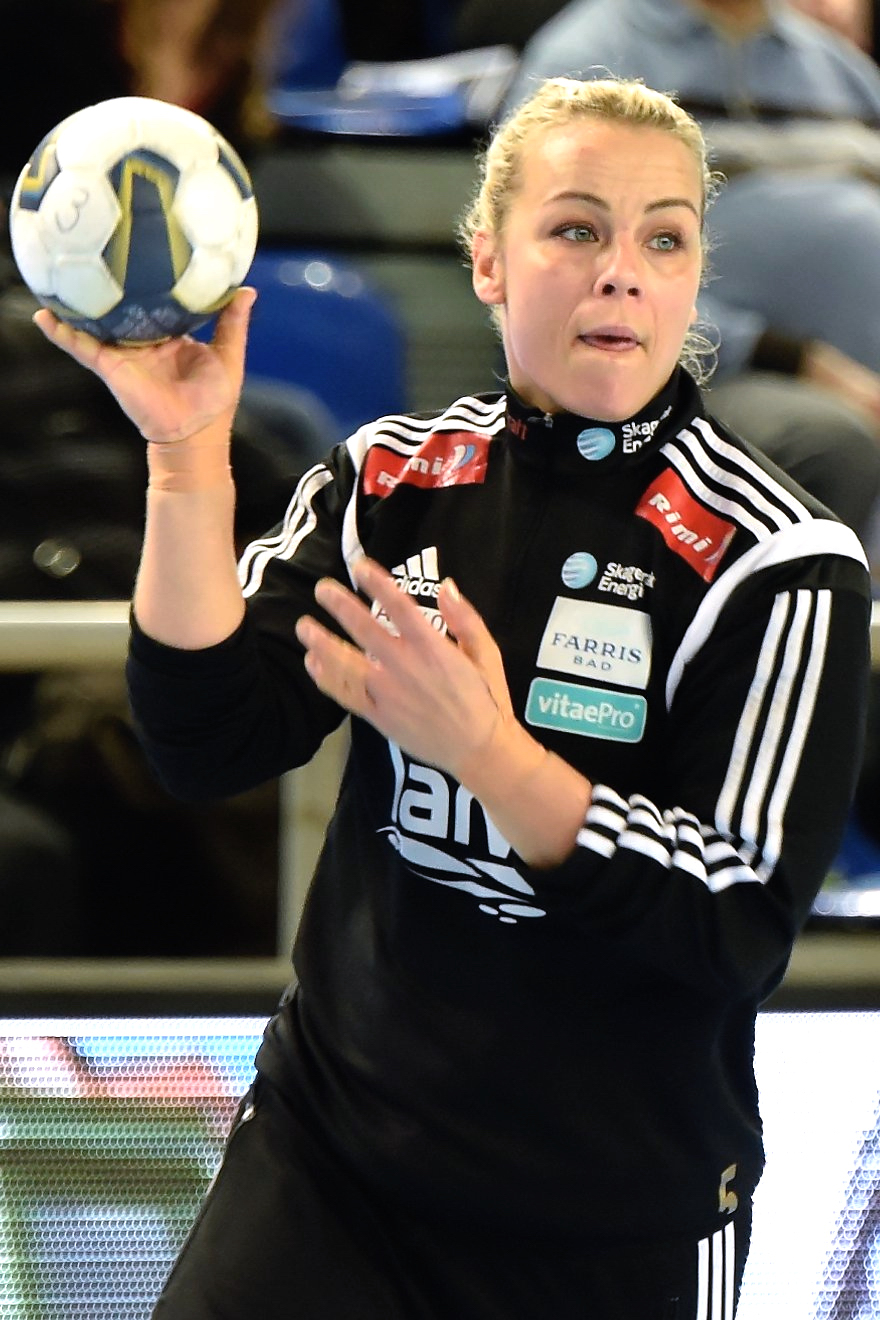
Isabel Blanco

- 1 May – Lars Berger, biathlete.
- 2 May – Oddrun Brakstad Orset, ski mountaineer
- 4 May – Morten Kolseth, footballer
- 6 May – Jan Erik Mikalsen, composer
- 7 May – Henrik Bjørnstad, golf player
- 8 May
  - Marius Erlandsen, auto racing driver
  - Alf Wilhelm Lundberg, jazz musician
  - Ole Johan Singsdal, footballer
  - Ole Morten Vågan, jazz musician
- 10 May – Isabel Blanco, handball player.
- 14 May – Bård Nesteng, archer.
- 16 May – Hermund Nygård, jazz musician
- 20 May – Torgeir Micaelsen, politician.
- 21 May – Svein-Erik Edvartsen, footballer
- 22 May – Christer-André Cederberg, music producer
- 23 May – Øyulf Hjertenes, journalist, newspaper editor and media executive.
- 26 May – Joachim Hansen, mixed martial artist
- 29 May – Ella Gjømle Berg, cross-country skier.

=== June ===
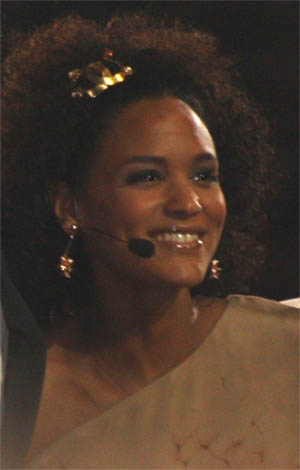
Haddy N'jie

- 8 June – Jacob Norenberg, sprint canoer.
- 13 June – Nila Håkedal, beach volleyball player.
- 21 June – Henning Braaten, skateboarder
- 23 June – Susanna Wallumrød, singer
- 25 June – Haddy N'jie, singer, songwriter, writer and journalist
- 26 June – Mathias Eick, jazz musician

=== July ===
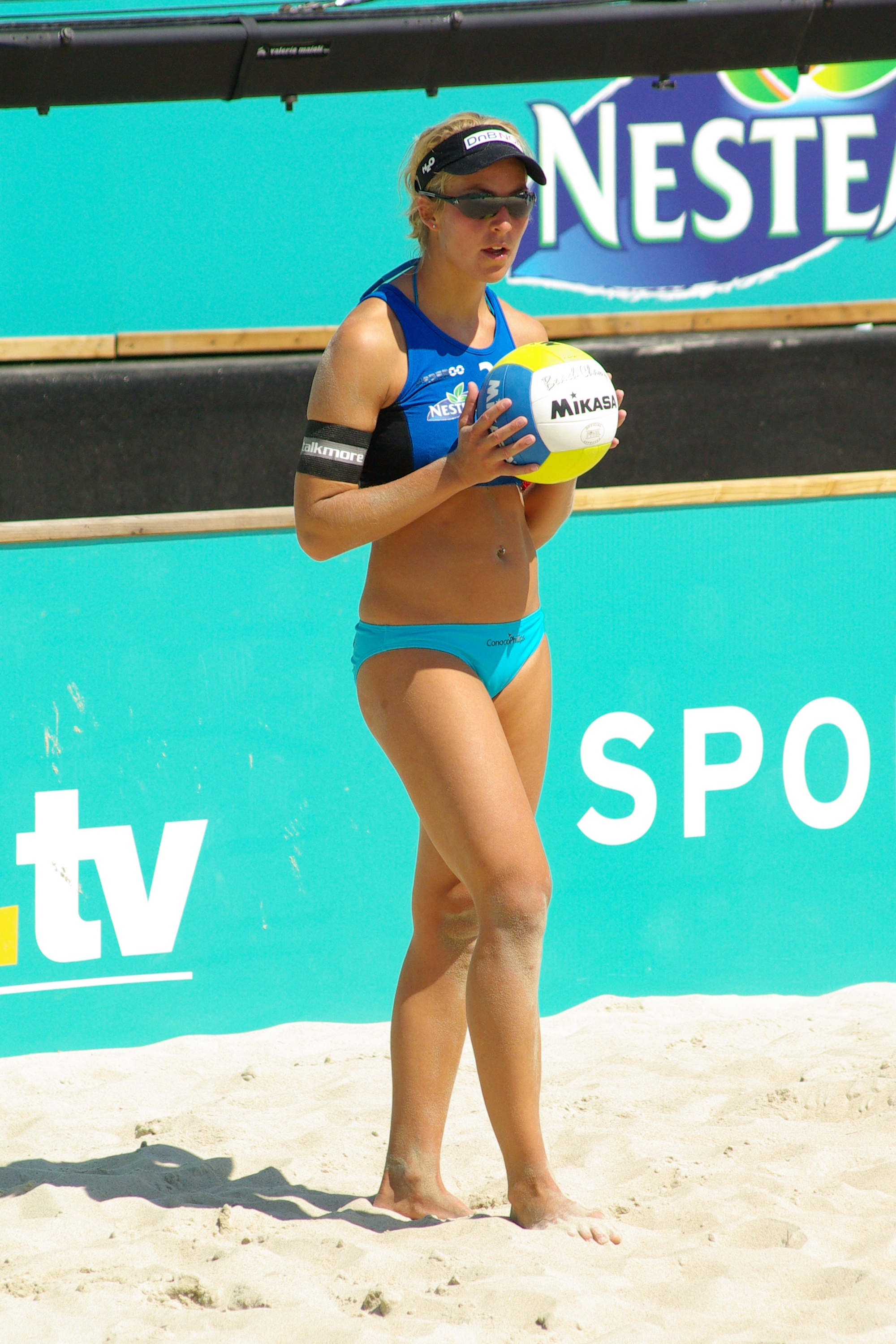
Ingrid Tørlen

- 3 July – Erik Lund, rugby union footballer
- 4 July – Lene Westgaard, political scientist
- 17 July – Lars Rørbakken, strongman
- 21 July – Ingrid Tørlen, beach volleyball player.
- 24 July – Heidi Skjerve, jazz musician
- 26 July – Bodil Ryste, ski mountaineer and cross-country skier

=== August ===
- 3 August – Maria Haukaas Mittet, singer
- 4 August –
  - Torgeir Ruud Ramsli, footballer
  - Mona Solheim, taekwondo practitioner.
  - Nina Solheim, taekwondo practitioner
- 8 August – Ellinor Jåma, politician
- 9 August – Tore Ruud Hofstad, cross-country skier
- 10 August – Ove Alexander Billington, jazz pianist and composer
- 11 August – Christer George, footballer
- 22 August – Henriette Løvar, curler
- 24 August – Katja Nyberg, handball player
- 27 August – Erik Watndal, sport shooter.
- 31 August – Camilla Huse, footballer

=== September ===
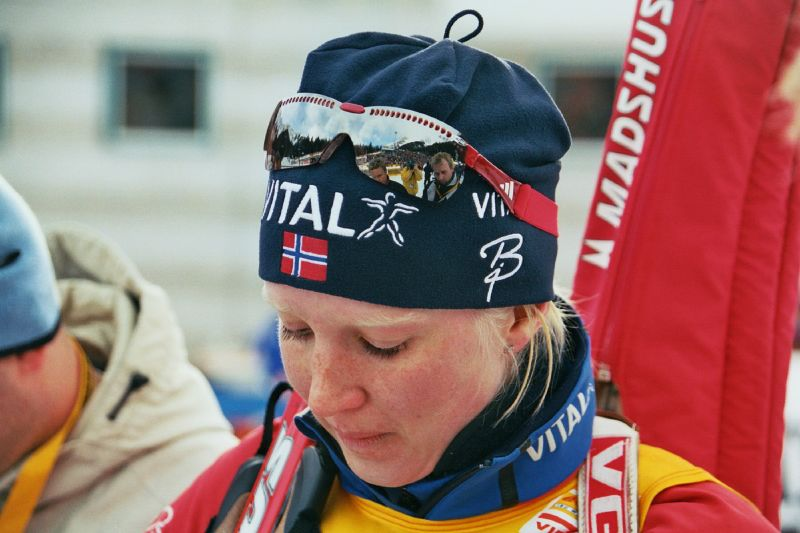
Linda Grubben, world champion in biathlon.

- 3 September – Stian Eckhoff, biathlete.
- 5 September – Kjersti Beck, handball goalkeeper
- 5 September – John Carew, footballer
- 11 September – Kenneth Høie, footballer
- 13 September – Linda Grubben, biathlete
- 15 September
  - Mahmoud Farahmand, politician.
  - Atle Gulbrandsen, racing driver and television announcer
- 22 September – Alex Valencia, footballer
- 23 September – Lisa Loven Kongsli, actress
- 24 September – Stine Hofgaard Nilsen, alpine skier

=== October ===
- 2 October – Kjetil Strand, handball player
- 5 October – Lisa Wiik, snowboarder
- 8 October – Wilhelm Brenna, ski jumper
- 9 October – Veronika Flåt, actress
- 10 October – Espen Søgård, footballer
- 14 October – Marcus Paus, composer
- 19 October
  - Ingunn Ringvold, roots singer, musician and songwriter
  - Magne Sturød, footballer
- 24 October – Lise Birgitte Fredriksen, sailor
- 27 October – Tom Hugo, musician

=== November ===
- 1 November – Tommy Knarvik, footballer
- 2 November – Nina Ellen Ødegård, actress
- 8 November – Erling Sande, politician
- 10 November – Ragnvald Soma, footballer
- 30 November – Ellen Blom, ski mountaineer

=== December ===
- 3 December – Kjersti Annesdatter Skomsvold, writer
- 6 December – Tommy Wirkola, film director, producer and screenwriter
- 10 December – Tora Augestad, musician
- 14 December – Øystein Runde, comics writer and comics artist
- 18 December – Øyvind Storflor, footballer
- 20 December
  - Espen Johnsen, footballer
  - Benedikte Shetelig Kruse, singer and actor
- 27 December – Hanne Sørvaag, musician
- 28 December – Daniel Forfang, ski jumper

=== Full date missing ===
- Dolk (artist), graffiti artist
- Morten Morland, cartoonist
- Robert Post, singer-songwriter
- Einar Selvik, musician
- Stein Urheim, jazz musician

== Notable deaths ==
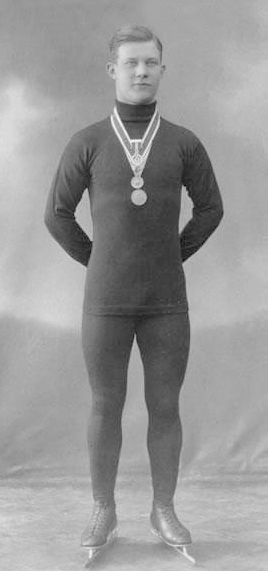
Bernt Evensen, World Allround Speed Skating Champion 1927 and 1934.

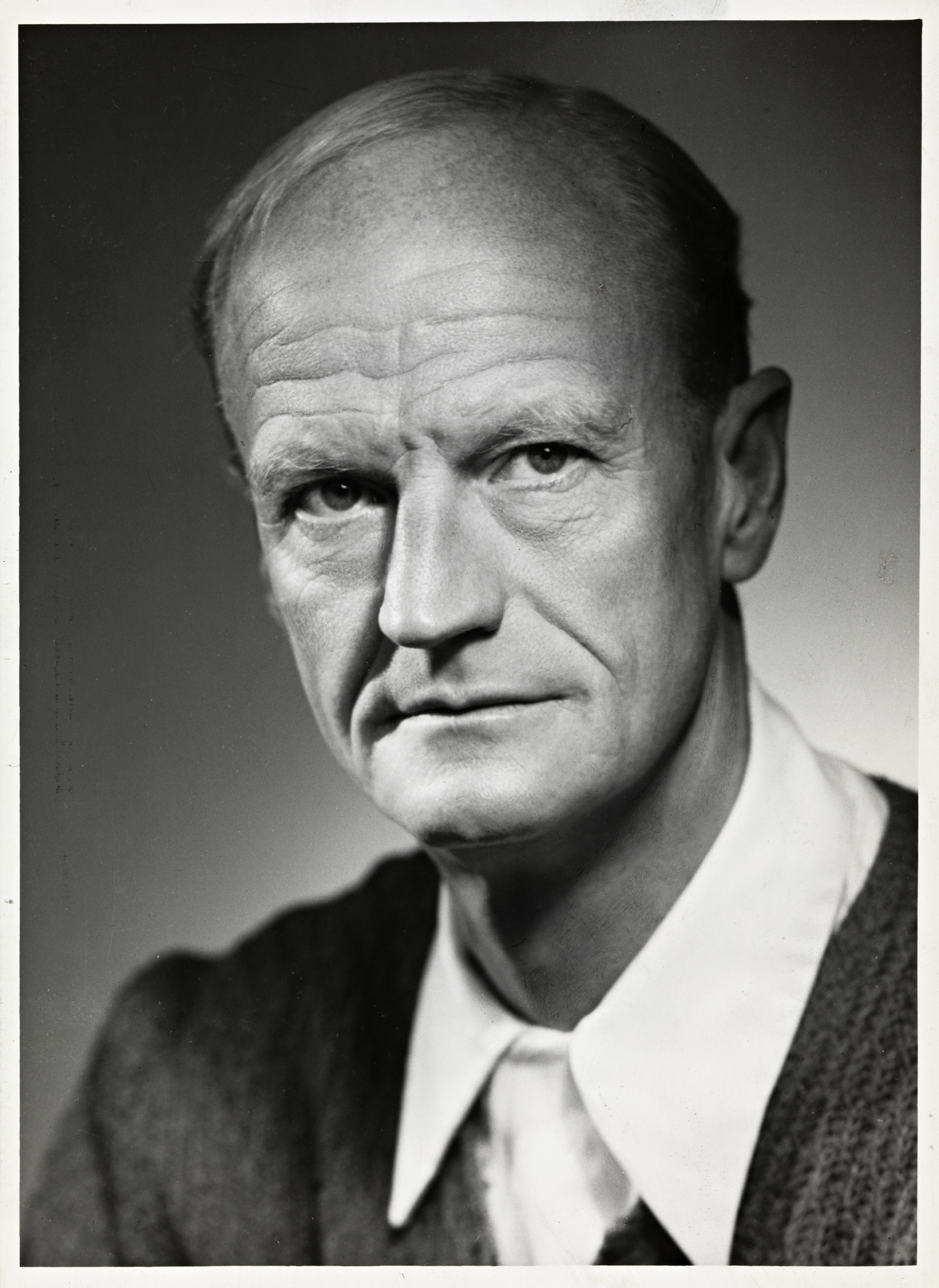
Johan Borgen, winner of the Nordic Council Literature Prize.

- 7 January – Thoralf Hagen, rower and Olympic bronze medallist (b.1887)
- 28 January – Elling Enger, composer, organist, and choir conductor (b.1905)
- 4 February – Hans Martin Gulbrandsen, canoeist (b.1914)
- 15 February – Karl Henry Karlsen, politician (b.1893)
- 7 March – Klaus Egge, composer and music critic (b.1906)
- 3 April – Dagfinn Zwilgmeyer, psalmist (b. 1900).
- 6 April – Finn Øen, politician (b.1902)
- 17 April – Trygve Olsen, politician (b.1921)
- 26 April – Trygve Stokstad, boxer (b.1902)
- 7 May – Øivind Bolstad, playwright and novelist (born 1905).
- 7 May – Erik Brofoss, economist, politician and Minister (b.1908)
- 8 June – Magnar Isaksen, international soccer player and Olympic bronze medallist (b.1910).
- 5 July – Rolf Holmberg, soccer player and Olympic bronze medallist (b.1914)
- 10 July – Harald Færstad, gymnast and Olympic silver medallist (b.1889)
- 15 July – Haakon Sløgedal, politician (b.1901)
- 28 July – Steffen Ingebriktsen Toppe, politician (b.1902)
- 6 August – Olav Hordvik, politician (b.1901)
- 24 August – Bernt Evensen, speed skater, Olympic gold medallist and racing cyclist (b.1905)
- 22 September – Tore Segelcke, actress (b.1901)
- 30 September – Johan Johannesen, track and field athlete (b.1898)
- 16 October – Johan Borgen, author, journalist and critic (b.1902)
- 16 October – Olav Svalastog, politician (b.1896)
- 14 December – Otto Monsen, track and field athlete (b.1887)

=== Full date unknown ===
- Emil Boyson, poet, author, and translator (b.1897)
- Anders Frihagen, politician and Minister (b.1892)
- Gunnar Emil Garfors, poet (b.1900)
- Jørgen Holmboe, meteorologist (b.1902)
- Rolf Østbye, businessperson (b.1898)
- Rolf Ingvar Semmingsen, civil servant (b.1908)
- Ole Siem, naval officer, businessman, and politician (born 1882).
- Nils Thomas, sailor and Olympic silver medallist (b.1889)
