= Magdahl =

Magdahl is a Norwegian surname. Notable people with the surname include:

- Aksel Magdahl (born 1979), Norwegian yacht racing navigator and author
- Jørn Magdahl (born 1950), Norwegian politician
