= Tönsberg =

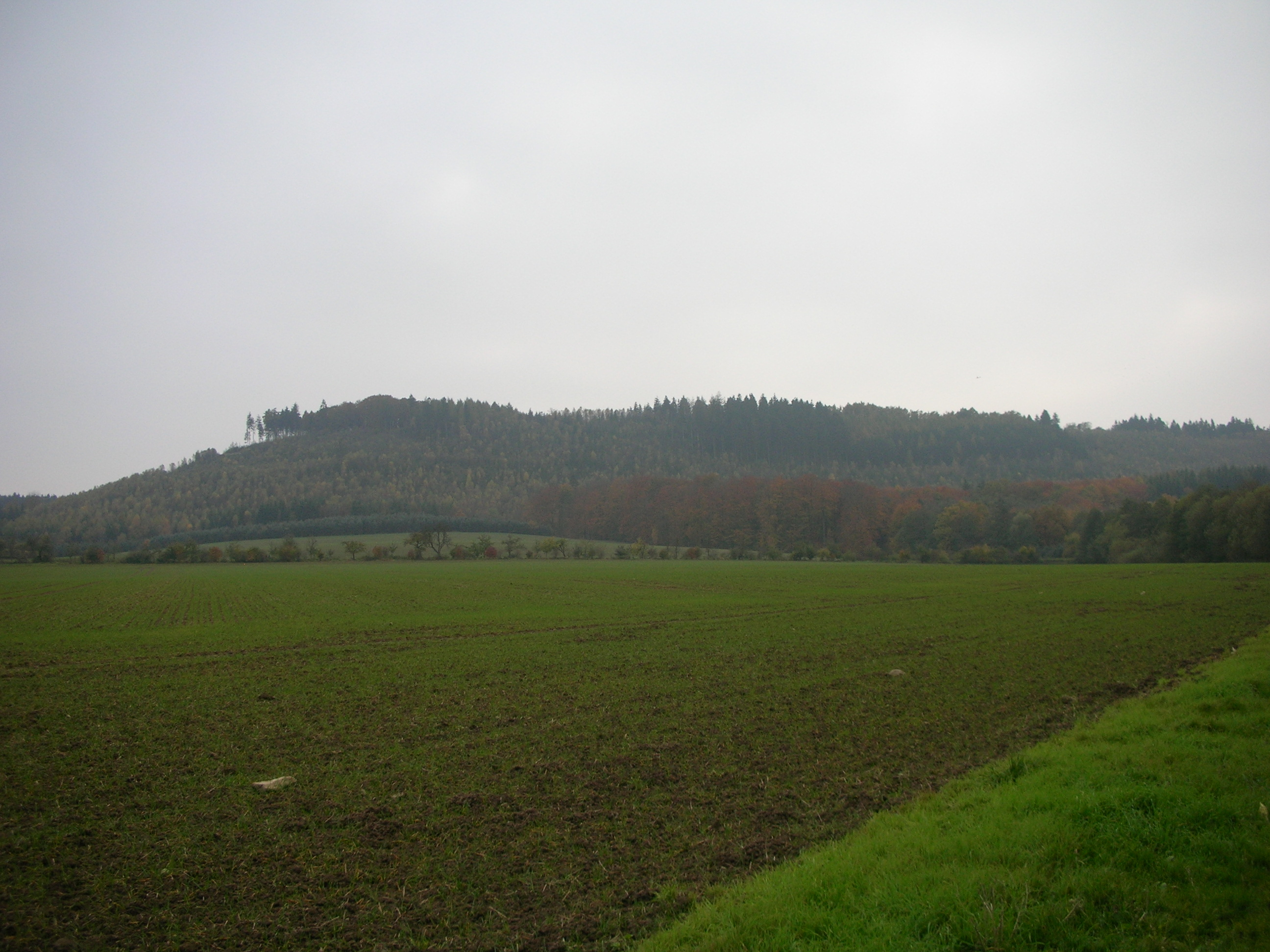
- The Tönsberg seen from the north

Highest point
- Elevation: 333.4 m above sea level (NN) (1,094 ft)
- Coordinates: 51°57′13″N 8°40′33″E

Geography
- Location within North Rhine-Westphalia
- Location: North Rhine-Westphalia, Germany
- Parent range: Teutoburg Forest

The Tönsberg is a hill ridge in the Teutoburg Forest that reaches a height of 333.4 m above sea level (NN) and lies in the district of Lippe near Oerlinghausen. Hermann's Way runs over the Tönsberg for about 3.5 km.

== Points of interest ==
Along Hermann's Way on the crest of the Tönsberg are several points of interest:

=== Hünenkapelle ===
To the east of the long ridge of the Tönsberg are the ruins of a pre-historic hillfort (Sachsenlager) and a chapel known as the Hünenkapelle. The fortification was probably used until the 9th century as a defensive site and refuge. The chapel would have been built in the time when Christianity reached the Saxons under Frankish rule. The name "Tönsberg" could go back to Holy Anthony, in whose honour the first Christian chapel could have been dedicated.

=== Löns Monument ===
In 1898 the writer, Hermann Löns, walked over Tönsberg; his impressions are recorded in his narrative, Frau Einsamkeit ("Lady Loneliness"), which appeared in 1911 in the volume Da draußen vor dem Tore: Heimatliche Naturbilder... Thirty years later a monument to him was erected on the Tönsberg and unveiled on 9 September 1928.

=== War memorial ===
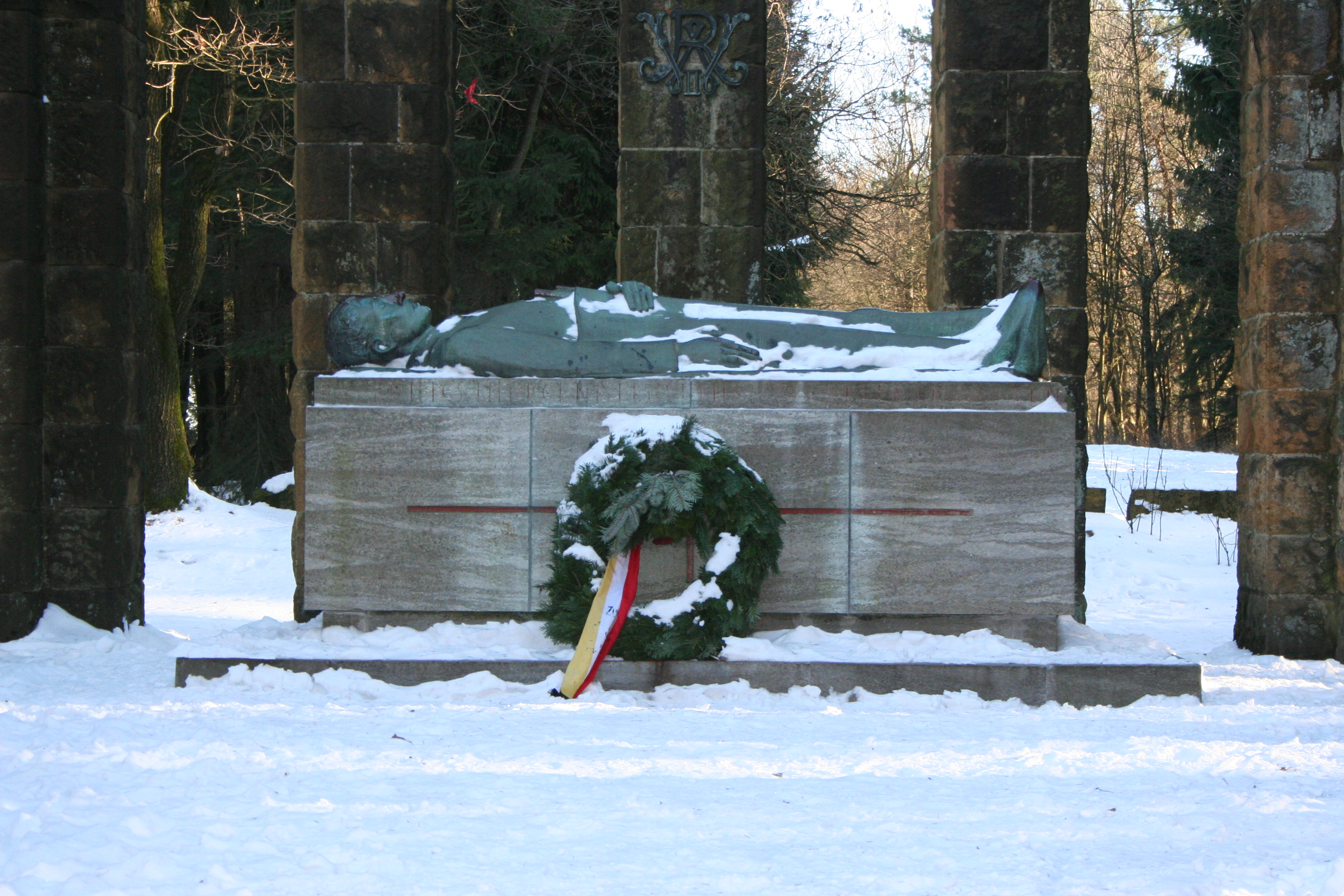
The war memorial erected in 1930 on the Tönsberg

In 1930 a war memorial was unveiled to remember the fallen from the First World War; over 5,000 people climbed the Tönsberg for the opening ceremony. It was created by the sculptor, Berthold Müller-Oerlinghausen; a soldier lies on a sarcophagus framed by columns.

In the Second World War, a British aeroplane crashed in the vicinity of the memorial in February 1945 killing two airmen. The memorial was lightly damaged.

=== Kumsttonne ===
On the Tönsberg is the ruin of an old windmill dating to 1753. The cylindrical base of the windmill is known as the Kumsttonne ("Sauerkraut barrel") and is an emblem of the town of Oerlinghausen on the north slopes of the Tönsberg.

== Coat of arms ==
The Tönsberg on Oerlinghausen's coat of arms

The Tönsberg appears, in stylised form on the coat of arms for the town of Oerlinghausen; it is the middle one of three hills depicted.

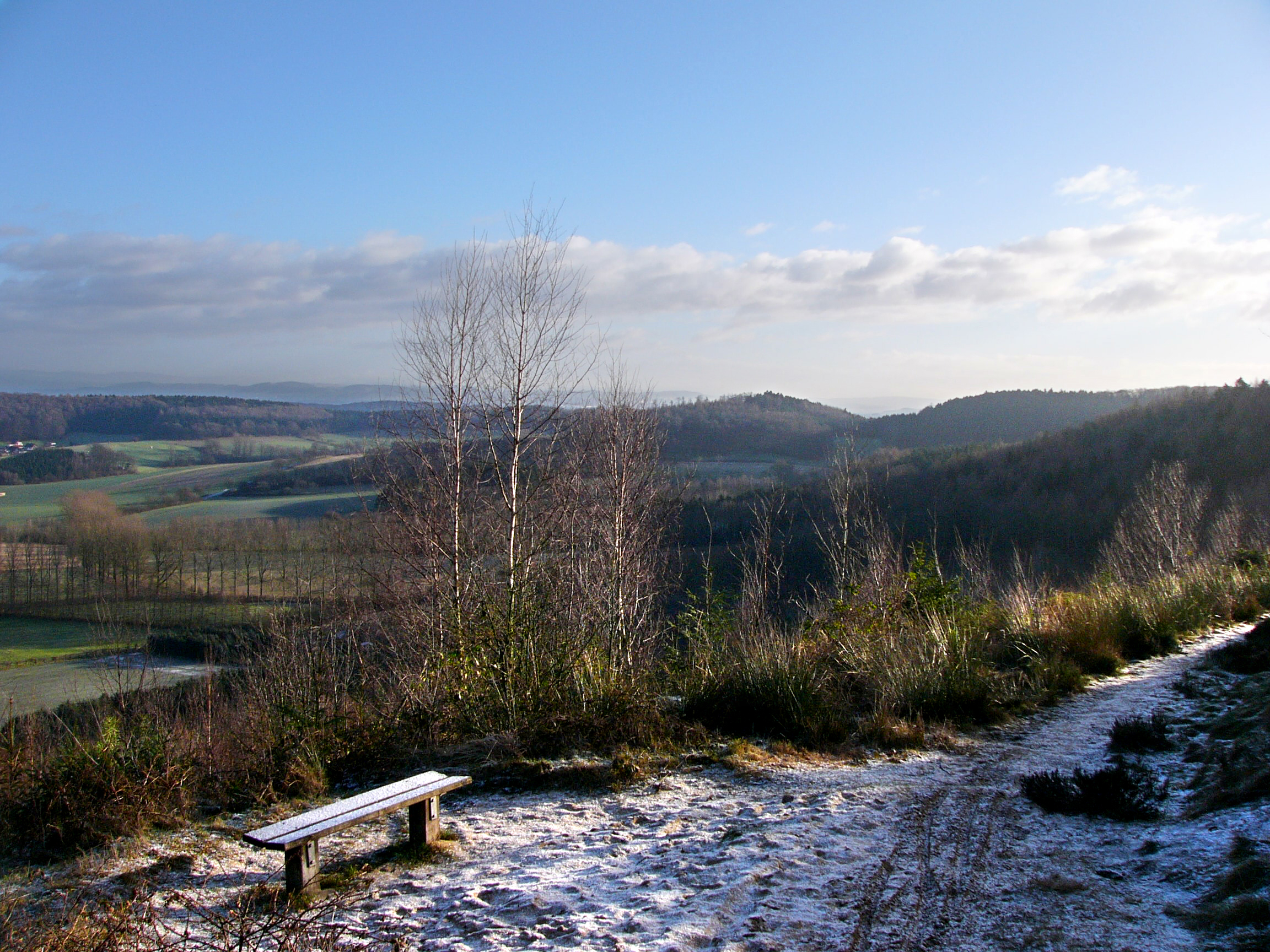
The Tönsberg in winter

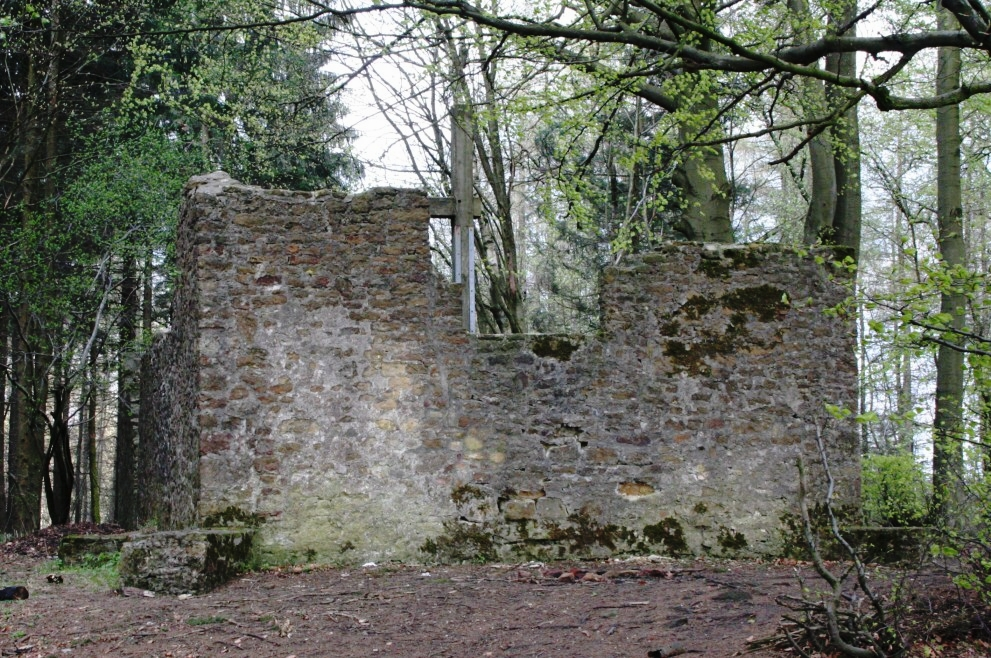
The Hünen Chapel on the Tönsberg

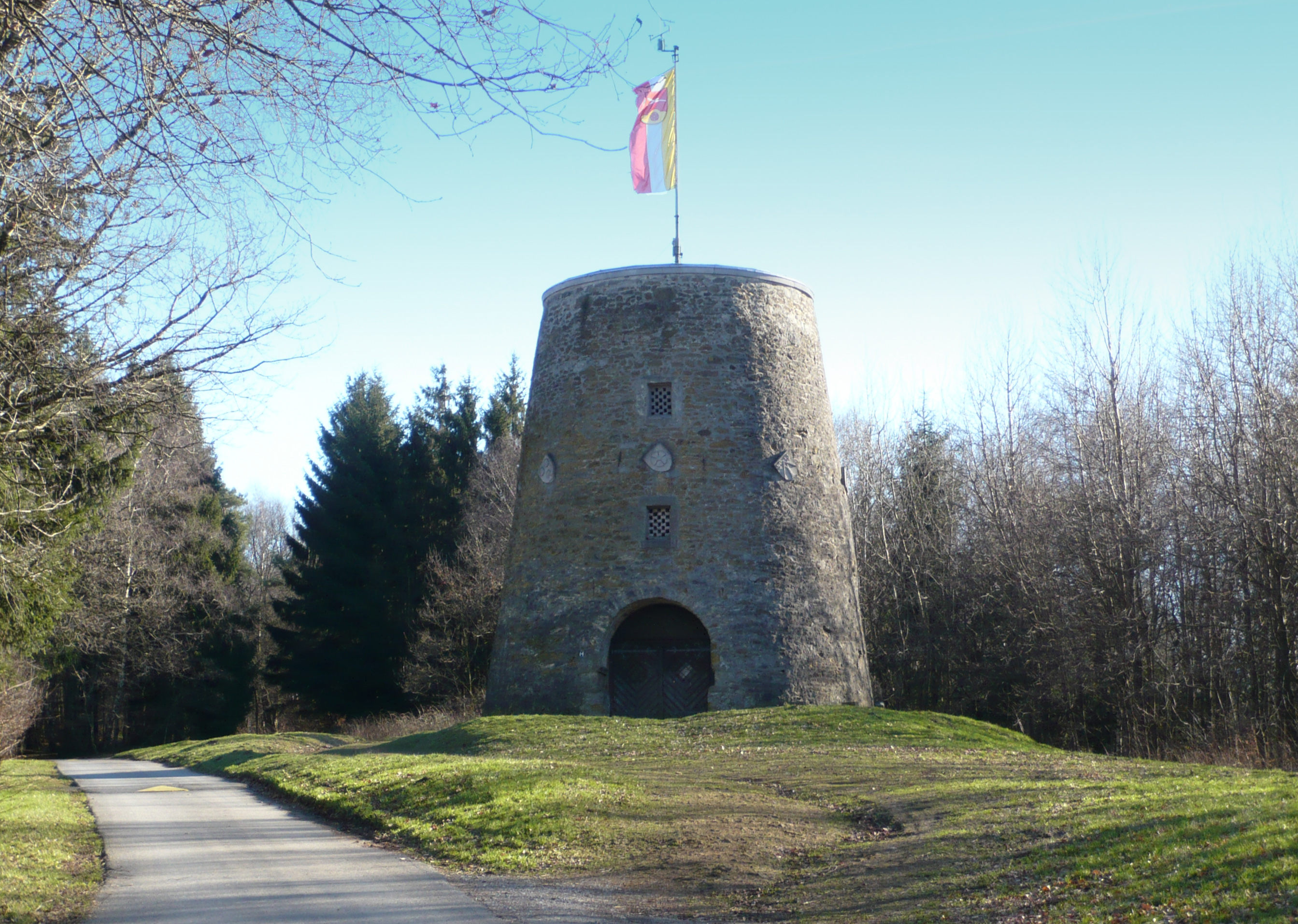
The Kumsttonne on the Tönsberg

== Sources ==
- Andreas Rahns: Der Tönsberg bei Oerlinghausen. Lippische Kulturlandschaften, Heft 7. 2007.
