= Silje Bjerke =

Norwegian chess player and magazine editor (born 1982)

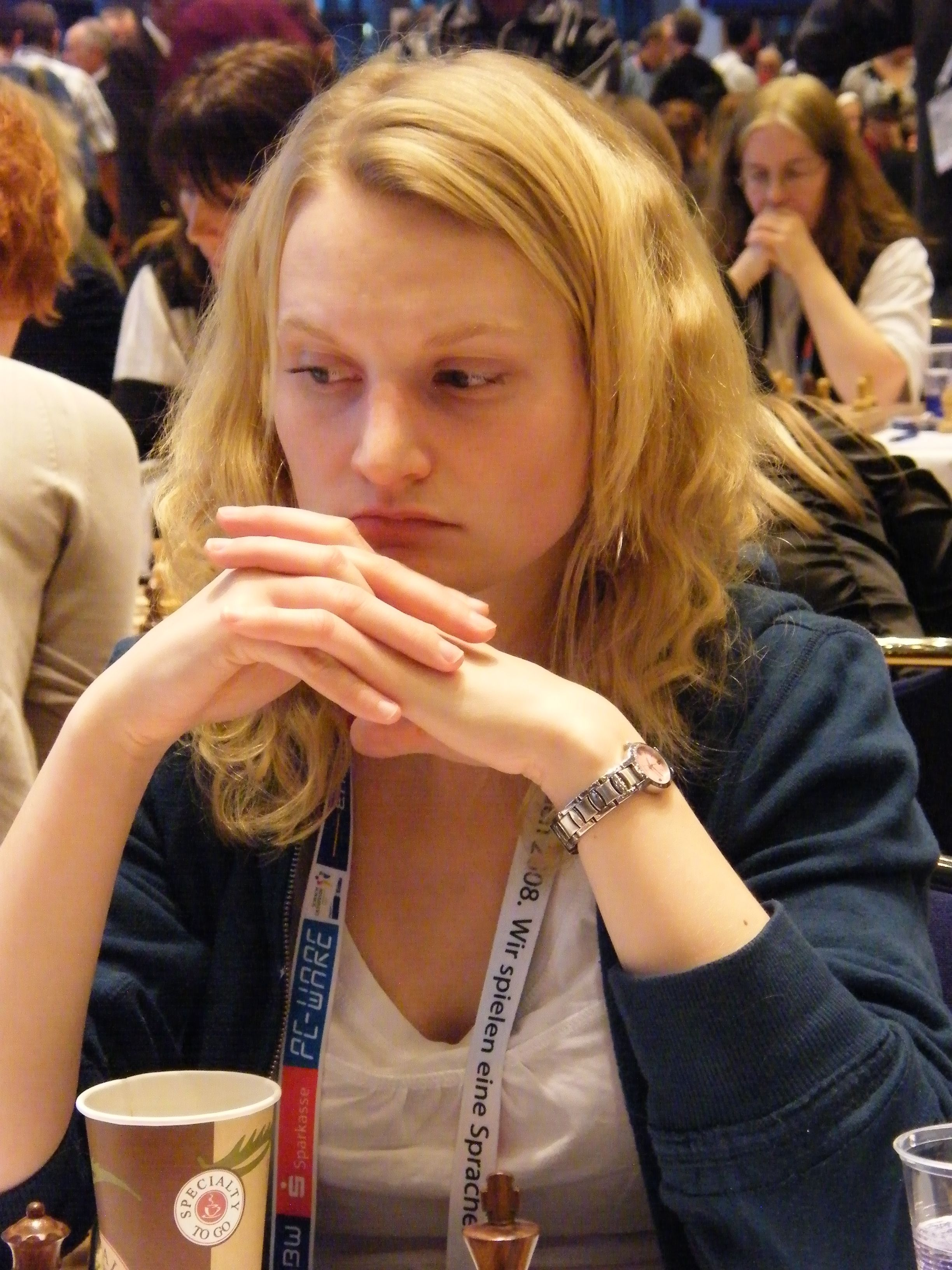

Personal information
- Born: 15 July 1982 (age 43)

Chess career
- Country: Norway
- Title: Woman International Master (2009)
- Peak rating: 2249 (September 2012)

Silje Bjerke (born 15 July 1982) is a Norwegian chess player and magazine editor. She holds the title Woman International Master, and has competed for Norway in the Women's Chess Olympiad seven times.

== Biography ==
Born on 15 July 1982, Bjerke achieved the title Woman FIDE Master in 2006, and was awarded the Woman International Master title in 2009.

She has represented Norway in seven Women's Chess Olympiads, in 2002, 2004, 2006, 2008, 2010, 2012 and 2014.

From 2009 to 2013 she was running the chess company Sjakkhuset, along with Torbjørn Ringdal Hansen and Torstein Bae. She edited the periodical Norsk Sjakkblad from 2009 to 2014.

She was licensed FIDE National Arbiter in 2016.
