= Marianne Weber =

German women's rights activist and legal historian

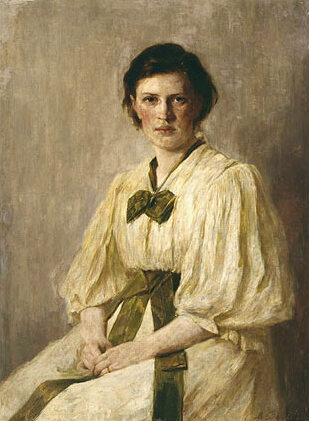
- Born: Marianne Schnitger; 2 August 1870; Oerlinghausen, Principality of Lippe, North German Confederation
- Died: 12 March 1954 (aged 83); Heidelberg, Baden-Württemberg, West Germany
- Spouse: Max Weber (m. 1893; died 1920)

Philosophical work
- Main interests: Women's movement; sociology

Member of the Landtag of the Republic of Baden
- In office 15 January 1919 – October 1919

Personal details
- Party: DDP

Marianne Weber (born Marianne Schnitger; 2 August 1870 – 12 March 1954) was a German sociologist, women's rights activist, and the wife of Max Weber.

== Life ==
=== Childhood, 1870–1893 ===
Marianne Schnitger was born 2 August 1870, in Oerlinghausen, Germany, to medical doctor, Eduard Schnitger, and his wife, Anna Weber. Her mother was the daughter of a prominent Oerlinghausen businessman, Carl David Weber.

Much of Marianne's childhood was characterized by poverty and hardship. After the death of her mother in 1873, she moved to Lemgo and was raised by her grandmother and aunt for the next fourteen years. During this time, both her father and his two brothers were institutionalized.

Marianne received her primary education at home and through the local village school. When she turned 16, Karl Weber, her grandfather, sent her to finishing schools in Lemgo and Hanover, from which she graduated when she was 19. After the death of her grandmother in 1889, she began living with her mother's sister, Alwine, in Oerlinghausen.

In 1891, Marianne began spending time with the Charlottenburg Webers, Max Jr., and his mother, Helene. She became very close to Helene, who she would refer to as being "unaware of her own inner beauty." Helene opened up to Marianne about the domestic abuse she endured during her marriage, which later inspired many of Marianne's works. Her cousin, Max Weber, formally courted her, and in 1893, they got married in Oerlinghausen. After their marriage, they moved into an apartment in Berlin to pursue academic careers.

=== Marriage, 1893–1920 ===
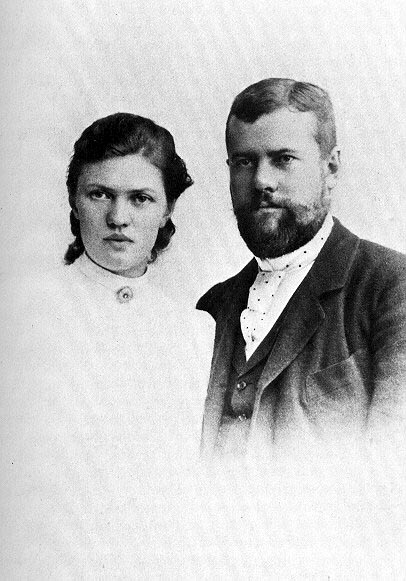
Marianne and Max Weber, 1894

In the first few years of their marriage, Max taught in Berlin, and then at the University of Heidelberg. Meanwhile, Marianne pursued her own studies. After moving to Freiburg in 1894, she studied with a leading neo-Kantian philosopher, Heinrich Rickert.

In 1895, she began engaging in the women's movement after hearing prominent feminist speakers at a political congress. In 1896, she co-founded a society for the circulation of feminist thought in Heidelberg. She worked with Max to raise the level of women students attending the university.

In 1898, Max suffered a psychological collapse after his father's death, happening shortly after an argument in which he confronted him about his abuse of Helene. Between 1898 and 1904, Max withdrew from public life, moving in and out of mental institutions, traveling compulsively, and resigning from his prominent position at University of Heidelberg. While Max worked toward recovery, Marianne cared for him and attended political meetings on his behalf. She published her first book in 1900: Fichtes Sozialismus und sein Verhältnis zur Marxschen Doktrin ("Fichte's Socialism and its Relation to Marxist Doctrine").

In 1904, the Webers toured America. Marianne met Jane Addams and Florence Kelley, both staunch feminists and active political reformers. Also during that year, Max re-entered the public sphere, publishing, among other things, The Protestant Ethic and the Spirit of Capitalism. Marianne also continued to curate her own scholarship, publishing her landmark work Ehefrau und Mutter in der Rechtsentwicklung ("Wife and Mother in the Development of Law") in 1907.

In 1907, Carl David Weber died, and left enough money to his granddaughter for the Webers to live comfortably. During this time, Marianne first established her intellectual salon. Between 1907 and the start of World War I, Marianne enjoyed a rise in her status as an intellectual and a scholar. She published "The Question of Divorce" (1909), "Authority and Autonomy in Marriage" (1912) and "On the Valuation of Housework" (1912), and "Women and Objective Culture" (1913). While the Webers presented a united front in public life, as Max defended his wife from her scholarly detractors, Max was having an affair with Else Jaffe, a mutual friend.

In 1914, during the start of the war, Max busied himself publishing his multi-volume study of religion, lecturing, organizing military hospitals, serving as an adviser in peace negotiations, and running for office in the new Weimar Republic, Marianne continued adding to her list of publications, among which were: "The New Woman" (1914), "The Ideal of Marriage" (1914), "War as an Ethical Problem" (1916), "Changing Types of University Women" (1917), "The Forces Shaping Sexual Life" (1919) and "Women's Special Cultural Tasks" (1919).

In 1918, Marianne Weber became a member of the German Democratic Party and, shortly thereafter, the first woman elected as a delegate in the federal state parliament of Baden. In 1919, she assumed the role of chairwoman of the Bund Deutscher Frauenvereine (League of German Women's Associations), an office she would hold until 1923.

In 1920, Max's sister, Lili Weber, suddenly committed suicide. Together, Max and Marianne adopted her four children. This provided Marianne some solace from Max's affair. Shortly thereafter, Max Weber contracted pneumonia and died on June 14, 1920, leaving Marianne a widow with his sister's four children.

=== Widowhood, 1920–1954 ===
Max Weber. Ein Lebensbild

Following Max's unexpected death, Marianne withdrew from public and social life, funneling her physical and psychological resources into preparing ten volumes of her husband's writing for publication. In 1924, she received an honorary doctoral degree from the University of Heidelberg, both for her work in editing and publishing Max's work, as well as for her own academic achievements. Between 1923 and 1926, Weber worked on Max Weber: Ein Lebensbild ("Max Weber: A Biography"), which was published in 1926. Also in 1926, she re-established her weekly salon, and spoke publicly to audiences of up to 5,000. During this phase, she continued to raise Lili's children with the help of a close-knit circle of friends.

==== Marianne Weber in Nazi Germany ====
Weber's career as a feminist public speaker ended abruptly in 1935 when Hitler dissolved the League of German Women's Associations. She continued to hold her weekly salon until the Allied Occupation of Germany in 1945. While criticisms of the Nazi party were sometimes subtly implied, she told interviewer Howard Becker in 1945 that "we restricted ourselves to philosophical, religious and aesthetic topics, making our criticism of the Nazi system between the lines, as it were. None of us were the stuff of which martyrs were made." Weber claimed, however, to know people who had been involved in the July Plot.

Weber continued writing, and published Frauen und Liebe ("Women and Love") in 1935 and Erfülltes Leben ("The Fulfilled Life") in 1942.

==== Later life ====
After World War II ended, Marianne began writing her own memoir. On 12 March 1954, she died in Heidelberg.

== Work ==
=== Themes ===
The basis of Weber's sociology was that of a woman in a patriarchal society. She wrote about the experiences of German women of her time, many of whom were entering the workforce for the very first time. This new exposure of women to the outside world led to shifting gender-based power dynamics within the household. The male-created and male-dominated institutions of law, religion, history and the economy provide a framework for the lives of women, whose autonomy suffers as a result. Weber also felt that the framework and structures of marriage could be used as a case study for the larger society, as marriage, and the destiny of women to be married, is central to the lives of women and could be seen across the spectrum of law, religion, history, and economy. She acknowledged that while marriage could restrict the lives of women, it could also serve as a form of protection for women, serving to undermine "the brutal power of men by contract". Weber's work, especially the 1907 Wife and Mother in the Development of Law, was devoted to the analysis of the institution of marriage. Her conclusion was that marriage is "a complex and ongoing negotiation over power and intimacy, in which money, women's work, and sexuality are key issues".

Another theme in her work was that women's work could be used to "map and explain the construction and reproduction of the social person and the social world". Human work creates cultural products ranging from small, daily values such as cleanliness and honesty to larger, more abstract phenomena like philosophy and language. Between the two extremes lies a vast, unexplored middle territory called "the middle ground of immediate daily life", in which women, being the caretakers, child-rearers, and everyday economic actors of the family, have a large part. This middle ground is where the self is created, for the most part, Weber argued, and that self then affects other people in its daily actions in the world. She also felt that the continual struggle between the spiritual and the animal is what makes people human and that rather than being a crisis to be resolved, the conflict between the natural and the moral forms the basis of human dignity. This "millennial struggle of human beings for the subordination of instinctual life under the dominion of morally free human will" is a cultural product, for the production of which women are largely responsible. Finally, Weber also felt that differences such as class, education, age, and base ideologies, had an enormous effect on the day-to-day existence of women. She saw that there are profound differences not just between rural and urban women, but also among different types of rural women and different types of urban women. Urban women, of whom Weber was one, were distinguished not just by their husbands' occupations but also by their own. Within the class of working women, women's occupations (traditional women's work versus the elite: academics, artists, writers, etc.) have an everyday effect on patterns of daily life and lead to differences in needs, lifestyle, and overall ideologies.

=== Georg Simmel and Marianne Weber ===
There has been discussion of Max Weber's scholarly connection to Georg Simmel, particularly in terms of their influence on the Frankfurt School, but Marianne Weber too was a colleague of Simmel. In addition to a more than 20-year friendship, in which Max and Simmel conversed and wrote letters often, Weber wrote a critical response to Simmel's 1911 essay "The Relative and the Absolute in the Problem of the Sexes", in which she criticized his concept of "gender relations". Both sociologists dealt with the "woman question" and, more broadly, "the interrelation between gendered modes of individuation, social differentiation, and gender difference".

=== Publications ===
- "Occupation and Marriage" (1906)
- "Wife and Mother in the Development of Law" (1907)
- "Authority and Autonomy" (1912)
- "On The Valuation of Housework" (1912)
- "Women and Objective Culture" (1913)
- "Women, Men and Human Nature: The Critique by Marianne Weber"
- "Women's Special Cultural Tasks" (1919)

== Select publications ==
- Fichtes Sozialismus und sein Verhältnis zur Marschen Doktrin ("Fichte's Socialism and its Relation to Marxist Doctrine", 1900)
- Beruf und Ehe ("Occupation and Marriage", 1906)
- Ehefrau und Mutter in der Rechtsentwicklung ("Wife and Mother in the Development of Law", 1907)
- Die Frage nach der Scheidung ("The Question of Divorce", 1909)
- Autorität und Autonomie in der Ehe ("Authority and Autonomy in Marriage", 1912)
- Über die Bewertung der Hausarbeit ("On the Valuation of Housework", 1912)
- Frauen und Kultur ("Women and Objective Culture", 1913)
- Max Weber. Ein Lebensbild ("Max Weber: A Biography", 1926)
- Die Frauen und die Liebe ("Women and Love", 1935)
- Erfülltes Leben ("The Fulfilled Life", 1942 – republished in 1946)
- Lebenserinnerungen ("Memoirs", 1948)

== See also ==
- History of feminism
- Feminism in Germany

== Works cited ==
- "Marianne Weber (1870– 1954): A Woman-Centered Sociology," Patricia M. Lengermann and Jill Niebrugge-Brantley. The Women Founders: Sociology and Social Theory, 1830–1930 : a Text/reader. Boston: McGraw-Hill, 1998.
- Weber, Marianne. 1975. Max Weber: a biography. New York: Wiley.
- Scaff, Lawrence A. 1998. "The `cool objectivity of sociation': Max Weber and Marianne Weber in America." History Of The Human Sciences 11, no. 2: 61. Academic Search Premier, EBSCOhost (accessed 11 November 2011)
- "History of the German Women's Movement". Translated by Robert Burkhardt, assisted by members of the Translation Workshop organized by the Goethe-Institut. Boston, January–March 1998.
- Becker, Howard; Weber, Marianne (1951). "Max Weber, Assassination and German Guilt: An Interview with Marianne Weber". American Journal of Economics and Sociology. 10 (4): 401–405. doi:10.1111/j.1536-7150.1951.tb00068.x.
- Wobbe, Theresa, 2004. "Elective affinities: Georg Simmel and Marianne Weber on gender and modernity." Engendering the Social: Feminist Encounters with Sociological Theory. eds. Barbara L. Marshall and Anne Witz. Maidenhead, England: Open University Press. pp 54–68.
- Weber, Marianne, 1913. "Authority and Autonomy in Marriage." trans. Craig R. Bermingham. Sociological Theory, Vol. 21, No. 2 (Jun. 2003), pp. 85–102.
- Dickinson, Edward Ross (2005). "Dominion of the Spirit over the Flesh: Religion, Gender and Sexual Morality in the German Women's Movement before World War I.". Gender & History. 17 (2): 378–408 [382]. doi:10.1111/j.0953-5233.2006.00386.x. S2CID 143008042.
- Lundskow, G. N. (2008). "The Sociology of Religion: a Substantive and Transdisciplinary approach". Los Angeles: SAGE.
- Lengermann, P., & Niebrugge-Brantley, J.(1998). The Women Founders: Sociology and Social Theory 1830–1930. New York: McGraw-Hill.
