= Oerlinghausen Airfield =

Gliding airfield in Oerlinghausen, North Rhine-Westphalia, Germany

Oerlinghausen Airfield Oerlinghausen Segelflugplatz
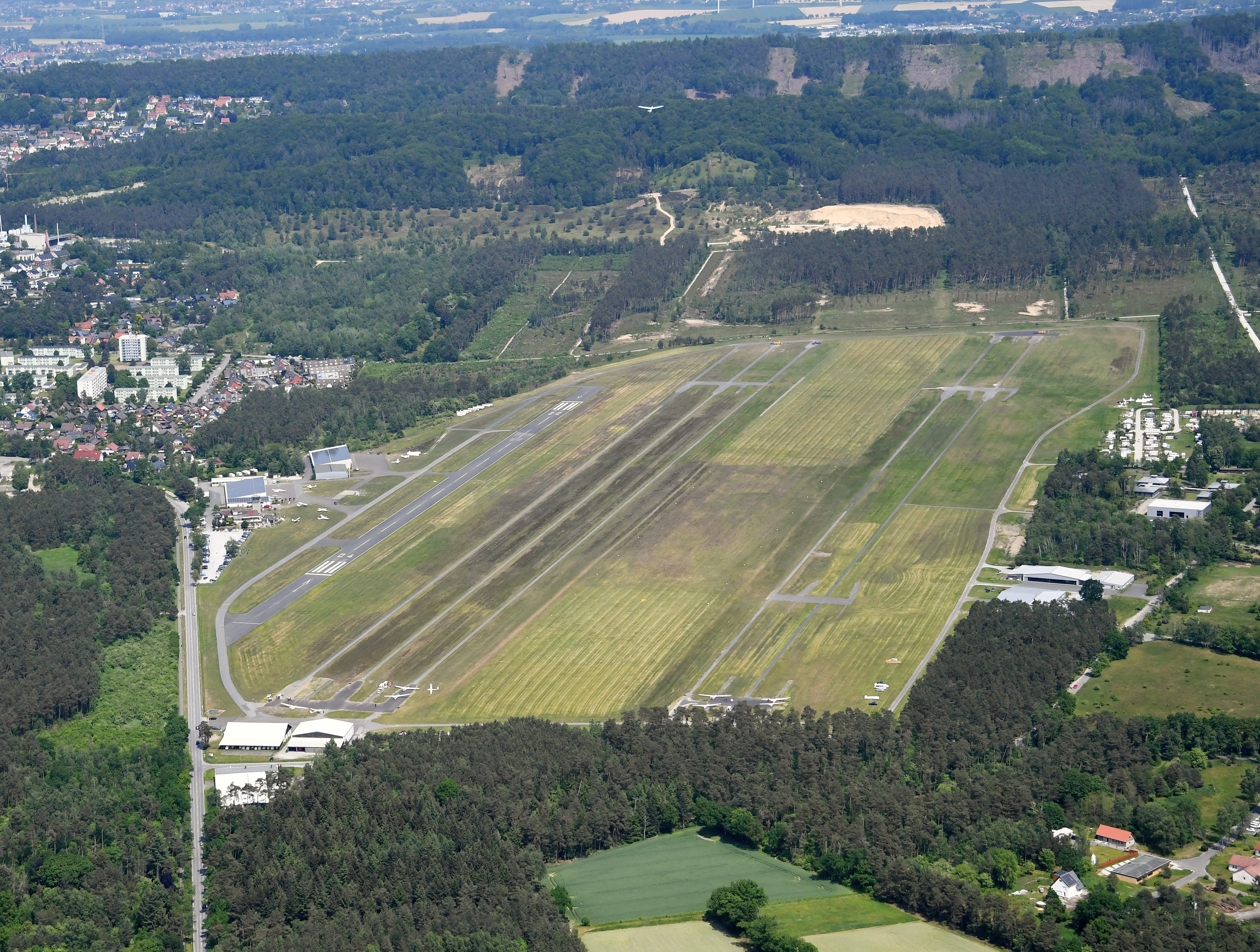
- IATA: none; ICAO: EDLO

Summary
- Airport type: Public
- Operator: Flugplatzgemeinschaft e.V.
- Location: Oerlinghausen, North Rhine-Westphalia, Germany
- Elevation AMSL: 170 m / 557 ft
- Coordinates: 51°56′35″N 8°40′12″E
- Website: flugplatz-oerlinghausen.de/en/home-english/
- Interactive map of Oerlinghausen Airfield

Runways
Direction	Length		Surface
Direction	m	ft	Surface
04/22	600	1,969	Asphalt
04/22 glider	1,000	3,281	Grass

Statistics
- Glider take-offs: 25,000
- Information provided by the airport operator.

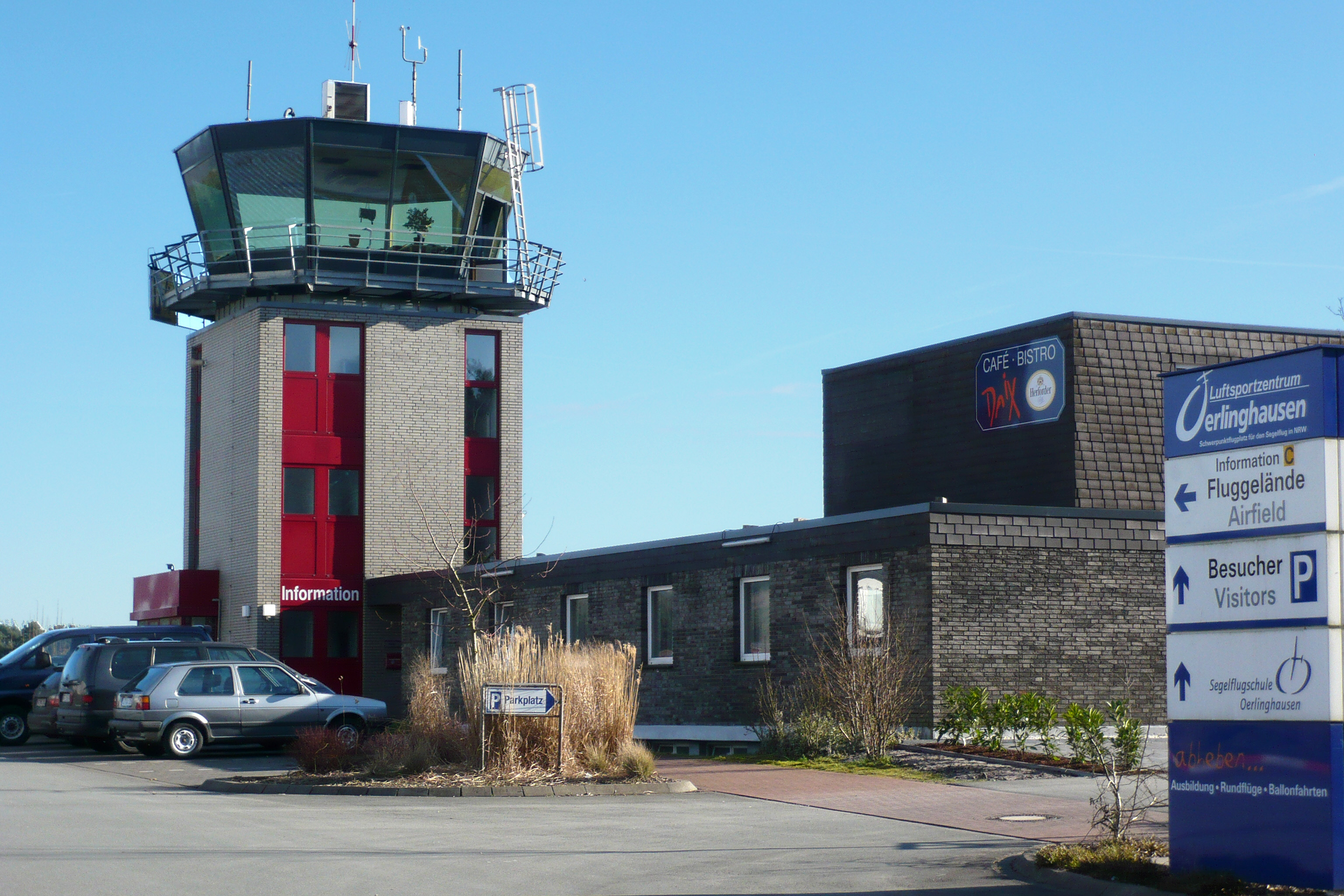
Tower in Oerlinghausen

Oerlinghausen Airfield (ICAO: EDLO), known as Oerlinghausen gliding airfield (German: Oerlinghausen Segelflugplatz) is a small airfield situated in the town of Oerlinghausen, close to Bielefeld in the North Rhine-Westphalia region of Germany. With around 25,000 glider take-offs each year it is one of the largest gliding centres globally, comparable with Lasham Gliding Society in the United Kingdom. It is home to over 10 gliding clubs and a gliding school. It is also used by powered aeroplanes, microlights and hot air balloons.
