= Hanning Elektro-Werke =

German family-owned company

Coordinates: 51.943761°N 8.650909°E

Hanning Elektro-Werke GmbH & Co. KG
- Company type: GmbH & Co. KG (Germany)
- Founded: 1947 in Germany
- Founder: Robert Hanning
- Headquarters: Oerlinghausen
- Key people: Nader Halmuschi; Stephan Mönch; Alexander Hanning; Maximilian Hanning
- Number of employees: around 1,500 employees in the international production network
- Divisions: Industry Sector, Engineering Sector
- Website: www.hanning-hew.com

Hanning Elektro-Werke GmbH und Co. KG, (limited partnership with a limited liability company as general partner) a German family-owned company, was founded in 1947 by Robert Hanning and is part of the international production network. It employs around 1,500 people worldwide.

== Company history ==
The company was established in 1947 by Robert Hanning under the name ’Elektrobau Hanning GmbH’ in Lipperreihe near Bielefeld (Germany). In 1977 the company name was changed to ’HANNING ELEKTRO-WERKE GmbH & Co. KG’. Due to HANNINGs' stable and economic growth, the factory as well as the storage in Oerlinghausen was expanded in 1980. After the German reunification the company then established itself in 1992 in Eggesin, as the largest employer of the city. The HANNING production network, to which HANNING ELEKTRO-WERKE belongs, comprises around 1,500 employees at four locations in Germany (Oerlinghausen and Eggesin), Romania and India. In addition, there are sales partners on all continents.

== Products ==
=== Products of the market division Industrial Applications ===
Customized synchronous/asynchronous motor systems, electronically controlled drives, encapsulated synchronous/asynchronous drives, synchronous/asynchronous drives with housing, frameless drives, customized inverter systems, encapsulated frequency inverters, inverters with housing, frameless frequency inverters and more Customized pump systems, electronically controlled pumps, encapsulated pumps, pumps with housed or frameless motors and more

=== Products of the market division Appliance Applications ===
Customized pump systems, electronically controlled pumps, encapsulated pumps, pumps with housed or frameless motors, customized synchronous/asynchronous fan systems, electronically controlled fan drives, encapsulated synchronous/asynchronous fan drives, synchronous/asynchronous fan drives with housing, frameless fan drives and more

=== Products of the market division Linear Actuators ===
Customized linear actuator systems, electronically controlled linear actuators, encapsulated linear actuators, linear actuators with housing, frameless linear actuators, lifting columns and more Customized synchronous/asynchronous motor systems, electronically controlled drives, encapsulated synchronous/asynchronous drives, synchronous/asynchronous drives with housing, frameless drives and more

== Certification ==
- DIN EN ISO 9001
- DIN EN ISO 14001
- DIN EN ISO 50001
