= Torbjørn Ringdal Hansen =

Norwegian chess grandmaster (born 1979)

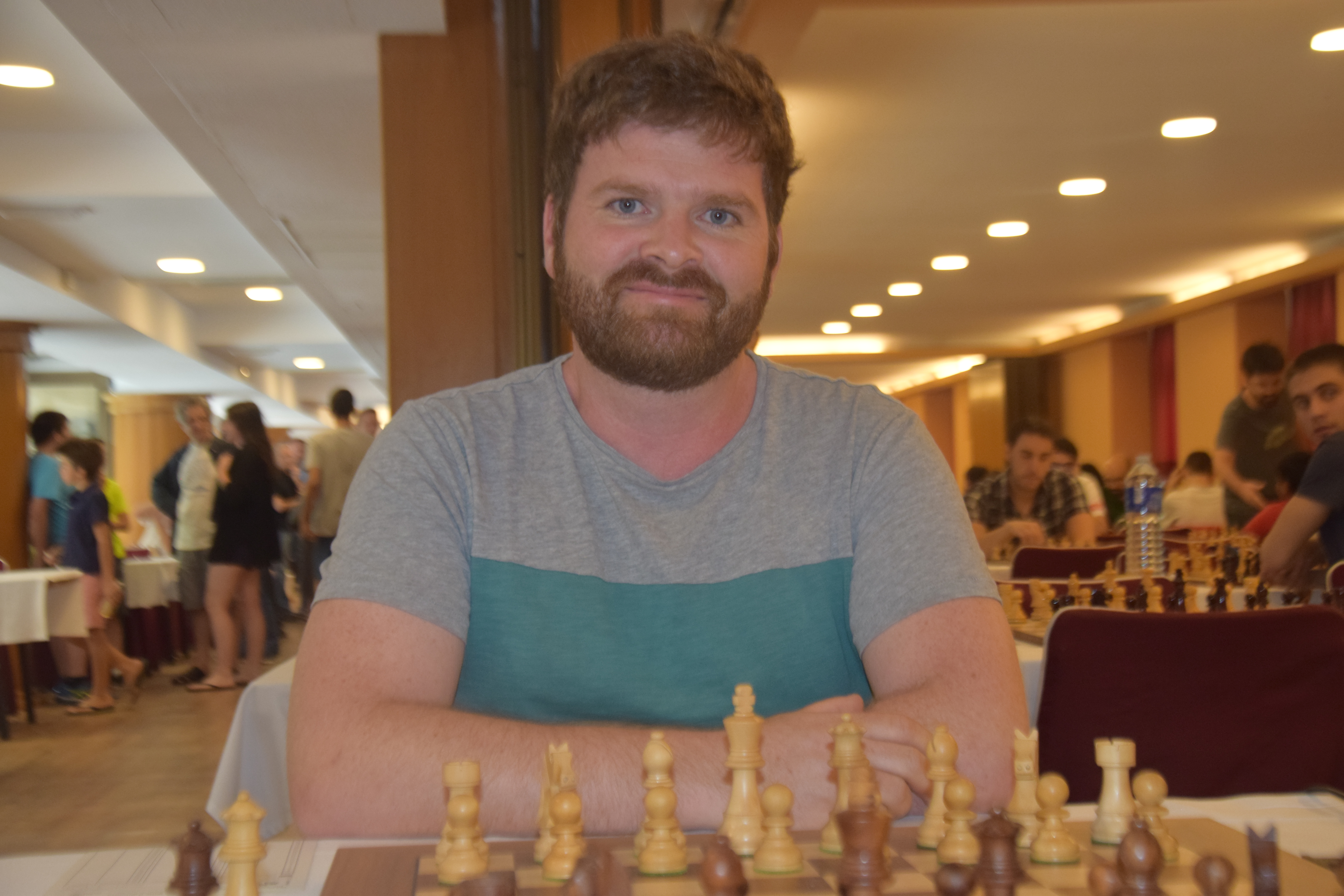
- Hansen at the 2017 Andorra open

Personal information
- Born: 1 March 1979 (age 47) Røyken, Norway

Chess career
- Country: Norway
- Title: Grandmaster (2015)
- Peak rating: 2501 (May 2015)

Torbjørn Ringdal Hansen (born 1 March 1979 in Røyken) is a Norwegian chess grandmaster.

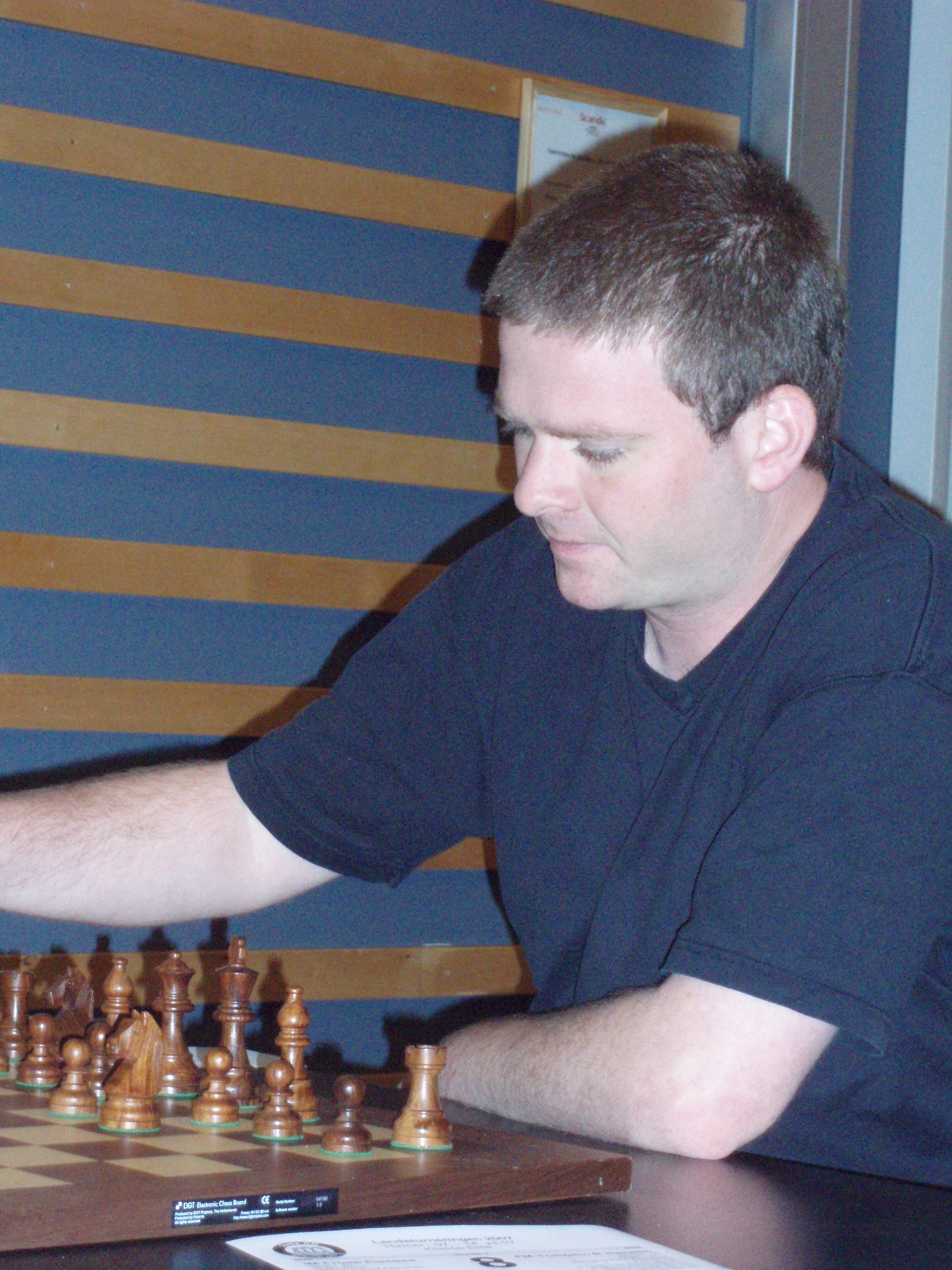
Hansen in 2007

He achieved the title International Master in 2008, and was awarded the Grandmaster title in 2015.

== Chess career ==
Hansen was the first coach of later World Champion Magnus Carlsen, from 2000 to 2001, when Hansen served a one-year alternative civilian service programme at the Norwegian College of Elite Sport. Carlsen was nine years old at the time, and trained chess in a group along with two other children, organized by Hansen. Carlsen's rating improved from about 900 to 1,900 during this one-year period.

Hansen achieved his first Grandmaster norm in the 2003/04 Rilton Cup in Stockholm, with subsequent norms in the Norwegian Premier League in 2007/08 and in Almeria in 2011. He was designated IM in 2008 and GM in 2015.

From 2009 to 2013 he was running the chess company Sjakkhuset, along with Silje Bjerke and Torstein Bae.

== Early and personal life ==
Hansen was born on 1 March 1979. Having learned chess as a child from his father, his child and youth achievements include becoming "Lilleputt" national champion in 1992, 13 years old. Further, he became Norwegian "Kadett" champion in 1995, and Norwegian junior champion in 1998.
