= Aksel Magdahl =

Norwegian sailor

Aksel Magdahl (born 6 March 1979, in Tönsberg), is a Norwegian yacht racing navigator, author of the tactics that took the boat Ericsson 3 to the victory in the fifth leg of the Volvo Ocean Race. The stage was the longest in the history of the race and it was disputed between the Chinese city of Qingdao and in Rio de Janeiro, Brazil.

== Background ==
In early 1985, master painter and yachtsman Kjell-Rune Magdahl bought an Optimist dinghy for his son Aksel, who had just turned six. The hope was that little Aksel would develop an interest in boats and sailing, just like his dad. But Aksel's interest in boats almost never set sail. He sailed his Optimist at home off Tønsberg on the Oslofjord’s west coast, but at the age of 11, other interests, such as computers and football, took the upper hand. When he was 19, he rekindled his interest in regatta sailing after he completed his military service, not in the navy but with an assault team in the Norwegian cavalry.

Aksel studied economics at the BI Norwegian School of Management in Oslo, but his sailing career bloomed, and in 2004 two-time Volvo Ocean Race skipper Knut Frostad brought him on board his ORMA60 trimaran Nokia Academy, winning the Nokia Oops Cup total in their first season together. With Nokia Academy he combined his computer skills and sailing talent to become a full-blood professional racing navigator, and he also managed this project for two of his three years there.

It was the same Knut Frostad who, in early 2007, told Aksel that he might be Anders Lewander's and Magnus “Mange” Olsson's first choice as navigator for Ericsson in the Volvo Ocean Race 2008–09. Aksel and Mange went on to lead the underdog team Ericsson 3, and the inexperienced team surprised the sailing world with three consecutive third places in the first three legs of the race after solid offshore sailing and some unusual navigation. He applied new decision-making- and analysis techniques and became established as one of the top offshore navigators in his first try.

Outside sailing, Aksel won the regional road cycling championship in Vestfold, Norway in 2011, and is a keen private pilot.

== Work ==
2004-´06 Nokia Oops Cup with Team Nokia Academy ORMA60 trimaran

2008-´09 Volvo Ocean Race Participation Fourth place Offshore: Legs 1, 2, 3, 4, 5, 6, 7, 8, 9, 10 In-Port: Alicante, Singapore, Boston, Galway, Stockholm

2011-´12 Volvo Ocean Race, Team Sanya

Sailing Achievements 2004–Nokia Oops Cup, multihull 60-foot (1st place), SORC (2nd place), North American Championship, Farr40 (3rd place) 2005–Nokia Oops Cup, multihull 60-foot (2nd place), IMS Nationals, mainsail/tactics (Champion) 2004–Nokia Oops Cup, multihull 60-foot (Champion), Faerder-Skagen, multihull record, Soling Nationals (2nd place) 2003–IMS European Championship (2nd place), Several 1st-3rd positions with WCST
