= Jarl Espen Ygranes =

Norwegian ice hockey player

- Born: January 23, 1979 (age 47) Oslo, Norway
- Height: 6 ft 2 in (188 cm)
- Weight: 205 lb (93 kg; 14 st 9 lb)
- Position: Defence
- Shot: Left
- Played for: Furuset; Frisk Asker; Vålerenga
- National team: Norway
- NHL draft: 228th overall, 1997; Montreal Canadiens
- Playing career: 1998–2005

Jarl Espen Ygranes (born January 23, 1979) is a former Norwegian professional ice hockey player.

Ygranes was drafted by the Montreal Canadiens in the ninth round (228th overall) in the 1997 NHL entry draft but never played in the NHL and remained in Norway throughout his professional career. He played in the GET-ligaen for Furuset, Frisk Asker and Vålerenga. He was also a member of the Norway national ice hockey team.

== Career statistics ==
			Regular season					Playoffs
Season	Team	League	GP	G	A	Pts	PIM	GP	G	A	Pts	PIM
1997–98	London Knights	OHL	25	0	7	7	19	—	—	—	—	—
1997–98	Furuset IF	Norway	13	0	2	2	10	—	—	—	—	—
1998–99	Furuset IF	Norway	43	2	11	13	56	—	—	—	—	—
1999–00	Frisk Asker	Norway	37	2	7	9	57	—	—	—	—	—
2000–01	Frisk Asker	Norway	33	3	11	14	22	—	—	—	—	—
2001–02	Frisk Asker	Norway	19	1	7	8	33	—	—	—	—	—
2002–03	Vålerenga Ishockey	Norway	37	5	9	14	30	—	—	—	—	—
2003–04	Vålerenga Ishockey	Norway	39	4	13	17	111	—	—	—	—	—
2004–05	Vålerenga Ishockey	Norway	33	7	6	13	139	—	—	—	—	—
Norway totals			254	24	66	90	458	—	—	—	—	—
