= Magne Sturød =

Norwegian footballer (born 1979)

Personal information
- Date of birth: 19 October 1979 (age 47)
- Place of birth: Ulefoss, Norway
- Height: 1.81 m (5 ft 11 in)
- Position: Midfielder

Senior career*
Years	Team	Apps	(Gls)
- Ulefoss
- Skarphedin
2001–2005	Sandefjord	101	(15)
2006	OB	12	(0)
2007–2008	Horsens	13	(0)
2009–2010	Kongsvinger	14	(0)
2011	Notodden	14	(2)
- * Club domestic league appearances and goals as of 30 June 2011

Magne Sturød (born 19 October 1979) is a Norwegian professional football midfielder.

He started his career at Ulefoss and Skarphedin, before joining the larger club Sandefjord. After the 2005 season he went to Denmark and OB. He left OB after only a year for the rival club Horsens. Ahead of the 2009 season he returned to Norway and Kongsvinger.

Sturød joined Notodden ahead of the 2011 season, and played 14 matches and scored two goals for the club until 30 June 2011, when he left the club.
