= Oerlinghausen =

- Town
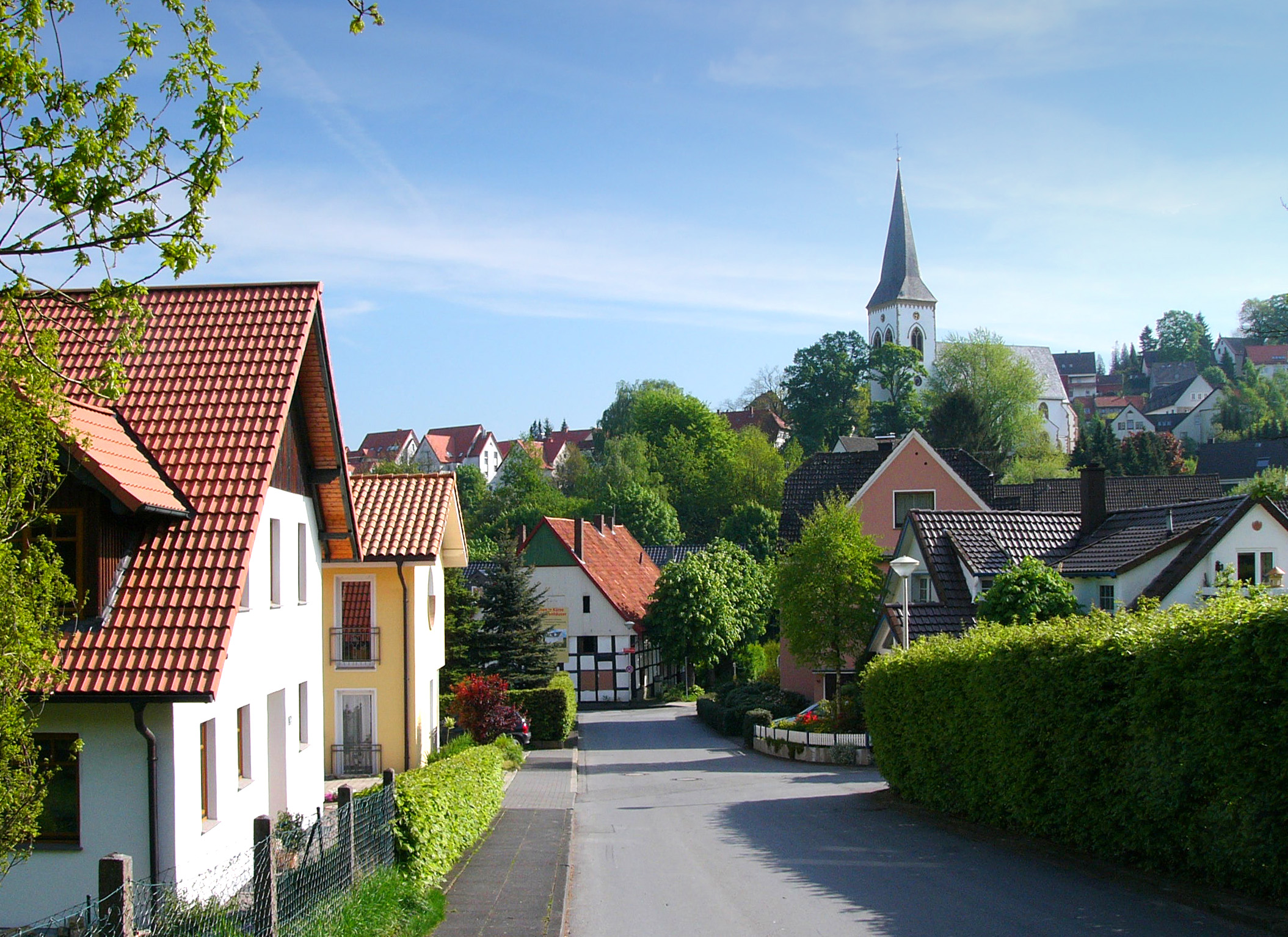
- A view of Oerlinghausen

- Flag Coat of arms

- Location of Oerlinghausen within Lippe district
- Interactive map of Oerlinghausen
- Location within Germany Location within North Rhine-Westphalia
- Coordinates: 51°58′00″N 08°40′00″E
- Country: Germany
- State: North Rhine-Westphalia
- Admin. region: Detmold
- District: Lippe

Government
  - Mayor (2020–25): Dirk Becker (SPD)

Area
  - Total: 32.69 km^{2} (12.62 sq mi)
- Elevation: 214 m (702 ft)

Population (2025-12-31)
  - Total: 17,302
  - Density: 529.3/km^{2} (1,371/sq mi)
- Time zone: UTC+01:00 (CET)
  - Summer (DST): UTC+02:00 (CEST)
- Postal codes: 33813
- Dialling codes: 05202
- Vehicle registration: LIP
- Website: oerlinghausen.de

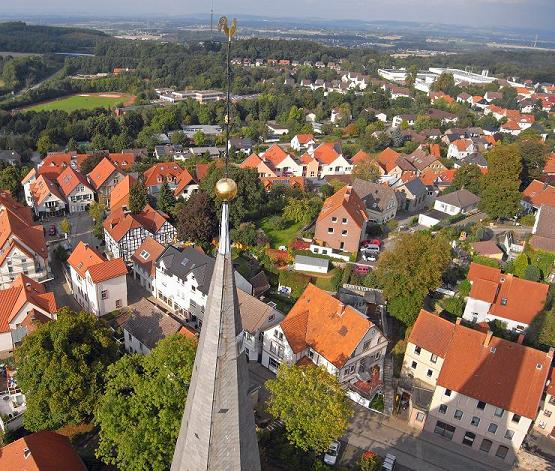
Aerial view of Oerlinghausen

Oerlinghausen (German pronunciation: [œʁlɪŋˈhaʊzn̩]; Low German: Ankhiusen) is a city in the Lippe district of North Rhine-Westphalia, Germany, located between Bielefeld and Detmold in the Teutoburg Forest. At the end of February 2023, it had 17,314 inhabitants.

== Geography ==
Geographically, Oerlinghausen is situated on top of the Teutoburger Forest hills. Oerlinghausen's highest point is the Tönsberg with 334 meters. The flatlands of northern Germany start some 40 km north of Oerlinghausen. There are hiking routes (such as the Hermannsweg) along the hill chain which stretches 80 km in east-west direction. To the south of the hills are large sand areas originating from melting glaciers during past ice ages. Although not high, the hills are steep in many places and almost completely covered by forest.

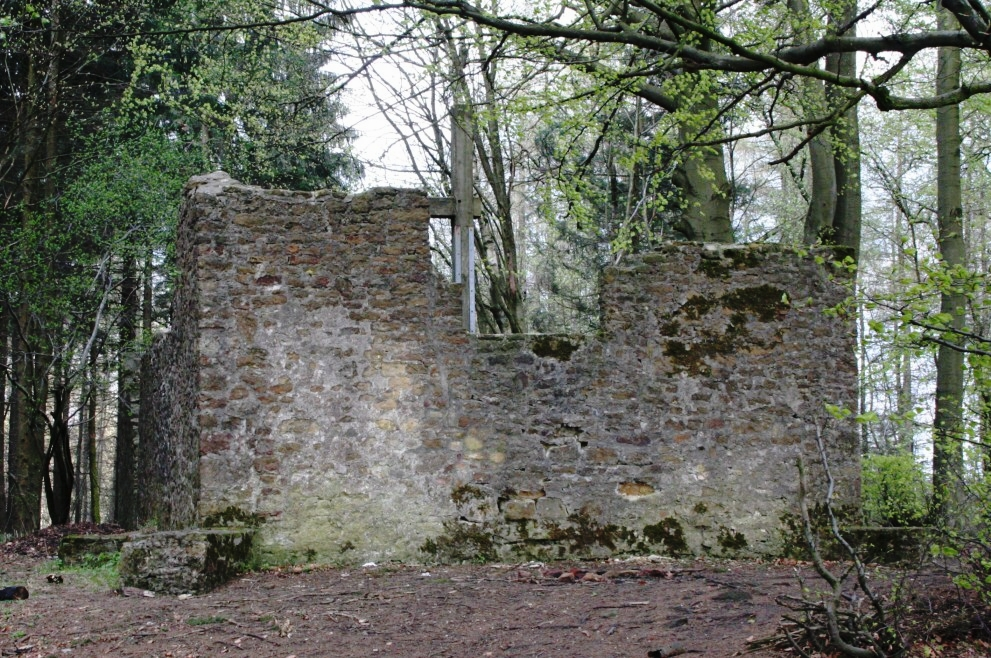
Hünenkapelle, old church in Oerlinghausen

== History and culture ==
First mentioned in documents in 1036, the town became a city in 1926 by authority of the Land of Lippe. In 1969 the city was expanded with the addition of Helpup, Währentrup and Lipperreihe as part of the "Gebietsreform" movement.

Oerlinghausen is home to an airfield which is one of Europe's largest gliding centres as well as the well known Archäologisches Freilichtmuseum Oerlinghausen (archaeological open-air museum) featuring reconstructions of a variety of dwellings spanning from 10,000 BC to 1000 AD.

The city has also been home to an unusual number of well-known sociologists. Marianne Weber (born Schnitger), who was born in Oerlinghausen and married Max Weber here in 1893, was a well-respected author herself. Niklas Luhmann and Richard Grathoff, two of the key sociologists who made the Bielefeld University one of the premier institutions for sociology in Europe, have also lived in Oerlinghausen for extended time periods.

Hanning Elektro-Werke is headquartered in Oerlinghausen.

== Population ==
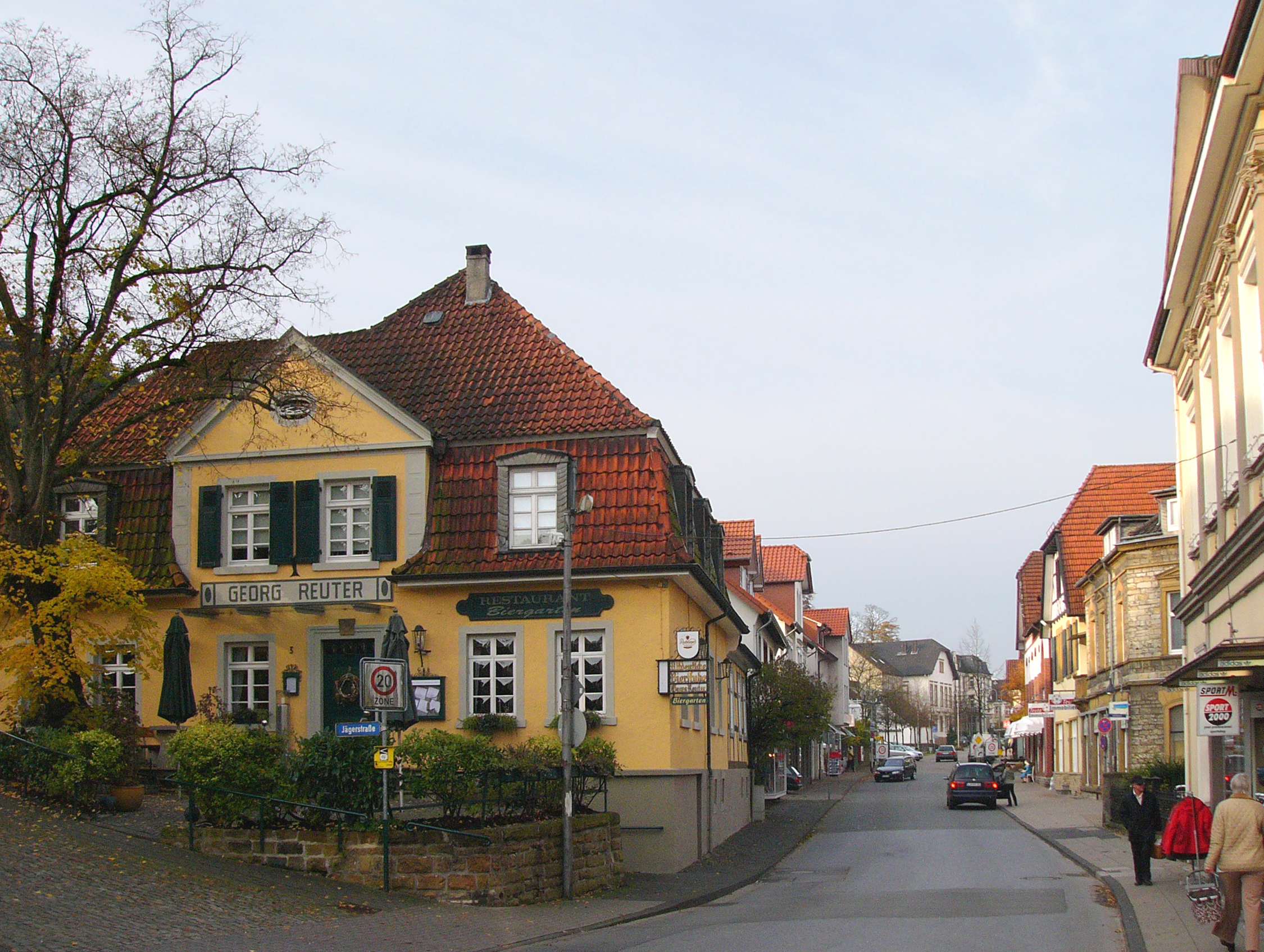
Main street

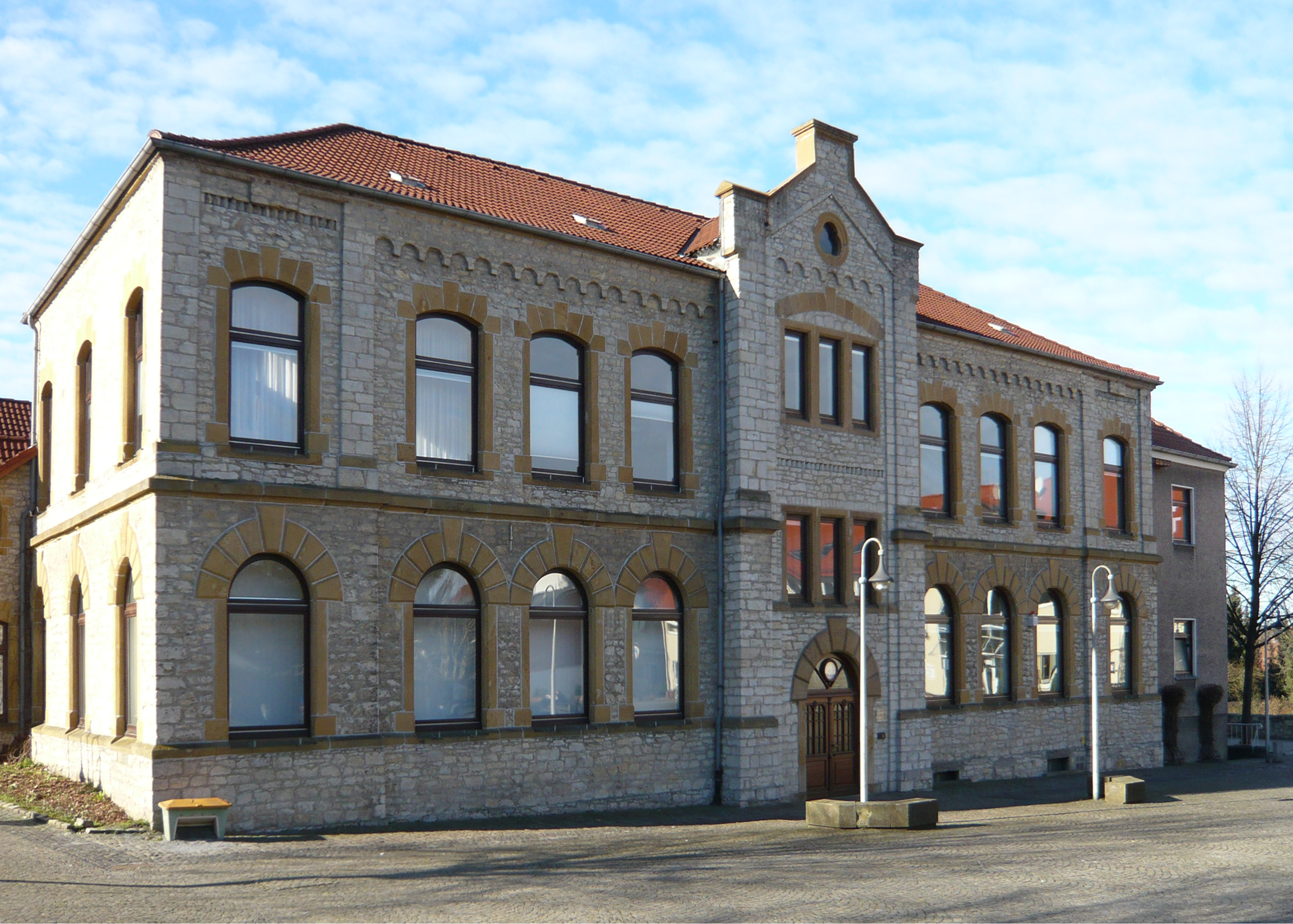
Town hall

Historical population

Year	Pop.	±% p.a.
1965	11,096	—
1970	13,440	+3.91%
1975	14,474	+1.49%
1980	14,751	+0.38%
1985	14,738	−0.02%
1990	15,689	+1.26%
1995	17,165	+1.81%

Year	Pop.	±% p.a.
2000	17,465	+0.35%
2005	17,305	−0.18%
2010	16,670	−0.74%
2015	17,616	+1.11%
2020	17,065	−0.63%
2025	17,302	+0.28%

Source: Landesdatabank Nordrhein-Westfalen

== Mayors ==
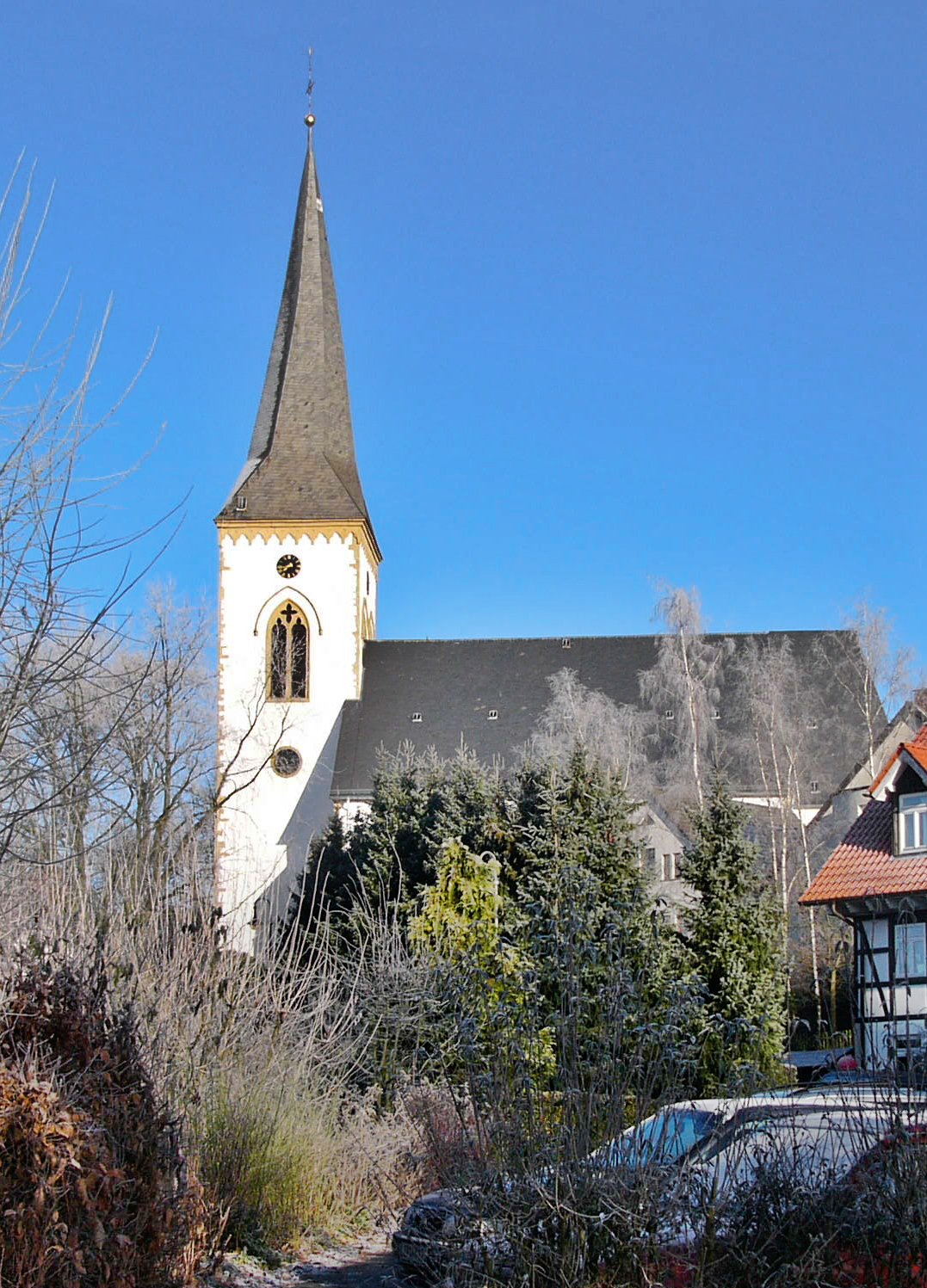
Alexander Church

Mayors of Oerlinghausen
Time of office	Name	Party
1926–1933	August Reuter	
1933–1945	Friedrich Möller	NSDAP
1945–1946	August Reuter	
1946–1965	Heinrich Kramer	SPD
1965–1969	Heinrich Schildmann	SPD
1969–1975	Konrad Dreckshage	FDP
1975–1984	Erich Diekhof	SPD
1984–1989	Horst Steinkühler	SPD
1989–1999	Martin Weber	SPD
1999–2015	Ursula Herbort	independent
2015–2025	Dirk Becker	SPD
since 2025	Peter Heepmann	SPD

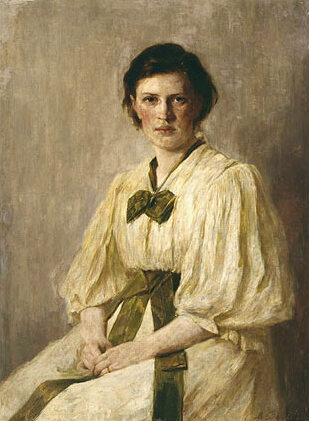
Marianne Weber, 1896

== Sons and daughters of the town ==
- Marianne Weber (born Schnitger) (1870–1954), lawyer, sociologist and legal historian
- Friedrich Bödeker (1867–1937), craftsman and cacti explorer
- Berthold Müller-Oerlinghausen (1893–1979), sculptor
- Andreas Ortmann (born 1953), economist
