= Berthold Müller-Oerlinghausen =

German sculptor (1893–1979)

Berthold Müller-Oerlinghausen (10 February 1893 in Oerlinghausen as Berthold Müller – 22 June 1979 in Kressbronn) was a German sculptor.

== Life and work ==
Born in Oerlinghausen near Bielefeld in 1893, Berthold Müller – he himself added Oerlinghausen to his name later – began his studies of sculpture under Hans Perathoner at the Bielefeld College of Arts and Crafts in 1910 while still a schoolboy. Completing his grammar school education in the classical humanities in Bielefeld in 1912, he moved to Berlin in 1914 and studied at the Charlottenburg School of Applied Arts. During the First World War he was conscripted for service with cavalry regiments in Russia, Galicia and France. In 1919 he was able to continue his interrupted studies in Berlin under Hans Perathoner and Willy Jäckel. In 1922, together with his wife, Jenny Wiegmann, he converted to Catholicism at the Abbey of Maria Laach. During the 1920s he devoted himself to religious art: commissions for sculptures on church buildings, participation in the “Exhibition of Religious Art” at the Ernst Arnold Gallery in Dresden and in the Vatican Mission Exhibition in the Holy Year of 1925 with his large sculpture “Pope Gregory the Great”. In 1929 he took part in the annual exhibition of the Berlin Secession and, in 1931, in the exhibitions of the Prussian Academy of Arts in Berlin. It was also in 1931 that he and his wife Jenny separated. Two years later, in 1933, he married Emily Sturm. In that same year he organized, and took part in, the Catholic section of the Exhibition of Ecclesiastical Art during the World's Fair in Chicago. From then on he spent the summer months mainly in Kressbronn on Lake Constance. In 1936 he founded a mosaic workshop in Berlin and, on 7 March of that same year, his son Bruno was born. He finally moved for long term to Kressbronn in 1940. His studio, mosaic workshop and apartment in Berlin were destroyed in an air raid in 1944. After 1945 Berthold Müller-Oerlinghausen made important contributions to a revival of the cultural life of the communities on Lake Constance: the rebuilding of his mosaic workshop in Kressbronn in 1946, exhibitions in the Municipal Museum of Lindau, the founding in 1947 of the “Upper Swabian Secession” (renamed “Secession of Upper Swabia/Lake Constance” in 1950), the founding of the “Artists’ Society of the Town and District of Lindau” (renamed “Lindau Art Patrons’ Society” in 1956), solo exhibitions at the Wessenberghaus in Constance and elsewhere, a retrospective exhibition at the Municipal Museum of Lindau in 1963 marking his 70th birthday. A monograph of the work of Berthold Müller-Oerlinghausen, written by Ulrich Gertz, was published in 1974. Berthold Müller-Oerlinghausen died in Kressbronn in 1979, too soon to receive the planned honorary title of professor from the State of Baden-Württemberg. A further monograph, written by Gisela Linder, was published in 1983, and a catalogue raisonné by Wolfgang Henze in 1990.

== Honours and distinctions ==
- Order of Merit of the Federal Republic of Germany 1968

== Exhibitions (selection) ==
- 1921: Kunstsalon Fischer, Bielefeld
- 1935: Galerie Ferdinand Möller, Berlin
- 1936: Städtisches Kunsthaus, Bielefeld
- 1943: Wessenberghaus, Constance
- 1946: Städtisches Museum, Lindau
- 1959: Bodensee-Museum, Friedrichshafen
- 1973: Bodensee-Museum, Friedrichshafen
- 1991: Galerie Schlichtenmaier, Grafenau
- 1999: Museum in der Lände, Kressbronn am Bodensee
- 2005: Galerie Bodenseekreis am Schlossplatz, Meersburg

== Bibliography ==
- Wolfgang Henze: Berthold Müller-Oerlinghausen – Das Gesamtwerk, published by Belser Verlag, Stuttgart/Zürich, 1990
- Andrea Dippel: Alle meine Freunde... – Der Bildhauer Berthold Müller-Oerlinghausen im Dialog mit Künstlern seiner Zeit, published by Verlag Robert Gessler, Friedrichshafen, 2005
- Ulrich Gertz: Berthold Müller-Oerlinghausen, der Bildhauer, published by Verlag Zollikofer & Co, St. Gallen, 1974
- Berthold Müller-Oerlinghausen: Vision und Wirklichkeit – Vorträge zur Bildenden Kunst 1928–1966, published by Verlag Robert Gessler, Friedrichshafen, 1993
- Gisela Linder: Der Bildhauer Berthold Müller-Oerlinghausen, published by Verlag Robert Gessler, Friedrichshafen, 1983
