= Lisa Wiik =

Norwegian snowboarder (born 1979)

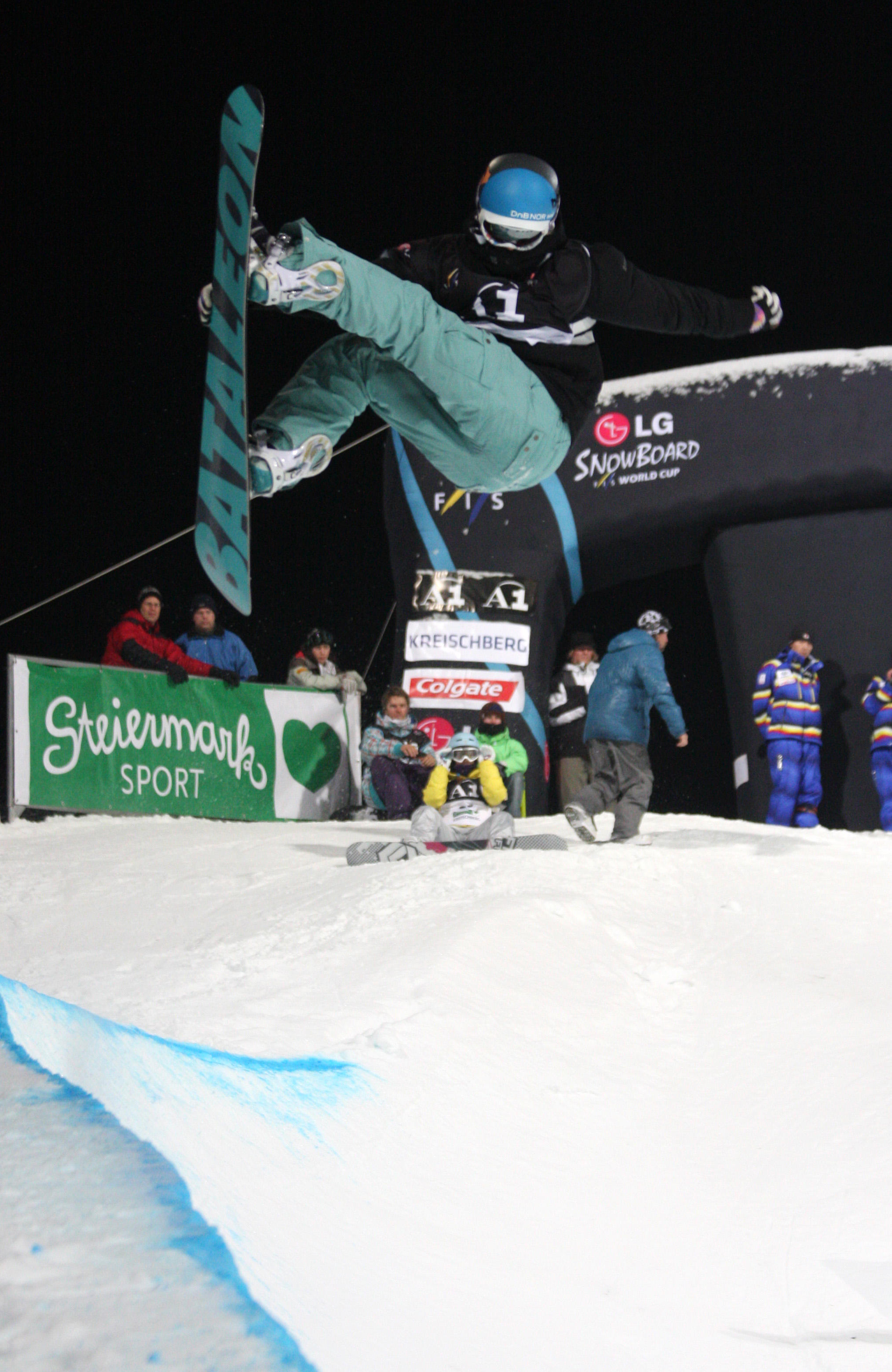

Lisa Therese Hegertun Wiik (born 5 October 1979) is a Norwegian snowboarder from Trondheim.

== Career ==
Wilk began competing on the Swatch TTR Tour in 1996. She finished tenth in the half pipe at the 2002 Winter Olympics. In 2008, she finished 11th on the Swatch TTR Ticket to Ride (World Snowboard Tour). In 2009, she finished 2nd on the Swatch TTR Ticket to Ride (World Snowboard Tour).

== Competition Results ==
Swatch TTR 2008/2009 Season

- 1st - Slopestyle - 6Star Burton European Open - Ticket to Ride (World Snowboard Tour)
- 7th - Halfpipe - 6Star Burton European Open - Ticket to Ride (World Snowboard Tour)
- 4th - Slopestyle - 5Star Burton Canadian Open - Ticket to Ride (World Snowboard Tour)
- 3rd - Halfpipe - 5Star Burton Canadian Open - Ticket to Ride (World Snowboard Tour)
- 9th - Halfpipe - 6Star Burton US Open - Ticket to Ride (World Snowboard Tour)
- 12th - Slopestyle - 6Star Burton US Open - Ticket to Ride (World Snowboard Tour)
- 5th - Halfpipe - 6Star Roxy Chicken Jam - Ticket to Ride (World Snowboard Tour)
- 3rd - Slopestyle - 6Star Roxy Chicken Jam - Ticket to Ride (World Snowboard Tour)
