= Marius Erlandsen =

Norwegian auto racing driver

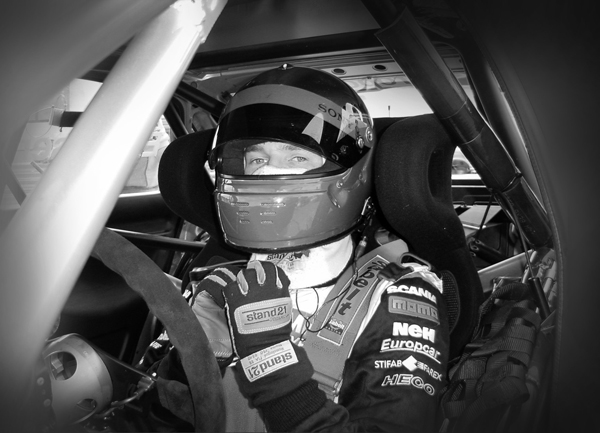

Marius Erlandsen (born 8 May 1979 in Mo i Rana, Norway) is a Norwegian auto racing driver. He has international experience from the British Formula Ford Championship, Swedish Touring Car Championship, and GT racing in a Porsche 911 GT3 RS. He won the Norwegian Standard Production Championship in 2008.

Erlandsen has worked at the Brands Hatch circuit as a racing instructor at the Nigel Mansell Racing School, teaching high-performance driving racecars such as Dodge Viper, Ferrari, Porsche and Lotus.
