= Einar Kalsæg =

Norwegian footballer (born 1979)

Personal information
- Date of birth: 13 January 1979 (age 47)
- Height: 1.80 m (5 ft 11 in)
- Position: Striker

Senior career*
Years	Team	Apps	(Gls)
–2003	Eidsvold Turn		
2004–2005	Kongsvinger		
2006–2007	Strømsgodset		
2007–2009	Moss		
2010	FK Tønsberg		
2011–2013	Lillehammer		

Managerial career
- 2011–?: Lillehammer (assistant coach)
- * Club domestic league appearances and goals

Einar Kalsæg (born 13 January 1979) is a retired Norwegian football striker.

He was a prolific goalscorer at Eidsvold Turn. Ahead of the 2004 season he joined Kongsvinger IL. In the summer of 2005 he was wanted by Strømsgodset IF, and after the season he moved there. He helped win promotion to the Norwegian Premier League, and got seven Norwegian Premier League games in 2007 without scoring. In August 2007 he was exchanged with Steffen Nystrøm, joining Moss FK. In 2010, he went on to FK Tønsberg, and in 2011 he became playing assistant coach of Lillehammer FK.
