= Morten Kolseth =

Norwegian footballer (born 1979)

Personal information
- Date of birth: 4 May 1979 (age 47)
- Height: 1.82 m (5 ft 11 1/2 in)
- Position: Defender

Senior career*
Years	Team	Apps	(Gls)
- Vadmyra
2000	Brann	2	(0)
2001	→ Løv-Ham (loan)		
- Åsane
–2004	Løv-Ham		
2005–2006	Askøy		
- * Club domestic league appearances and goals

Morten Kolseth (born 4 May 1979) is a retired Norwegian football defender.

He started his career in Vadmyra IL. He was in the squad of SK Brann in 2000, and played two Norwegian Premier League games that season. In the 2001 season he was sent on loan to Løv-Ham, and he later joined that club permanently. He also played for Åsane. Ahead of the 2005 season he joined Askøy FK. He left Askøy ahead of the 2007 season.
