= Lars Granaas =

Norwegian footballer (born 1979)

Lars Granaas (born 12 April 1979) is a Norwegian former professional footballer who played as a defender or midfielder for Mjøndalen IF.

== Career ==
Granaas debuted for Strømsgodset IF in 1997 as a promising young player, in November 1997, he had a trial at Manchester United. Since 1999 he was a first team regular, and he played a total of 214 matches and scored 16 goals for Strømsgodset. In 2006, his playing time with the first team was limited and he left Strømsgodset for Follo on 28 June 2006. In summer 2007 he returned from an injury to his hip bone. He signed for Mjøndalen IF after the 2008 season, which had been promoted to Adeccoligaen.

Granaas played 28 international matches for Norway on youth level, including nine matches for Norway U21.

== Career statistics ==
Appearances and goals by club, season and competition
Season	Club	League			Cup		Total	
Season	Club	Division	Apps	Goals	Apps	Goals	Apps	Goals
Mjøndalen	2009	Adeccoligaen	14	0	0	0	14	0
Mjøndalen	2010	Adeccoligaen	11	1	0	0	11	1
Mjøndalen	2011	Adeccoligaen	15	0	3	0	18	0
Mjøndalen	2012	Adeccoligaen	8	0	0	0	8	0
Career total			48	1	3	0	51	1
