= Brundtland =

Brundtland is a surname. Notable people with the surname include:

- Gro Harlem Brundtland (born 1939), 29th Prime Minister of Norway, Director-General of the World Health Organization
- Torbjørn Brundtland (born 1975), member of the duo Röyksopp

== See also ==
- Brundtland Commission, formally the World Commission on Environment and Development (WCED), convened by the United Nations in 1983
- First cabinet Brundtland, minority Labour Government of Norway
- Second cabinet Brundtland, minority Labour Government of Norway
- Third cabinet Brundtland, minority Labour Government of Norway
