= Ole Johan Singsdal =

Norwegian footballer (born 1979)

Johan Singsdal
Personal information
- Full name: Ole Johan Singsdal
- Date of birth: 8 May 1979 (age 47)
- Place of birth: Norway
- Height: 1.83 m (6 ft 0 in)
- Positions: Midfielder; attacking midfielder

Team information
- Current team: KIL/Hemne
- Number: 8

Senior career*
Years	Team	Apps	(Gls)
1995–1998	KIL/Hemne	54	(23)
1998–2001	Rosenborg	2	(0)
2000–2001	→ Byåsen (loan)	11	(2)
2001–2003	Byåsen	39	(8)
2003–	KIL/Hemne	54	(10)
- * Club domestic league appearances and goals

Ole Johan Singsdal (born 8 May 1979) is a Norwegian football (soccer) attacking midfielder, who plays for KIL/Hemne, the club where he started his career.

In 1998, he moved to Rosenborg BK, where he was mainly a backup player, making just 2 appearances in 3 years and in 2000 was loaned out to Byåsen IL. The move was made permanent a year later and Singsdal spent 2 seasons with the club and in 2003 joined the club where he plays now, KIL/Hemne.

== References / external links ==
- Rosenborg Web - Former player: Ole Johan Singsdal
- VG Nett - Ole Johan Singsdal
- KIL/Hemne Fotball - Ole Johan Singsdal
