= List of Norwegian sportspeople =

This is a list of people from Norway involved in sports or athletics.

== Summer/all-year ==
=== Association football ===
- Marius Aam, defender
- Magnus Aasbrenn, defender
- Paal Christian Alsaker, midfielder
- Henning Berg, defender, coach, and manager
- Tommy Bertheussen, goalkeeper
- Oscar Bobb, winger
- Daniel Braaten, winger
- Thomas Breivik, defender
- Gøran van den Burgt, midfielder
- John Carew, forward
- Lorenzo Caroprese, defender
- Nils Arne Eggen, defender, coach, and manager
- Mathias Eikenes, forward
- Herman Ekeberg, defender
- Robert Evensen, defender
- Hallgeir Finbråten, defender
- Tore André Flo, striker and youth coach
- Olav Førli, goalkeeper
- Morten Gamst Pedersen, winger
- Erling Haaland, striker
- Vebjørn Hagen, defender
- Espen Hagh, midfielder
- Trond Hansen, footballer, coach, and manager
- Endre Hansen, midfielder
- Ørjan Berg Hansen, defender
- Åge Hareide, defender, coach, and manager
- Ada Hegerberg, striker
- Isabell Herlovsen, midfielder and striker
- Øystein Hesjedal, defender
- Ulf Karlsen, defender
- Jørn Karlsrud, midfielder
- Edwin Kjeldner, midfielder
- Morten Kolseth, defender
- Øyvind Leonhardsen, midfielder
- Johan Martin Lianes, goalkeeper
- Atle Maurud, striker
- Marcus Melchior, midfielder
- Aurora Mikalsen, goalkeeper
- John Ole Moe, goalkeeper
- Torger Motland, striker
- Thomas Myhre, goalkeeper
- Colin N'kee, forward
- Erik Noppi, defender
- Gunnar Norebø, midfielder
- Jan Økern, footballer
- Egil "Drillo" Olsen, winger, coach and manager
- Morten-André Olsen, goalkeeper
- Jan Petter Olsen, striker
- Helge Øvreberg, defender
- Lars Øvrebø, midfielder
- Arild Rebne, midfielder
- Kjetil Rekdal, midfielder, coach, and manager
- Guro Reiten, midfielder
- Bjørn Helge Riise, midfielder
- Hege Riise, Olympic footballer
- John Arne Riise, left back and midfielder
- Karl Erik Rimfeldt, defender
- Ludvig Rinde, defender
- Torgeir Rugtvedt, defender
- Tommy Runar, goalkeeper
- Pål Rustadstuen, midfielder
- Vegard Sannes, midfielder
- Espen Skistad, goalkeeper
- Iver Sletten, striker
- Trond Sollied, defender and manager
- Ole Gunnar Solskjær, forward and manager
- Lars Sørlien, midfielder
- Tim Henrik Sperrevik, forward
- Jens Petter Stang, defender
- Ronny Støbakk, midfielder
- Pål Anders Stubsveen, footballer
- Geir Sundal, defender
- Tor Sveen, striker
- Erik Thorstvedt, goalkeeper
- Thomas Tøllefsen, goalkeeper
- Finn-Georg Tomulevski, defender
- Frank Tønnesen, defender
- Kenneth Trones, defender
- Leif Tsolis, coach
- Øystein Vetti, defender
- Trond Vinterstø, defender
- Morten Wivestad, defender
- Martin Ødegaard, midfielder

=== Handball ===
- Ane Eidem, right back
- Sebastian Barthold, left wing
- Are Grongstad, handballer
- Birgitte Karlsen Hagen, left back
- Anja Hammerseng-Edin, central back
- Gro Hammerseng-Edin, Olympian, center back
- André Jørgensen, left back
- Kristian Kjelling, left back
- Lars Nordberg, back player
- Inga Berit Svestad, right wing
- Hermann Vildalen, left back
- Katrine Lunde, goalkeeper

=== Rowing ===
- Alf Hansen, rower
- Frank Hansen, rower
- Olaf Tufte, rower

=== Running ===
- Mensen Ernst, long distance
- Filip Ingebrigtsen, middle distance
- Henrik Ingebrigtsen, middle distance
- Jakob Ingebrigtsen, middle distance
- Ingrid Kristiansen, long distance
- Christina Vukicevic, hurdle race
- Grete Waitz, long distance
- Susanne Wigene, middle and long distance

=== Other ===
- Simen Agdestein, chess player
- Bea Ballintijn, swimmer at the 1948 Summer Olympics
- Asbjørn Berg-Hansen, flyweight boxer
- Edvald Boasson Hagen, cyclist
- Henrik Bjørnstad, golfer
- Kristian Blummenfelt, triathlete
- Cecilia Brækhus, boxer
- Magnus Carlsen, World chess champion
- Rune Dalsjø, rally driver
- Egil Danielsen, javelin thrower, Olympian
- Trygve Diskerud, harness racer
- Gunn-Rita Dahle Flesjå, mountain biker, Olympian
- Ailo Gaup, FMX motorcyclist
- Stian Grimseth, weightlifter
- Bente Grønli, multiple Paralympic medallist in swimming and ice sledge racing
- Kjell Håkonsen, harness racing coachman
- Gustav Iden, triathlete
- Jon Ludvig Hammer, chess player
- Joachim Hansen, MMA fighter
- Harald V of Norway, yacht sailor, Olympian
- Trine Hattestad, javelin thrower
- Dennis Hauger, racing driver
- Knut Holmann, kayaker
- Viktor Hovland, golfer
- Anne Sophie Hunstad, javelin thrower
- Thor Hushovd, cyclist
- Nila Håkedal, beach volleyball player
- Richard Ordemann, taekwondo athlete
- Suzann "Tutta" Pettersen, golfer
- Bartosz Piasecki, fencer
- Kjersti Plätzer, race walker
- Knute Rockne, American college football coach
- Jon Rønningen, wrestler
- Casper Ruud, tennis player
- Henning Solberg, rally driver
- Petter Solberg, rally driver
- Jan Stenerud, American football kicker
- Casper Stornes, triathlete
- Steffen Tangstad, heavy weight boxer
- Andreas Thorkildsen, javelin thrower
- Sune Wentzel, flying disc athlete
- Babe Didriksen Zaharias, Olympic athlete and LPGA golfer

== Winter sports ==
=== Curling ===
- Linn Githmark, curler
- Dordi Nordby, curler
- Pål Trulsen, curler
- Thomas Ulsrud, curler

=== Ice hockey ===
- Mats Zuccarello (born 1987), winger
- Jørn Goldstein (born 1953), goalie, player at the 1984 Winter Olympics
- Espen "Shampoo" Knutsen (born 1972), retired centre, now manager
- Patrick Thoresen (born 1983), winger, player at the 2010 and 2014 Winter Olympics
- Ole-Kristian Tollefsen (born 1984), defenceman, player at the 2010 Winter Olympics
- Tore Vikingstad (born 1975), retired centre

=== Skiing ===
- Hans Anton Aalien, blind cross-country skier
- Finn Aamodt, former head coach of the Norwegian alpine skiing team
- Kjetil André Aamodt, alpine skier
- Geir Ludvig Aasen Ouren, cross-country skier
- Thomas Alsgaard, cross-country skier
- Berit Aunli, cross-country skier
- Anders Bardal, ski jumper, Olympic Team Bronze Medal
- Marit Bjørgen, cross-country skier
- Oddvar Brå, cross-country skier
- Espen Bredesen, ski jumper
- Bjørn Dæhlie, cross-country skier
- Bjørn Einar Romøren, ski jumper
- Stein Eriksen, alpine skier
- Frode Estil, cross-country skier
- Johan Remen Evensen, ski jumper, Olympic Team Bronze Medal
- Kristin Fridtun, ski jumper
- Tord Asle Gjerdalen, cross-country skier
- Kim-Roar Hansen, ski jumper
- Tom Hilde, ski jumper, Olympic Team Bronze Medal
- Odd-Bjørn Hjelmeset, cross-country skier
- Anders Jacobsen, ski jumper, Olympic Team Bronze Medal
- Lasse Kjus, alpine skier
- Frode Lillefjell, cross-country skier and coach
- Roar Ljøkelsøy, ski jumper
- Ingolf Mork, ski jumper
- Sondre Norheim, pioneering alpine skier
- Petter Northug, double Olympic Gold cross- country skier
- Simen Østensen, cross-country skier
- Hilde G. Pedersen, cross-country skier
- Øystein Pettersen, cross-country skier
- Sigurd Pettersen, ski jumper
- Kathrine Rokke, cross-country skier
- Birger Ruud, ski jumper
- Oddvar Saga, ski jumper
- Bente Skari, cross-country skier
- Kristen Skjeldal, cross-country skier
- Vegard Sklett, ski jumper
- Herman Smith-Johannsen, supercentenarian Norwegian-Canadian skiing pioneer
- John A. "Snowshoe" Thompson, Norwegian-American skiing pioneer
- Ole Martin Storlien, Nordic combined skier
- Kari Traa, freestyle skier
- Vegard Ulvang, cross-country skier
- Bjørn Wirkola, ski jumper
- Therese Johaug, cross-country skier,four-time Olimpic gold medalist

=== Snowboarding ===
- Kjersti Buaas, bronze medal at the 2006 Winter Olympics women's competition
- Daniel Franck, silver medal at the 1998 Winter Olympics men's competition
- Terje Håkonsen, professional freestyle snowboarder active in the 1990s
- Torstein Horgmo, professional snowboarder
- Stine Brun Kjeldaas, silver medal at the 1998 Winter Olympics women's competition
- Silje Norendal, professional snowboarder, participant at the 2014 Winter Olympics

=== Speed skating ===
- Roald Aas
- Hjalmar Andersen
- Ivar Ballangrud
- Eskil Ervik
- Bernt Evensen
- Rolf Falk-Larssen
- Sverre Farstad
- Per Willy Guttormsen
- Øystein Grødum
- Finn Helgesen
- Bjørg Eva Jensen
- Knut Johannesen
- Geir Karlstad
- Johann Olav Koss
- Fred Anton Maier
- Oscar Mathisen
- Per Ivar Moe
- Sten Stensen
- Jan Egil Storholt
- Ådne Søndrål
- Magne Thomassen
- Even Wetten

=== Other ===
- Ole Einar Bjørndalen, biathlete
- Sonja Henie, figure skater and movie star
- Tore Johannessen, president of the Norwegian Ice Hockey Association
- Axel Paulsen, figure skater
- Liv Grete Skjelbreid Poirée, biathlete
- Robert Sørlie, dogsled racer

== See also ==
- Lists of sportspeople
