= Hjernevask =

- Title card
- Genre: Documentary miniseries
- Created by: Harald Eia; Ole-Martin Ihle
- Country of origin: Norway
- Original language: Norwegian
- No. of seasons: 1
- No. of episodes: 7

Production
- Running time: 40 minutes

Original release
- Network: NRK1
- Release: 1 March – 19 April 2010

Hjernevask ("Brainwash") is a Norwegian documentary miniseries about science that aired on NRK1 in 2010. The series, consisting of seven episodes, was created for NRK and presented by the comedian and sociologist Harald Eia.

The series contrasted cultural determinist models of human behavior (also referred to as the Standard social science model) with nature-nurture interactionist perspectives. In support of the cultural determinist perspective it interviewed mainly Norwegian humanities scholars, in particular literary theorist Jørgen Lorentzen at the Centre for Gender Research. Experts interviewed for the series in support of a nature-nurture interactionist perspective included Simon Baron-Cohen, Steven Pinker, Simon LeVay, David Buss, Glenn Wilson, Robert Plomin and Anne Campbell. This ignited a wide public discussion on the subject of the nature versus nurture debate, and especially focused on the views expressed by Lorentzen. The entire series has since been released online.

== Objectives and awards ==
Eia and coproducer Ole Martin Ihle have named Steven Pinker's book The Blank Slate as an inspiration for the documentary series. The series was a huge success, and Eia was awarded the Fritt Ord Award for "having precipitated one of the most heated debates on research in recent times".

== Episodes ==
The producers have made the series available online. Episodes linked in the external links have English subtitles available.

Episode number	Title	Description	Participants	Air date
1	The Gender Equality Paradox	Why do girls tend to go into empathizing professions and boys into systemizing professions? Why does the labor market become more gender segregated the more economic prosperity a country has?	Anniken Huitfeldt, Jørgen Lorentzen, Cathrine Egeland, Camilla Schreiner, Simon Baron-Cohen, Richard Lippa, Anne Campbell, Trond Diseth	1 March 2010
2	The Parental Effect	How much influence do parents really have on their children? To what degree is intelligence inherited?	Gudmund Hernes, Willy Pedersen, Judith Rich Harris, Hans Olav Tungesvik, Robert Plomin	8 March 2010
3	Gay/Straight	To what extent is sexual preference innate? Are there differences between heterosexuals and homosexuals? Is homosexuality a result of a choice or is it innate?	Sturla Berg Johansen, Thomas Folkestad, Jørgen Lorentzen, Agnes Bolsø, Nils Axel Nissen, Gerulf Rieger, Ricard Lippa, Simon LeVay, Arve Sørum, Glenn Wilson	15 March 2010
4	Violence	Are people from some cultures more aggressive than others?	Hedda Giertsen, Richard Nisbett, Erling Sandmo, Ingvild Forbord, Marit Clementz, Steven Pinker, Ragnhild Bjørnebekk, Inger Lise Lien, David Buss	22 March 2010
5	Sex	Are there biological reasons men have a greater tendency than women to want sex without obligation?	Willy Pedersen, Jørgen Lorentzen, Leif Edward Ottesen Kennair, Anne Campbell, Gro Isachsen, Martine Aurdal, Richard Lippa, David Buss	5 April 2010
6	Race	Are there significant genetic differences between different peoples?	Trond Thorbjørnsen, Knut Olav Åmås, Cathrine Sandnes, Gregory Cochran, Charles Murray, Richard Nisbett, Richard Lynn.	12 April 2010
7	Nature or Nurture	Is personality acquired or inherited?	Jørgen Lorentzen, Knut Olav Åmås, Agnes Bolsø, Trond H. Diseth, Nils Axel Nissen, Martine Aurdal, Hedda Giertsen, Cathrine Egeland, Tom Colbjørnsen, Simon Baron-Cohen, Steven Pinker, Leif Edward Ottesen Kennair, Philip Skau, Vigdis Bunkholdt, Simon LeVay.	19 April 2010

== Reception ==
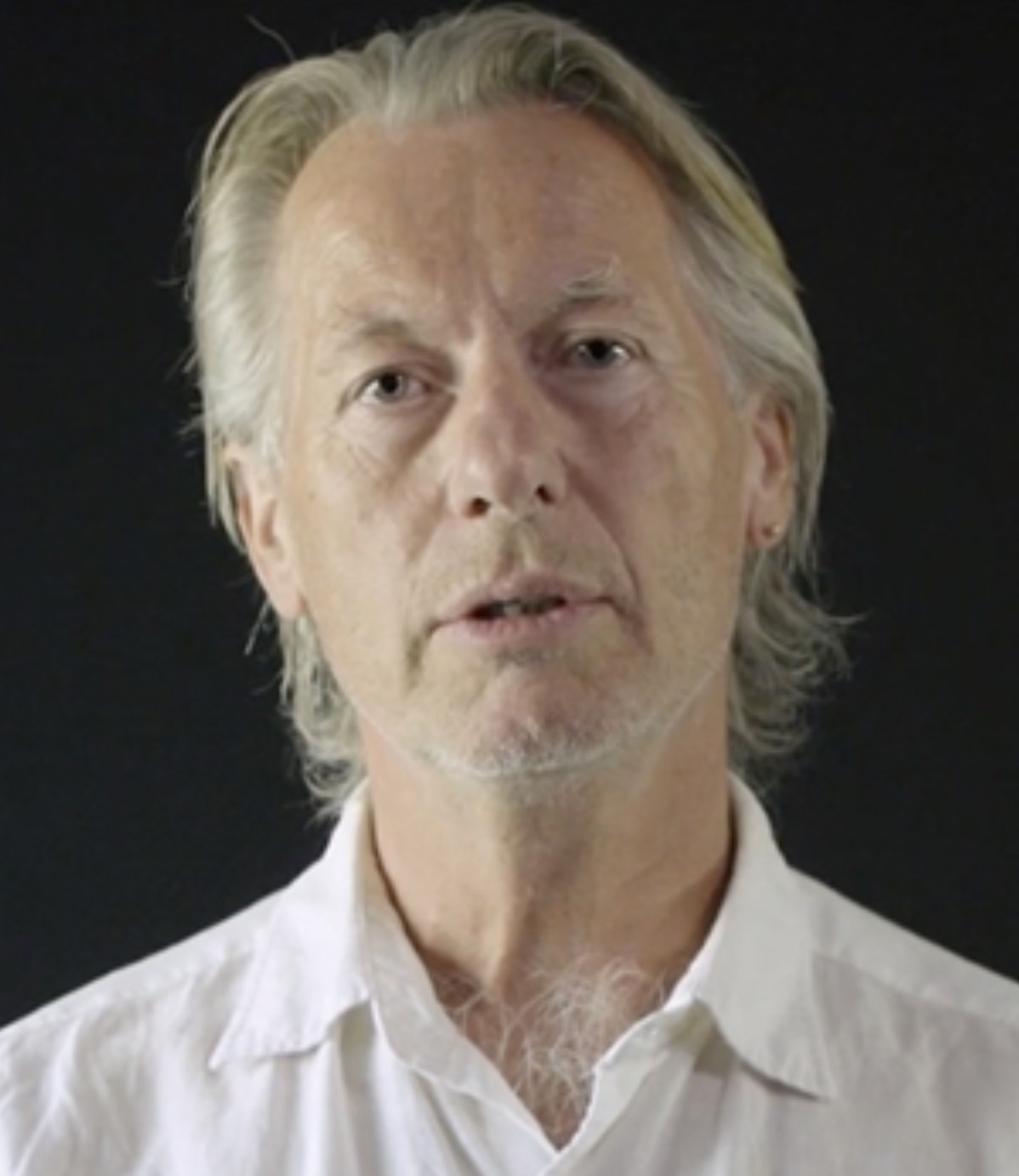
Literary scholar Jørgen Lorentzen at the Centre for Gender Research was featured in many of the episodes.

Hjernevask led to extensive public debate, largely focused on the views expressed in the program by literary scholar Jørgen Lorentzen at the Centre for Gender Research. Lorentzen's description of the research of psychologists Simon Baron-Cohen, Anne Campbell and Richard Lippa as "weak science" was strongly criticized by many commentators; biologist Trond Amundsen pointed out that Lorentzen's work was cited less than 30 times in academic literature and responded that "the characteristic 'weak science' would be rude and uncollegial if Lorentzen was a leading international expert and the three researchers were in fact not so meritorious. But all three are meritorious international researchers [...] against this background, the statement is just embarrassing."

Lorentzen accused his critics including "Ottar Brox, Øyvind Østerud, Stig Frøland, Kristian Gundersen, Tor K. Larsen and others" of being "cowardly hyenas" who have shown "neither insight into nor interest in gender research." Lorentzen also accused series creator Eia of being motivated by a midlife crisis. Eia pointed out that Lorentzen has a very limited scholarly impact with few international publications and a very low number of citations, and said that he wouldn't have interviewed Lorentzen for the series if he had known at the time that Lorentzen was "such a low-level researcher." Jon Hustad accused Lorentzen of being "blinded by ideology." In response to claims by Lorentzen that NRK had portrayed him unfairly and misrepresented his comments, NRK made all the raw footage available. Lorentzen complained to the Norwegian Press Complaints Commission (PFU). In June 2010 PFU concluded that NRK had not violated press ethics or portrayed Lorentzen in an unfair manner; the chairman of PFU described Hjernevask as a "solid work" of investigative journalism. Eia received the 2010 Fritt Ord Honorary Award for the series.

Several years after Hjernevask aired, it was reported that it has been used in Eastern Europe to promote false claims that all gender studies research in Norway has been closed down in its aftermath; Harald Eia commented that he did not make Hjernevask for a Hungarian audience, and that he wanted to showcase the arrogance he felt Lorentzen displayed towards other research fields for a Norwegian audience.
