= Jørgen Lorentzen =

Norwegian literary scholar (born 1956)

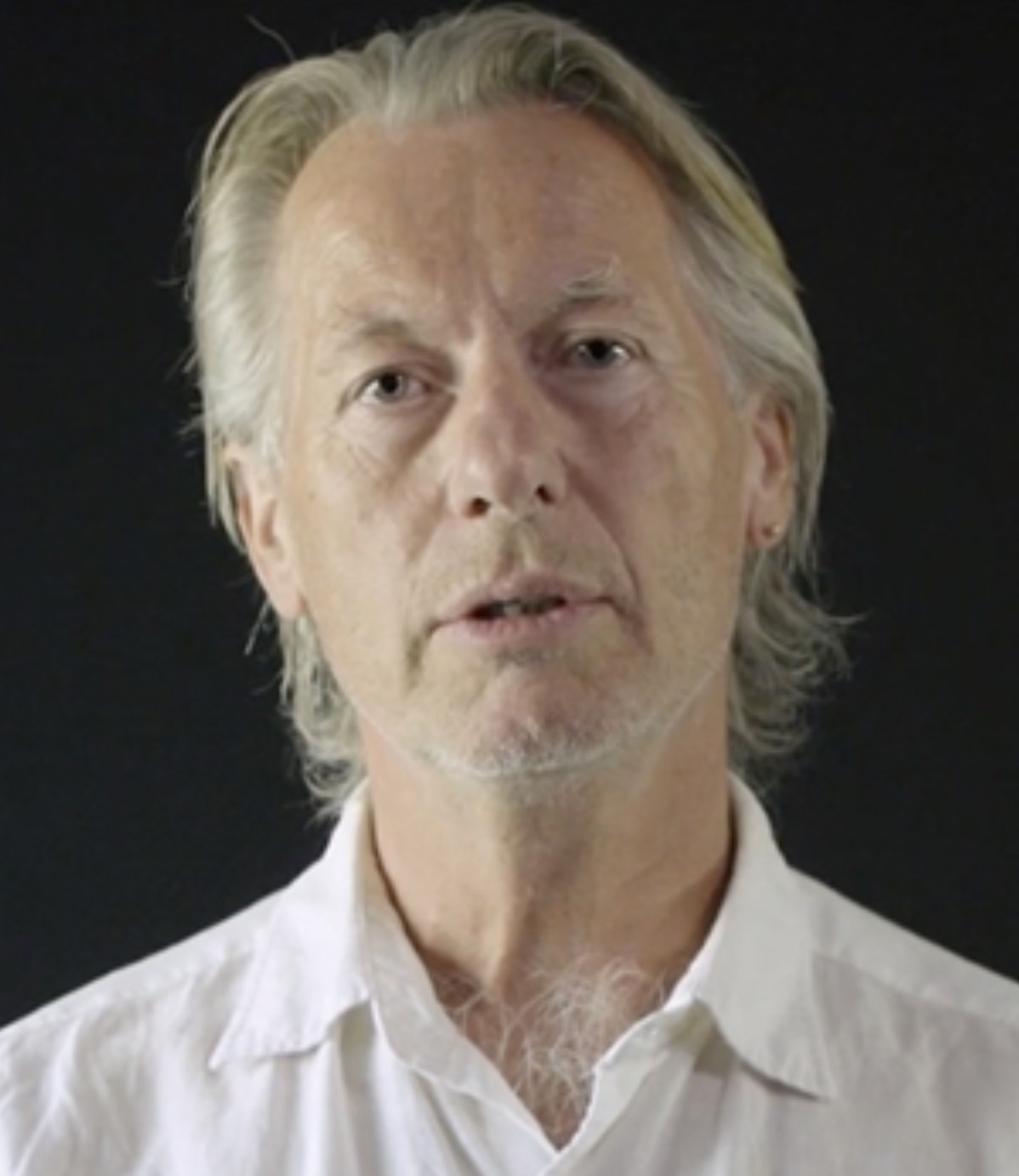
Jørgen Lorentzen

Jørgen Lorentzen (born 4 November 1956) is a Norwegian literary scholar and independent film producer. His research has focused on the representation of men and masculinities in literature, film and popular culture. He became known to a broad audience through his participation in the TV program Hjernevask in 2010. He was employed as a researcher at the Centre for Gender Research in Oslo until 2013, and has since been a freelance researcher and documentary film producer.

== Career ==
Lorentzen studied literature and worked as a journalist and editor at a publishing company during his early career. In 1997 he earned a doctoral degree in literature with the dissertation Mannlighetens muligheter on male characters in the works of Knut Hamsun, August Strindberg and Arne Garborg. He was an acting lecturer in literature at the Department of Nordic Studies and Literature at the University of Oslo from 1994 to 1995, an acting associate professor at the department from 1997 to 1998 and a researcher at the department from 1999 to 2000 on a short-term project on the literature of Herman Bang. From 2002 to 2013 he was a postdoctoral researcher, researcher and briefly (2006–2007) an acting associate professor at the university's Centre for Women's and Gender Studies (later the Centre for Gender Research), primarily working on two externally funded projects on the cultural history of fatherhood in Norway since 1850 and on "public intimacies", the latter a collaboration with media studies scholar and queer theorist Wencke Mühleisen. Lorentzen was most recently employed as a researcher and left the university in 2013 when his externally funded project had concluded.

In addition to his doctoral dissertation, Lorentzen has published several articles and book chapters on fathers in Norwegian history and literary history. The article "Ibsen and Fatherhood" (New Literary History, 2006) addresses father figures in Henrik Ibsen's works. The theoretical article "Masculinities and the Phenomenology of Men's Orgasms" (Men and Masculinities, 2007), his most cited work, argues for a new male sexual ethics based on "the penis as a bridge from me to you". The article was critiqued by biologists in 2010. Lorentzen has also written several popular science books in his fields, including Maskulinitet: blikk på mannen gjennom litteratur og film on the representation of masculinity in literature and film. As of 2021, Lorentzen's works were cited around 400 times according to Google Scholar.

Lorentzen has been involved in the men's movement and has been a board member and vice chair of the organization Reform ressurssenter for menn, that aims to "make men visible as gender in society" and that has been criticized by feminists for promoting the sex industry. A 2008 book by Maud Eduards and other Swedish gender studies scholars included a critical analysis of Lorentzen in a chapter titled "Bättre med män" [Men are better]; in the chapter Lorentzen, referred to pseudonymously as "Tore," was portrayed as a man "whose only mission was to disparage feminist scholarship while craving more money for himself." Lorentzen responded in an article in Klassekampen where he admitted to be "Tore," called the book "fascinating" and accused his critics of maintaining a "stifling consensus".

In 2013 Lorentzen offered his analysis of Anders Behring Breivik's anti-feminism, a topic that had previously been commented upon by several other scholars.

=== Public debates ===
Lorentzen is known in Norway for his participation in several public debates. In 2007 he called for a ban on circumcision, which he described as a "bestial practice" and compared to female genital mutilation.

In 2008 he was involved in a debate over the parental leave period against psychologists Leif Edward Ottesen Kennair and Turid Suzanne Berg Nielsen, and human biologist Terje Bongard. He accused his opponents of being engaged in "bio fascism" and "psycho nonsense", of having "no knowledge of gender" and called for them to "abdicate as researchers". Law professor Olav Torvund noted that Lorentzen seems to have introduced the term "bio fascism" in Norwegian discourse.

==== Hjernevask ====
In 2010 Lorentzen came to broad public attention through his participation in NRK's TV documentary series Hjernevask, presented by sociologist and comedian Harald Eia. In the program Lorentzen made critical comments about the research of psychologists including Simon Baron-Cohen and Anne Campbell which he described as "weak science". Lorentzen was widely criticized for his comments. Biologist Trond Amundsen noted that Lorentzen was cited less than 30 times in academic literature and responded that "the characteristic 'weak science' would be rude and uncollegial if Lorentzen was a leading international expert and the three researchers were in fact not so meritorious. But all three are meritorious international researchers [...] against this background, the statement is just embarrassing."

After Hjernevask aired, Lorentzen participated extensively in public debate over the program and accused his critics including "Ottar Brox, Øyvind Østerud, Stig Frøland, Kristian Gundersen, Tor K. Larsen and others" of being "cowardly hyenas" who have shown "neither insight into nor interest in gender research." Lorentzen also accused series creator Eia of being motivated by a midlife crisis. Eia pointed out that Lorentzen has a very limited scholarly impact with few international publications and a very low number of citations, and said that he wouldn’t have interviewed Lorentzen for the series if he had known at the time that Lorentzen was "such a low-level researcher." Jon Hustad accused Lorentzen of being "blinded by ideology." In response to claims by Lorentzen that NRK had portrayed him unfairly and misrepresented his comments, NRK made all the raw footage available. Lorentzen complained to the Norwegian Press Complaints Commission (PFU). In June 2010 PFU concluded that NRK had not violated press ethics or portrayed Lorentzen in an unfair manner; the chairman of PFU described Hjernevask as a "solid work" of investigative journalism. Eia received the 2010 Fritt Ord Honorary Award for the series.

Several years after Hjernevask aired, it was reported that it has been used in Eastern Europe to promote false claims that all gender studies research in Norway has been closed down in its aftermath; Harald Eia commented that he did not make Hjernevask for a Hungarian audience, and that he wanted to showcase the arrogance he felt Lorentzen displayed towards other research fields.

=== Later work ===
After leaving academia in 2013, Lorentzen was the CEO of the Hedda Foundation (Norwegian: Stiftelsen Hedda), that existed from 2013 to 2019 and that focused on artistic projects related to equality, human rights and democracy; the foundation had two employees including himself until 2016, when it lost its funding, and it was dissolved in 2019 after a period of inactivity. From 2016 Lorentzen has primarily been active as a film producer, and he has produced several independent documentaries directed by his wife, film director Nefise Özkal Lorentzen. Together they run the film production company Integralfilm. He has been active in debating democratic backsliding in Turkey and is a critic of Erdoğan's government. From 2019 Lorentzen is a member of the municipal council of Nesodden, representing the Labour Party.
