= Trond (name) =

- Gender: Male
- Language: Norway (Trond); Faroe Islands (Tróndur)
- Name day: 21 September

Origin
- Meaning: "To grow and thrive", Trønder

Other names
- Alternative spelling: Tron, Tronn, Thron, Thrond
- Related names: Tronda (female)

Trond is a Norwegian male given name. The base of the name, Tron'r (Þróndr or Þrándr), is Old Norse and means "to grow and thrive" (þroásk). 17785 people in Norway have Trond as their first name, making it the 23rd most used name (2008). The name is connected to one of the largest subgroups of Norwegians, the Trønders of Trøndelag, but also in connection with people from Trondheim.

The name Trond may refer to:

== People ==
- Trond Abrahamsen (born 1960), Norwegian ice hockey player
- Trond Amundsen (born 1957), Norwegian biologist
- Trond Amundsen (born 1971), Norwegian football coach
- Trond Andersen (born 1975), Norwegian footballer
- Trond Andresen (born 1947), Norwegian engineer and political activist
- Trond Fausa Aurvåg (born 1972), Norwegian actor
- Trond Barthel (born 1970), Norwegian pole vaulter
- Trond Berg (born 1934), Norwegian cell physiologist
- Trond Bergh (born 1946), Norwegian historian
- Trond Bersu (born 1984), Norwegian drummer and producer
- Trond Erik Bertelsen (born 1984), Norwegian footballer
- Trond Birkedal (born 1980), Norwegian politician
- Trond Bjørndal (born 1969), Norwegian footballer and coach
- Trond André Bolle (1968–2010), Norwegian military officer
- Trond Brænne (1953–2013), Norwegian actor and writer
- Trond Bråthen (1977–2012), Norwegian musician
- Trond-Arne Bredesen (born 1967), Norwegian Nordic combined skier
- Trond H. Diseth (born 1957), Norwegian child psychiatrist
- Trond Dolva (1934–2022), Norwegian judge
- Trond Einar Elden (born 1970), Norwegian skier
- Trond Eliassen (1922–2024), Norwegian architect
- Trond Berg Eriksen (born 1945), Norwegian historian
- Trond Fevolden (born 1951), Norwegian civil servant
- Trond Frønes (born 1978), Norwegian musician
- Trond Giske (born 1966), Norwegian politician
- Trond Granlund (born 1950), Norwegian singer and guitarist
- Trond Inge Haugland (born 1976), Norwegian footballer
- Trond Heggestad (born 1978), Norwegian footballer
- Trond Hegna (1898–1992), Norwegian journalist and politician
- Trond Heir (born 1958), Norwegian psychiatrist and military physician
- Trond Helleland (born 1962), Norwegian politician
- Trond Henriksen (born 1964), Norwegian footballer and coach
- Trond Høiby (born 1973), Norwegian decathlete
- Trond Iversen (born 1976), Norwegian cross-country skier
- Trond Jensrud (born 1968), Norwegian politician
- Trond Kirkvaag (1946–2007), Norwegian comedian and actor
- Trond Kjøll (born 1953), Norwegian rifle shooter and coach
- Trond Kverno (born 1945), Norwegian composer
- Trond Lode (born 1974), Norwegian politician
- Trond Lykke (1946–2020), Norwegian merchant
- Trond Fredrik Ludvigsen (born 1982), Norwegian footballer
- Trond Magnussen (born 1973), Norwegian ice hockey player
- Trond Martiniussen (born 1945), Norwegian wrestler
- Trond Mohn (born 1943), Norwegian businessman
- Trond Peter Stamsø Munch (born 1960), Norwegian actor
- Trond Nilssen (born 1990), Norwegian actor
- Trond Nordby (born 1943), Norwegian historian and political scientist
- Trond Nordseth (born 1974), Norwegian footballer
- Trond Nymark (born 1976), Norwegian race walker
- Trond Olsen (born 1984), Norwegian footballer
- Trond Einar Pedersli, Norwegian orienteer
- Trond Jøran Pedersen (born 1958), Norwegian ski jumper
- Trond Pedersen (born 1951), Norwegian footballer
- Trond Reinertsen (born 1945), Norwegian economist and businessman
- Trond Reinholdtsen (born 1972), Norwegian composer and vocalist
- Trond Espen Seim (born 1971), Norwegian actor
- Trond Sirevåg (born 1955), Norwegian footballer and football manager
- Trond Skramstad (born 1960), Norwegian decathlete
- Trond Soleng (born 1973), Norwegian footballer
- Trond Sollied (born 1959), Norwegian footballer and manager
- Trond Egil Soltvedt (born 1967), Norwegian footballer
- Trond Strande (born 1970), Norwegian footballer and coach
- Trond Viggo Toresen (born 1978), Norwegian footballer
- Trond Helge Torsvik (born 1957), Norwegian geophysicsist
- Trond Trondsen (born 1994), Norwegian cyclist
- Trond Vinterstø (born 1973), Norwegian footballer
- Trond Waage (born 1953), Norwegian child rights expert

== See also ==
- Tron (disambiguation)
