= Carl-Eric =

Carl-Eric or Carl Eric may refer to:

- Carl Eric Almgren (1913–2001), a Swedish Army general
- Carl-Eric Björkegren (born 1920), a Swedish director, art collector, and businessman
- Carl-Eric Bulow, a Swedish table tennis player
- Carl Eric Bechhofer Roberts (1894–1949), British author, barrister and journalist
- Carl Eric Stålberg (born 1951), a Swedish businessman
- Carl-Eric Vanderborght (born 1951), a Belgian field hockey player
- Carl Eric Wickman (1887–1954), Swedish-born businessman, founder of Greyhound Lines

== See also ==
- Karl-Erik
