= Sorlien =

Sorlien or Sørlien is a surname. Notable people with the surname include:

- Lars Sørlien (born 1980), Norwegian footballer
- Richard Sorlien (1922–2008), American lawyer and tennis player
