= Grøva family =

Norwegian noble family

Grøva
- Noble family
- Country: Norway
- Etymology: Pits, holes (in landscape); indef. pl. of Old Norse grǫf, comp. grǫftr
- Origin: Helgeland
- Founded: 1400; 626 years ago
- Founder: Trond
- Connected families: Archbishop of Nidaros; Kruse family Kusse family (Arnmødling dynasty)

The Grøva family were a late medieval and early modern noble family from Helgeland in Northern Norway. They owned land in Helgeland as well as the Trondheim Fjord region of Trøndelag. Affiliated with the Archbishop of Nidaros, the family supported Olav Engelbrektson, Regent of Norway in his Roman Catholic resistance against the Reformation during the Count's Feud in the 1530s. Their relatives were the Kusse family of Sandnes, a medieval branch of the Viking Age Arnmødling chieftain dynasty, whose members included Ingibiorg Finnsdottir, Queen consort of Scotland. The family is mentioned in Diplomatarium Norvegicum XIII 676, 677. During the 17th century, the family assimilated with local farmers.

== History ==
Known since c. 1400, the family descends from Olav, whose father may have been Trond. The latter's patrilineal grandson Peder Olavson married one of the Grøva sisters, heiresses of the allodial estate of Grøva, from whom the family thus assumed its name and primary residence.

Having a size of 1 våg and 36 marks, or roughly 12,000 decares (4.6 mi^{2}), Grøva was one of the largest agricultural production units in Vefsn farthing in Alstahaug syssel in Helgeland. The farm was established in the Viking Age, and would remain in the family's possession from the 9th century until 1897.

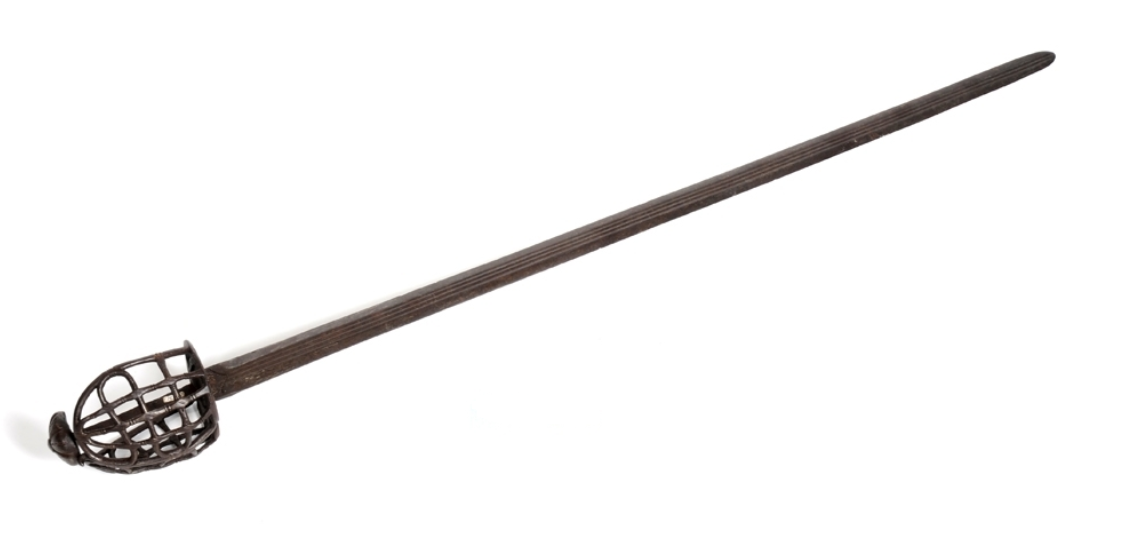
Sword from Grøva, 16th century

Both by birth and marriage, the Grøva family belonged to the small and influential class of landowners in Helgeland. According to Asgaut Steinnes, the family possessed a local estate, the extent of which nonetheless remains unknown.

The estate probably originated in one of the earlier, larger estate complexes in Helgeland, ultimately derived from the Viking Age sovereign chieftain dynasties of Hålogaland (cf. petty kingdoms of Norway). In addition, acquired by marriage in the 16th century, the family owned land in the Sparbu district of the Trondheim Fjord region in Trøndelag.

Among several noble houses, the family's in-laws were the Kusse family of Sandnes. Mentioned in Egil's Saga, this former chieftain seat had been owned by the Kusse family for centuries. The Kusse family, a name literally meaning 'the calves', were descendants of Kalv Arneson (c. 990–1051) of the Viking Age Arnmødling chieftain dynasty, whose members included Ingibjǫrg Finnsdóttir, Queen consort of Scotland and Þóra Þorbergsdóttir, Queen consort of Norway.

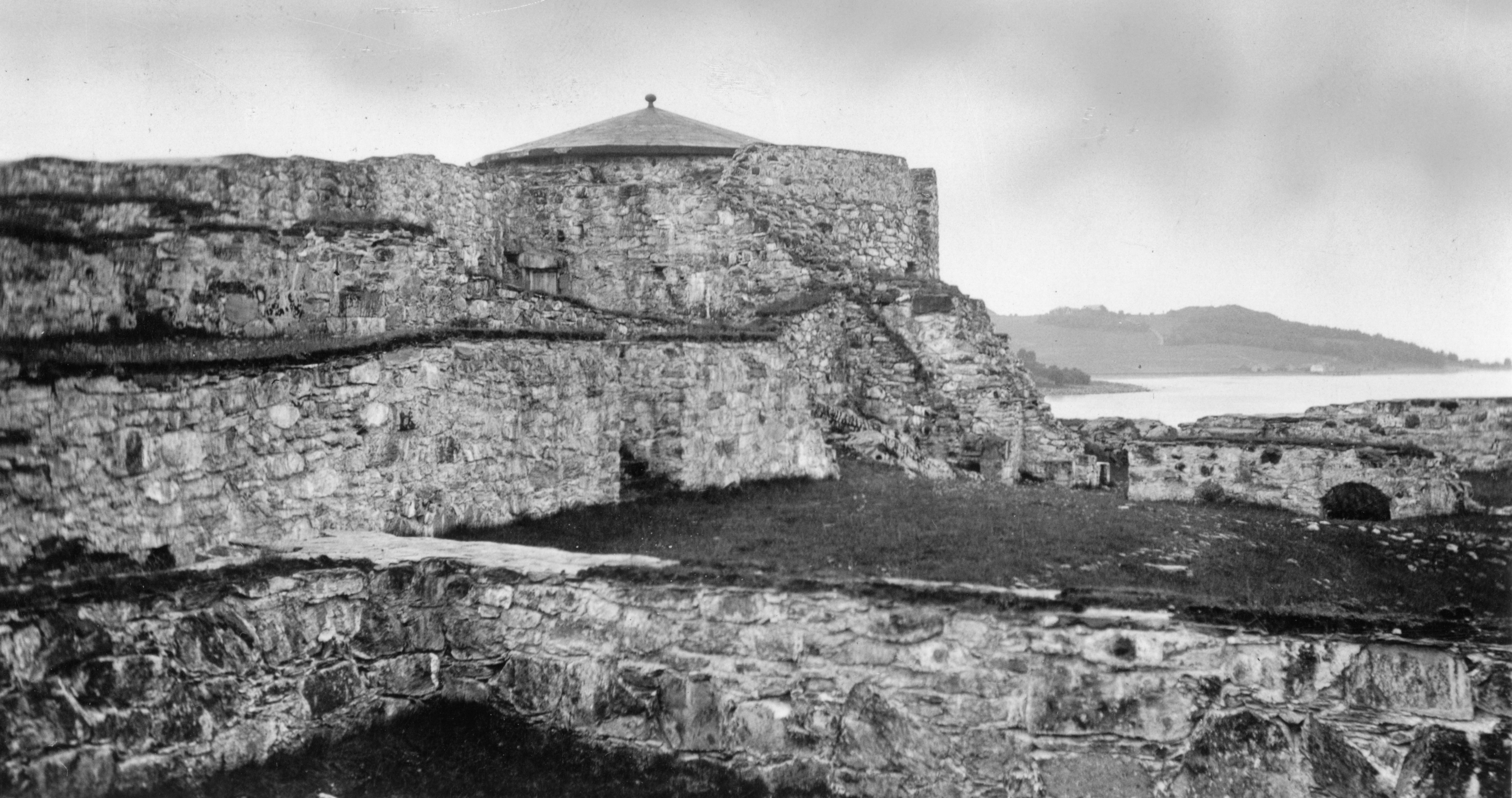
Steinvikholm Castle, 1939

In the 1530s, during the Count's Feud, Nils Pederson of Grøva served Archbishop Olav Engelbrektson, Regent of Norway, who from Steinvikholm Castle headed the national and Roman Catholic resistance against King Christian III of Denmark. Defeated in 1537, Archbishop Olav went into exile, and the Reformation was introduced in Norway. Nils Pederson should not be confused with the contemporary squire Nils Pederson of the Andenes family in Vesterålen.

The sword of Grøva is among few surviving swords of the landsknecht type in Norway. The blade is 98 centimetres long. Today, the sword belongs to Helgeland Museum. The Grøva family is mentioned in Diplomatarium Norvegicum, volume XIII, number 676 and 677. Issued in 1544, the two documents have near-identical contents but allegedly two different authors, with the first letter being written in Middle Norwegian language and the second being closer to Danish.

== Photo gallery ==
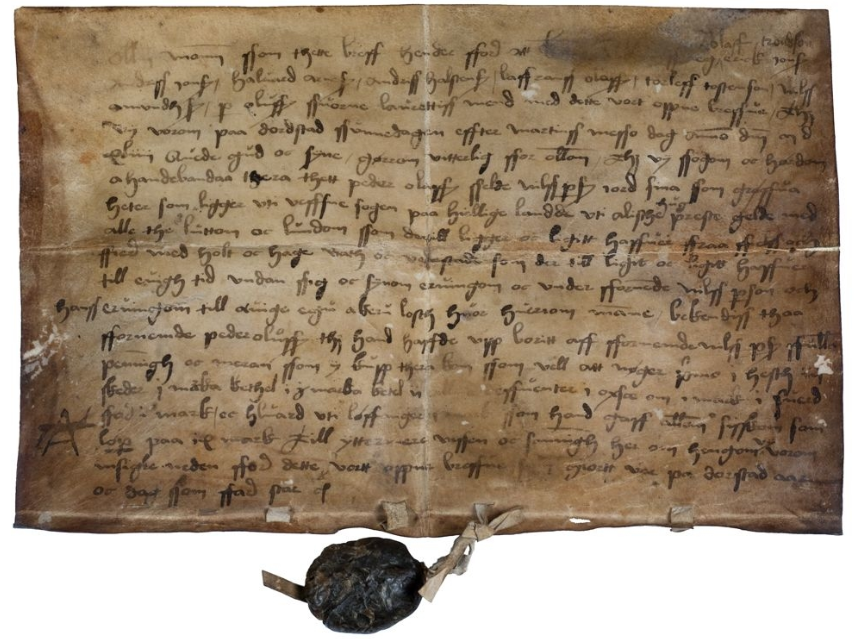
Document, 16 Nov 1544, cf. DN XIII 676

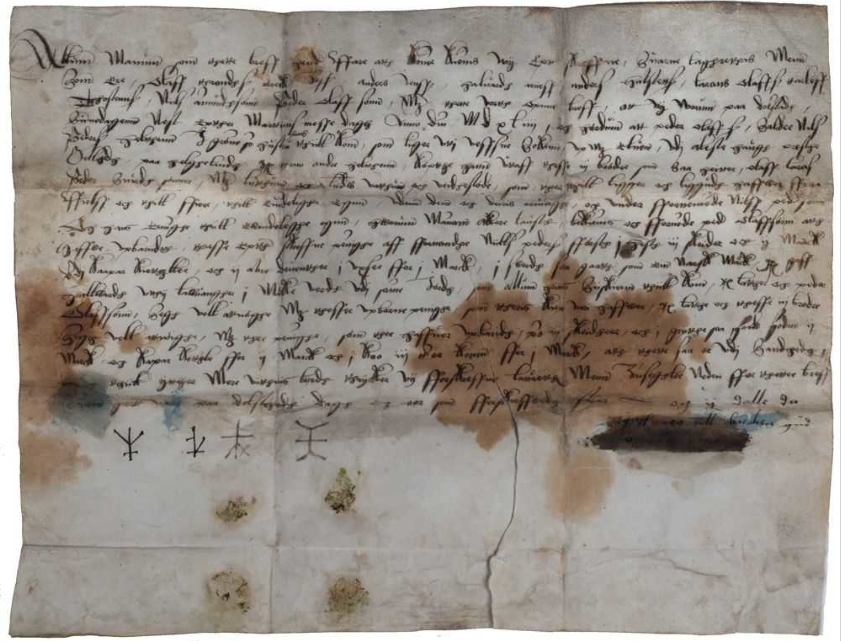
Document, 16 Nov 1544, cf. DN XIII 677

== See also ==
- Norwegian nobility

== Literature ==
- Bratberg, Terje 2022. 'Arnmødlingætten'. Store norske leksikon. Last updated 16 March. Retrieved 30 May 2022. URL: https://snl.no/Arnm%C3%B8dling%C3%A6tten
- Hasselberg, Kåre 1995. Helgelendinger før 1995 : Helgelendinger nevnt i sagalitteratur og andre skriftlige kilder fra middelalderen Forvik: Helgeland Historielag. URL: http://urn.nb.no/URN:NBN:no-nb_digibok_2012050308101
- Jacobsen, Kjell 1970. «Glimt fra Vefsn bygdesamling». In Årbok for Helgeland 1970, ed. Sigurd Arneklev, pp. 100–103. Nesna: Helgeland Historielag. https://urn.nb.no/URN:NBN:no-nb_digitidsskrift_2018030781322_001
- Jakobsen, M. 1922. Alstahaug Kanikgjeld eller nu Hatfjelddalen, Vefsen, Tjøtta, Alstahaug, Herø, Nesne, Hemnes, Mo sognekald : En historisk statistisk beskrivelse efter originale utrykte og trykte kilder fra de ældste tider indtil MDCCCCXIV (1914) Mosjøen. URL: http://urn.nb.no/URN:NBN:no-nb_digibok_2009070800013
- Kiil, Alf 1993. Da bøndene seilte : Bygdefarsbrukets historie i Nordlandene Messel Forlag. URL: http://urn.nb.no/URN:NBN:no-nb_digibok_2013062106045
- Skorpen, Knut 2012. Gardshistorie for Vefsn : Gnr. 1 – 32 med fjordbygdene, Vefsndalen og Eiterådalen Mosjøen: Vefsn bygdeboknemnd. https://urn.nb.no/URN:NBN:no-nb_digibok_2018052548051
- Svare, Bjarne & Ivar M. Edvardsen 1974. Vefsnbygdene fram til 1930 & Plantelivet i Vefsnbygdene Mosjøen: Vefsn kommune. URL: http://urn.nb.no/URN:NBN:no-nb_digibok_2012012406071
