= Sunndal =

Sunndal or Sundal may refer to:

== Places ==
- Sunndal Municipality, a municipality in Møre og Romsdal county, Norway
- Sunndal, Vestland, a village in Kvinnherad Municipality in Vestland county, Norway
- Sundal Hundred, a hundred in Dalsland, Sweden
- Sundal Township, Norman County, Minnesota , a township in Minnesota, United States

== People ==
- Geir Sundal, a retired Norwegian football defender
- Heidi Sundal, a Norwegian team handball player and Olympic medalist
- Kristoffer Eriksen Sundal, a ski jumper from Norway
- Mustafa Sundal, a Turkish singer-songwriter and actor
- Olav Sundal, a Norwegian gymnast who competed in the 1920 Summer Olympics

== Other ==
- Sunndal Fotball, a Norwegian association football club from Sunndalsøra
- Sundal Collier, an older name for ABG Sundal Collier, a Nordic investment bank

== See also ==
- Sundahl, a surname
