= Sveen (surname) =

Sveen is a surname. Notable people with the surname include:

- Åsmund Sveen (1910–1963), Norwegian poet, novelist and literary critic
- Bonnie Sveen (born 1989/1990), Australian actress
- Gard Sveen (born 1969), Norwegian crime fiction writer
- Gerald Sveen (1924–2021), American politician
- Karin Sveen (born 1948), Norwegian poet, novelist and essayist
- Lars Petter Sveen (born 1981), Norwegian novelist
- Ole Amund Sveen (born 1990), Norwegian football player
- Tor Sveen (born 1962), Norwegian football player
