= Stubsveen =

Stubsveen is a surname. Notable people with the surname include:

- Pål Anders Stubsveen (born 1981), Norwegian footballer
- Siv Stubsveen (born 1968), Norwegian media personality
