= Love and Attraction =

1979 book

- Title page for Love and Attraction: An International Conference (1979)
- Editor: Mark Cook, Glenn Wilson
- Language: English
- Genre: non-fiction
- Publisher: Pergamon Press
- Publication date: January 1, 1979
- Publication place: United Kingdom
- Pages: 554
- ISBN: 978-0080222349

Love and Attraction: An International Conference is an academic book edited by University College of Swansea professor Mark Cook and Glenn Wilson, published by Pergamon Press in 1979. The book is an outcome of the British Psychological Society's Love and Attraction Conference, which was held in the college in 1977 and drew over 100 scientists and researchers from multiple countries.
