= Bolso =

Bolso may refer to:

- Agnes Bolsø (born 1953), Norwegian sociologist
- Bolso, nickname of Uruguayan sports club Club Nacional de Football
- Freddy Bolsø, drummer in Blood Red Throne

== See also ==
- Ingrid Bolsø Berdal (born 1980), Norwegian actress
- Jair Bolsonaro (born 1955), of whom Bolso is a nickname
