= Wilson–Patterson Conservatism Scale =

Survey instrument used to measure political conservatism

The Wilson–Patterson Conservatism Scale (abbreviated W–P conservatism scale) is a widely used survey instrument intended to measure respondents' political ideology in terms of liberalism and conservatism. It is named after Glenn Wilson and John Patterson, who developed the scale and first described it in a 1968 paper. Many alternative, shorter versions of the scale have been proposed and used since the initial form was developed, and the scale itself has changed its format and questions since it was first created. Among the most common scales used to measure respondents' conservatism is the Wilson–Patterson Attitude Inventory, a modified version of the original W–P scale proposed by Wilson himself in 1975.
