= Øystein Hesjedal =

Norwegian footballer (born 1980)

Personal information
- Full name: Øystein Myklebust Hesjedal
- Date of birth: 17 July 1980 (age 46)
- Position: Defender

Youth career
- Kvernbit
- –1999: Åsane

Senior career*
Years	Team	Apps	(Gls)
2000–2001	Åsane		
2001	→ Kaupanger (loan)		
2002–2004	Sogndal	12	(0)
2006–2007	Kvernbit		
2008	Stryn		
2009	Åsane		
2010	Øystese		
2013–2015	Kvernbit		

Managerial career
- 2011: Øystese (assistant)
- 2013–2015: Kvernbit
- 2020–: Stryn
- * Club domestic league appearances and goals

Øystein Hesjedal (born 17 July 1980) is a retired Norwegian football defender.

He hails from Frekhaug. He moved to the city to play junior football, and was drafted into Åsane's senior team from their junior team ahead of the 2000 season. He moved to Sogndalsfjøra to study, and was loaned out to local club Kaupanger IL. After half a season there, he retired, but in the spring of 2002 he talked himself into training with Sogndal's B team, and in the summer of 2002 he made his first-team debut in Sogndal. After playing in the 2002 Norwegian Football Cup he also played one 2002 Eliteserien game. He left after the 2004 season and 12 Eliteserien games.

It was stated that Hesjedal became an assistant coach of Kaupanger's women's team. After a couple of seasons in Kvernbit he moved back to Sogn and Stryn in 2008. A comeback in Åsane in 2009 followed, then a transfer to Øystese. He became assistant coach here in 2011. In 2013 he joined Trond Egil Soltvedt in restarting Kvernbit's team, which had previously fallen apart. He coached Kvernbit until mid-2015, when he moved to Stryn Municipality. Ahead of the 2020 season he also became head coach of Stryn.
