= Anne Campbell (academic) =

British psychologist (1951–2017)

Anne C. Campbell (1951 – 26 February 2017) was a British academic and author specializing in evolutionary psychology. Her research was largely concerned with sex differences in aggression between men and women. She was professor of psychology at Durham University.

== Research ==
In the 1980s, Campbell studied female violence through ethnographic work with female gang members in New York, providing an account of how they came to accept casual killings, firebombings, and the warfare and violence of the streets. She subsequently investigated social representations of aggression: the different explanations that men and women offer for their own aggression. Campbell found that women are more likely than men to exhibit inhibitory control of aggression; when aggression is acted out, women tend to excuse it as a loss of self-control, whereas men tend to justify it as a means of imposing control over others.

Campbell's 1999 'Staying Alive' paper proposed an evolutionary explanation for sex differences in aggression, arguing that "female competition is more likely to take the form of indirect aggression [...] than among males". She went on to explore possible ways in which evolution might have shaped men's and women's psychology differently, in particular with regard to impulsivity and fear.

In intimate relationships, Campbell found that men lower their aggression towards their partner, and women raise their aggression depending on the intimacy with their partner.

In total, Campbell authored and co-authored more than 80 scientific papers on a broad range of topics including: the role of oxytocin in human behaviour, the measurement of life history strategies, aggression in intimate partnerships, the 'Dark Triad' of personality traits, competition between women, perceptions of one-night stands areas of dispute and agreement between feminism and evolutionary psychology, and even back pain.

== Appearances ==
In 2010, Campbell made a memorable appearance in the Norwegian documentary series Hjernevask ('Brainwash'), in which she argued forcefully against the gender theories of Norwegian philologists (philosopher Cathrine Egeland and literary theorist Jørgen Lorentzen). She also argued, however, that the effects of humans' evolved psychology are dependent on social context.

== Published works ==
=== Journal articles ===
- Full list available on ResearchGate

=== Books: authored/co-authored ===
- Campbell, Anne (2016) [2005]. "27. Women's Competition and Aggression". In Buss, David M. (ed.). The Handbook of Evolutionary Psychology, Volume 2: Integrations (2nd ed.). Hoboken, NJ: Wiley. pp. 684–703. ISBN 978-1-118-75580-8.
- Campbell, Anne (2005). "21. Aggression". In Buss, David M. (ed.). The Handbook of Evolutionary Psychology (1st ed.). Hoboken, NJ: Wiley. pp. 628–652. ISBN 978-0-471-26403-3.
- A Mind of Her Own: The Evolutionary Psychology of Women (Oxford: Oxford University Press, 2002; 2nd Edition, 2013)
- Men, Women and Aggression (New York/London: Basic Books/Harpercollins, 1993)
- The Girls in the Gang (New York & Oxford: Blackwell, 1986)

=== Books: edited ===
- The Social Child (Hove: Psychology Press, 1998)
