= Karl-Erik =

Karl-Erik or Karl Erik is a given name. Notable people with the name include:

- Karl-Erik Alberts (1910–1989), Swedish cinematographer
- Karl-Erik Andersson (1927–2005), Swedish footballer, bandy player and ice hockey player
- Karl-Erik Åström (1924–1993), Swedish cross-country skier
- Karl-Erik Bergsten (1909–1990), Swedish geographer
- Karl-Erik Björk, Swedish sprint canoeist
- Karl Erik Bøhn (1965–2014), Norwegian teacher, team handball player and coach
- Karl-Erik Bruneflod (1918–2008), Swedish curler
- Karl Erik Flens (1913–1975), Swedish film actor
- Karl-Erik Forsberg (1914–1995), Swedish calligrapher, typographer, graphic designer, artist
- Karl-Erik Grahn (1914–1963), Swedish football midfielder/forward
- Karl-Erik Grundel (born 1948), Swedish former rally driver and military pilot
- Karl Erik Harr (born 1940), Norwegian painter, illustrator, graphic artist and author
- Karl-Erik Holm or Karl Eric Holm (1919–2016), Swedish Army officer
- Karl-Erik Hult (1936–2010), Swedish football player and manager
- Karl-Erik Israelsson (1929–2013), Swedish Olympic long jumper
- Karl-Erik Johansson (1924–1987), Finnish rower
- Karl-Erik Köhler (1895–1958), German general during World War II
- Karl-Erik Lilja (born 1957), retired Swedish ice hockey player
- Karl Erik Nazarov (born 1999), Estonian sprinter
- Karl-Erik Nikkinen (born 1944), Finnish boxer
- Karl-Erik Nilsson (footballer) Malmö FF player
- Karl-Erik Nilsson (referee) (born 1957), president of the Swedish Football Association
- Karl-Erik Nilsson (wrestler) (1922–2017), light-heavyweight Greco-Roman wrestler from Sweden
- Karl-Erik Norman (1920–2005), Swedish musician and entertainer
- Karl Erik Olsson (1938–2021), Swedish Centre Party politician, Minister for Agriculture
- Karl-Erik Palmér (1929–2015), Swedish professional football player
- Karl-Erik Persson (1941–2016), Swedish politician and trade union leader
- Karl Erik Rimfeldt (born 1980), retired Norwegian football defender
- Karl-Erik Svensson (1891–1978), Swedish gymnast who competed in the 1912 Summer Olympics
- Karl-Erik Taukar (born 1989), Estonian singer, bass guitarist and television host
- Karl-Erik Wahlberg (1874–1934), Swedish curler who won a silver medal at the 1924 Winter Olympics
- Karl Erik Zachariassen (1942–2009), Norwegian entomologist
