= Trond Bjørndal =

Norwegian footballer (born 1969)

Personal information
- Date of birth: 9 October 1969 (age 57)
- Place of birth: Norway
- Height: 1.83 m (6 ft 0 in)
- Position: Defender

Youth career
- Kvernbit
- 1987–: Åsane

Senior career*
| Years | Team | Apps | (Gls) |
- Kvernbit
| 1988–1996 | Åsane | | |
| 1997–1999 | Haugesund | 37 | (4) |
| 1998 | → Bryne (loan) | 6 | (0) |
| 2000 | Vejle | 8 | (0) |
| 2001 | Åsane | | |

Managerial career
- 2004: Åsane
- 2005: Løv-Ham (assistant)
- 2006: Løv-Ham
- 2007–2019: Åsane (director of sports)
- * Club domestic league appearances and goals

Trond Bjørndal (born 9 October 1969) is a Norwegian football coach and former player.

Hailing from Frekhaug, he started his career in IL Kvernbit, and joined Åsane Fotball as a youth player before being drafted into their senior team in 1988.

Bjørndal went on trial at SK Brann after the 1988 season. After the 1995 season, Bjørndal was on a lengthy trial in Viking FK, but picked up an injury at the last moment. Following a good 1996 season with Åsane, Bjørndal was approached by Sogndal IL, Aalesund and FK Haugesund.

He opted to join FK Haugesund, and enjoyed a spell in the Eliteserien in the seasons 1997 and 1998. In 1998 he was also on loan at Bryne FK from early May to late June 1998.

He left ahead of the 2000 season to join Danish team Vejle BK, having formerly trialled for Sheffield United. Bjørndal made eight appearances in the 1999–2000 Danish Superliga as Vejle were relegated.

After half a year without a club, Bjørndal rejoined Åsane ahead of the 2001 season. He left after the season.

Ahead of the 2004 season, Bjørndal was hired as head coach of Åsane, with Håkon Østevold as assistant coach. Bjørndal only stayed for one year, and was hired as assistant coach under Magnus Johansson at Løv-Ham Fotball ahead of the 2005 season. One year later, Johansson left and Bjørndal was promoted to head coach. Løv-Ham survived the battle against relegation, but Bjørndal resigned at the end of the season. Shortly thereafter, Bjørndal was hired as director of sports in Åsane. Here, he remained for 12 years until resigning in 2019.
