= Sundahl =

Sundahl is a surname. Notable people with the surname include:

- Deborah Sundahl (1954-2023), an American author and LGBT-activist
- Jonas Erikson Sundahl (1678-1762), a Swedish-born architect who spent most of his working life in Germany
- Roland Sundahl (1930-1952), an American murderer

== See also ==
- Sunndal (disambiguation)
