= Centre for Gender Research =

Research centre at the University of Oslo

The Centre for Gender Research (Norwegian: Senter for tverrfaglig kjønnsforskning; STK) is a research centre in Oslo, Norway, that is affiliated with the University of Oslo. It was established in 1986, originally named the Centre for Women's Studies, and received its current name in 2008. It was established with support from the Research Council of Norway as an independent entity, and is not part of the ordinary structure of the university. It was originally a research centre, and started offering educational programmes in women's studies/gender studies in 2003 and 2011. The research at the centre is traditionally mainly based in the humanities and social studies. The centre is one of the smallest independent entities affiliated with the university with 4 permanent academic employees, as well as doctoral and postdoctoral researchers and guest researchers.

== History ==
The Centre for Women's Studies (Norwegian: Senter for kvinneforskning; SFK) was established in 1986 by the Research Council of Norway, as a temporary project that was extended for another trial period in 1990. It was affiliated with the University of Oslo, but did not form a part of the university's ordinary structure and was not located on the university campus. Former centre director Harriet Bjerrum Nielsen said the centre was often ignored and marginalized within the university, and its research was often suspected of being political and unscholarly by representatives of the university proper. The future of the centre has been debated several times in light of its originally temporary status and funding, and there have been proposals to integrate the centre's staff into an institute at the Faculty of Humanities such as the Department of Philosophy or transfer it to another institution. Eventually the centre was given semi-permanent status as a centre outside the ordinary university structure. The centre published the magazine Bulletine.

The centre featured prominently in the 2010 NRK TV documentary series Hjernevask and in the public debate over the program, both of which focused strongly on literary scholar Jørgen Lorentzen, one of the researchers at the centre; the debate in the aftermath of Hjernevask also featured the centre more broadly and led to a nation-wide debate over its research and focus, and several centre employees took part in the debate. The centre's director Jorunn Økland said that Hjernevask had had a negative impact on the centre and that "it is clear that the centre has suffered a loss of reputation."

A 2008 book by Maud Eduards (a former visiting professor at the centre) and other Swedish gender studies scholars also included a critical analysis of Jørgen Lorentzen in a chapter titled "Bättre med män" [Men are better].
