= Mathias Eikenes =

Norwegian footballer (born 1985)

Personal information
- Date of birth: 13 February 1985 (age 41)
- Position: Forward

Youth career
- Sandane

Senior career*
Years	Team	Apps	(Gls)
–2003	Sandane		
2004–2006	Sogndal	37	(0)
2004	→ Sandane (loan)		
2006–2008	Stryn		
2009	Ranheim		
2010	Sandane		
2013	Stryn		
2014–2017	Spjelkavik		
2019–	Byneset		

International career
2002	Norway U17	4	(0)
2003	Norway U18	2	(1)
2005–2006	Norway U21	2	(1)
- * Club domestic league appearances and goals

Mathias Eikenes (born 13 February 1985) is a retired Norwegian football striker.

Growing up in Sandane TIL, he represented Norway as a youth international. He joined Sogndal IL ahead of the 2004 season, with a loan back to Sandane until 1 July. In the summer of 2006 he went on to Stryn TIL.

In 2009 he joined Ranheim IL, and followed by a period in Sandane as well as a hiatus he rejoined Stryn in 2013. Finishing with his education as a medical doctor, he In 2014 he was employed by Ålesund Hospital and played from 2014 to 2017 for Spjelkavik IL.
