= Arild Rebne =

Norwegian footballer (born 1972)

Personal information
- Date of birth: 29 November 1972 (age 53)
- Position: Midfielder

Senior career*
Years	Team	Apps	(Gls)
- Vind
- Gjøvik-Lyn
1994–1996	Ham Kam	49	(2)
1997	Gjøvik-Lyn		
1998–2004	Raufoss		
2005–2008	Gjøvik-Lyn		

Managerial career
- 2008: Gjøvik-Lyn
- * Club domestic league appearances and goals

Arild Rebne (born 29 November 1972) is a retired Norwegian football midfielder.

He played for Vind IL and SK Gjøvik-Lyn before joining Hamarkameratene. He made his Norwegian Premier League debut on 23 May 1994, and got 49 league games in total.

He then left for Gjøvik-Lyn, but in 1998 he moved to Raufoss IL. Ahead of the 2005 season he went to Gjøvik-Lyn for a new period. He also coached the team in 2008.
