= Jan Økern =

Norwegian marketer and sports executive (1952–2022)

Jan Økern (8 May 1952 – 18 January 2022) was a Norwegian marketer and sports executive.

== Biography ==
Økern grew up at Høvik and Hosle, and was a football midfielder for Stabæk IF in the 1970s. He settled at Nesøya. He has chaired Stabæk Fotball ASA for fifteen years, being among the group that in 1990 decided to transform Stabæk into one of Norway's premier football clubs.

He has the cand.real. degree in petroleum geology from the University of Oslo, and started his career as a geophysicist in Geoteam. He later started Intergraph, was chief executive of Helioprint and adviser in PA Consulting Group. He then entered the marketing business as chairman of the board JBR Reklamebyrå, and with JBR partner Ingebrigt Steen Jensen and others he founded the advertising agency Dinamo in 1997. He was the chief executive of Dinamo for seven years, being succeeded in the position by co-founder Bjarne Wollmann in 2004. Økern went on to be chief executive of Bull&Bear and OxySolutions.

Økern died on 18 January 2022 at Åros, at the age of 69.
