= Kathrine Rokke =

Norwegian cross-country skier

Personal information
- Nationality: Norway
- Born: 28 September 1970 (age 55)

Sport
- Sport: Skiing
- Club: IL Stjørdals-Blink

World Cup career
- Seasons: 9 – (1992–2000)
- Indiv. starts: 33
- Indiv. podiums: 0
- Team starts: 5
- Team podiums: 0
- Overall titles: 0 – (33rd in 1994)
- Discipline titles: 0

Kathrine Rokke (born 28 September 1970) is a retired Norwegian cross-country skier.

She made her FIS Cross-Country World Cup debut in March 1992 in Vang with a 47th place. She collected her first World Cup points with a 20th-place finish in January 1993 in Kavgolovo, and recorded her only top 10-placement in January 1994 in the same location. She retired from competitive skiing following the March 2000 Holmenkollen ski festival.

She represented the sports club IL Stjørdals-Blink.

== Cross-country skiing results ==
All results are sourced from the International Ski Federation (FIS).

=== World Cup ===
==== Season standings ====
Season	Age				
Season	Age	Overall	Long Distance	Middle Distance	Sprint
1992	21	NC	—N/a	—N/a	—N/a
1993	22	43	—N/a	—N/a	—N/a
1994	23	33	—N/a	—N/a	—N/a
1995	24	62	—N/a	—N/a	—N/a
1996	25	46	—N/a	—N/a	—N/a
1997	26	40	NC	—N/a	34
1998	27	45	NC	—N/a	42
1999	28	NC	NC	—N/a	—
2000	29	89	NC	NC	61
