= Jan Petter Olsen =

Norwegian footballer (born 1965)

Personal information
- Date of birth: 19 February 1965 (age 61)
- Position: Striker

Youth career
- Skeid

Senior career*
Years	Team	Apps	(Gls)
–1996	Skeid		
1997–2002	Årvoll		
- * Club domestic league appearances and goals

Jan Petter Olsen (born 19 February 1965) is a retired Norwegian football striker.

He hails from Sinsen, Oslo and started playing for Skeid as a child. He also played bandy for Skeid and ishockey he have played A-football, A-Ishockey and A-bandy for the same club Skeid, and when approaching adulthood he concentrated on that sport. He was capped three times for Norway in 1989.

Olsen started playing football again at the age of 22, and scored the goal that secured Skeid's promotion from the 1995 1. divisjon. He had then played bandy for Røa as late as the Norwegian Bandy Premier League 1994–95.

In the 1996 Eliteserien he played 18 games for Skeid. Ahead of the 1997 season he joined. Falkirk. Then Årvoll, where he played for several years.
