= Kristin Fridtun =

Norwegian ski jumper, writer and author

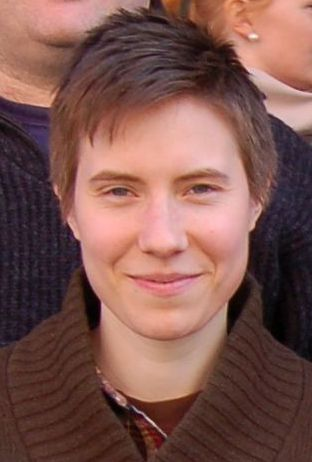

Kristin Fridtun (born 9 November 1987) is a Norwegian writer, author and former ski jumper who represented Elverum Hopp.

== Biography ==
Fridtun grew up in Elverum Municipality. She has two national bronze medals, on snow and artificial (unofficial), from 2003. In the unofficial women's class at the Junior World Championships in Stryn in 2004, she was on the Norwegian team which won the team competition, and she finished 11th in the individual rankings. At the Women's Ski Jumping Week in 2004, she finished joint 17th. In March 2006, she took part in two round of the Continental Cup in Vikersund normal hill and Våler in Hedmark, her 24th and 23rd places gave her 49th place overall for the 2005/06 season.

Fridtun lives in Bergen. She has a master's degree in Norse philology from NTNU, and is a columnist in the Nynorsk newspaper Dag og Tid.

Fridtun is gay and transgender.

== Bibliography ==
- Norsk etymologisk oppkok – Du veit ikkje kva du snakkar om. Published 2012
- Nynorsk for dumskallar. Published 2013
- Kjønn og ukjønn, prose, Published 2015

== Sources ==
- Ladies-Skijumping.com: Kristin Fridtun (Accessed 28 August 2012)
- NM 2003 – Normal hill results (Accessed 28 August 2012)
- National Championships placings 2003 – Normal hill results (Accessed 28 August 2012)
- Aftenposten: Ordene du ikke visste at du lurte på (28 August 2012, accessed same day)
- Presentation by Kristin Fridtun at Forfatterkatalogen på Forfattersentrums nettsider
