= Johan Martin Lianes =

Norwegian footballer (born 1976)

Personal information
- Date of birth: 4 June 1976 (age 50)
- Position: Goalkeeper

Senior career*
| Years | Team | Apps | (Gls) |
| 1993–1994 | Kongsvinger | | |
| 1995– | Galterud | | |
| –1997 | Brandval | | |
| 1998–2000 | Kongsvinger | 12 | (0) |
| 2000–2002 | FC Nordjylland | | |
| 2002 | Sander | | |
| 2004 | Strømmen | | |
| 2007 | Nes | | |
| 2008 | Galterud | | |
| 2009 | Lunderseter | | |
| 2009–present | Vaaler | | |
- * Club domestic league appearances and goals

Johan Martin Lianes (born 4 June 1976) is a retired Norwegian football goalkeeper.

He started his career in Kongsvinger IL, and played for Norwegian youth national teams. He was drafted into Kongsvinger IL's senior team ahead of the 1993 season. Ahead of the 1995 season he left for Galterud IF. He also played for Brandval IL before rejoining Kongsvinger ahead of the 1998 season. He played 12 games over the next three seasons.

In 2000, he joined Aalborg Chang, a club that changed name to FC Nordjylland in 2001. In early 2002 he expressed desire to leave FC Nordjylland, and he joined Sander IL in the same year. He then retired, but changed his mind, and ahead of the 2004 season he joined Strømmen IF.

After the 2004 season he retired again, and he remained inactive for a period, despite the announcement that he signed for Galterud IF ahead of the 2006 season. In the 2007 season he made a comeback for Nes SK in the Fifth Division (sixth tier). He had recently moved to Helgøya. In 2008, he appeared for Galterud IF, and he also spent some time in Lunderseter IL before joining Vaaler IF in 2009.

He has also been a football referee in the lower leagues.
