= Trond Soleng =

Norwegian footballer and physiotherapist

Personal information
- Date of birth: 28 February 1973 (age 53)
- Height: 1.81 m (5 ft 11 in)
- Position: Midfielder

Youth career
- Fløya
- Tromsø

Senior career*
Years	Team	Apps	(Gls)
1992–1994	Tromsø	1	(0)
1994	→ Kiruna (loan)		
1995–1997	Odd		
1997–1999	BK Frem		
1999–2001	Fremad Amager		
2001	Skarp		
- * Club domestic league appearances and goals

Trond Soleng (born 28 February 1973) is a retired Norwegian football midfielder.

Hailing from Mortensnes and Vesterli in Tromsø, Soleng got one league game and two cup games for Tromsø IL. He then played three seasons for Odds BK, as well as spells in Sweden and Denmark. He returned to Tromsø and IF Skarp in 2001, but soon retired after prolonged injury problems.

He settled as a physiotherapist in Tromsø.
