= Lorenzo Caroprese =

Norwegian football defender (born 1976)

Personal information
- Date of birth: 13 August 1976 (age 50)
- Position: Defender

Senior career*
Years	Team	Apps	(Gls)
1995–1997	Vålerenga		
1997	→ Strømmen (loan)		
1998–2002	Lørenskog		
2003	Oslo Øst		
2004–2005	Drøbak/Frogn		
2006	Andes		
2006–2009	Manglerud Star		
- * Club domestic league appearances and goals

Lorenzo Caroprese (born 13 August 1976) is a Norwegian football defender.

He started his career in Vålerenga Fotball, and also played ice hockey as a child. He played on youth national teams together with Martin Andresen, Thorstein Helstad, Steffen Iversen and Freddy dos Santos among others. He was drafted into Vålerenga's senior team ahead of the 1995 season. He played one Norwegian Premier League game in both 1995 and in 1996. As Vålerenga were relegated after the 1996 season, Caroprese was loaned out to Strømmen IF. He returned to Vålerenga before the end of 1997, but after the season he went to Lørenskog IF.

Caroprese played well, and in 2001 Lørenskog won promotion to the Norwegian First Division. He was wanted by Strømsgodset IF, but the move did not materialize. Lørenskog was relegated after one season, and Caroprese moved to FK Oslo Øst. He played for Drøbak/Frogn IF and IK Andes before rejoining Oslo Øst, which in the meantime had been renamed to Manglerud Star.
