= Øystein Vetti =

Norwegian footballer (born 1986)

Personal information
- Date of birth: 1 February 1986 (age 40)
- Position: Defender

Senior career*
Years	Team	Apps	(Gls)
–2003	Jølster		
2004–2006	Sogndal	4	(0)
2006	→ Årdal (loan)		
2007–2014	Førde		
2017	Førde	1	(0)

International career
2003	Norway U-17	4	(0)

Managerial career
- 2018–: Førde (assistant)
- * Club domestic league appearances and goals

Øystein Vetti (born 1 February 1986) is a retired Norwegian football defender.

Growing up in Jølster IL, he represented Norway as a youth international. He joined Sogndal in 2004 and featured briefly on the first and second tier. Loaned out to Årdal FK in 2006, a lengthy spell in Førde IL would be his last career station. He retired in 2014 and played a standalone game in 2017.

Vetti became assistant coach of Førde in 2018, and continued in 2019.
