= Maud Eduards =

Swedish academic

- Born: 28 February 1944 (age 82)

Academic work
- Discipline: Political science, gender studies

Maud Elisabeth Landby Eduards (born 28 February 1944) is a Swedish political scientist and gender studies scholar. She is professor emerita of political science at Stockholm University, and also worked at the University of Oslo. Eduards is known for her research women, peace and security policy. A festschrift was published in Eduard's honour in 2011.

== Life ==
Eduards earned her PhD in 1985 with a dissertation on regional cooperation between Morocco, Algeria, Tunisia and Libya in the period 1962–1984. In the Spring of 1996, she was a Fellow at the Swedish Collegium for Advanced Study in Uppsala, Sweden. In 1996 she was appointed as professor of political science at Stockholm University. Eduards was also professor of gender studies at the University of Oslo's Centre for Women's Studies/Centre for Women's and Gender Studies from 1999 to 2004. She is professor emerita of political science at Stockholm University.

Eduards is known for her research on women, peace and security policy. Her research has covered women's organization, women and politics, power relationships, violence against women, and resistance to change within organisations and structures. She has also investigated how gender relates to armed conflicts, Swedish security policy and militarization. Eduards has argued that the use of the phrase "women and children" in relation to armed conflicts increases women's vulnerability, and reduces their agency, and that by treating women and children as one group it hides the different types of violence that women and children are subjected to.

A Festschrift in her honour titled Kön, makt, nation was published by Stockholm University in 2011.

== Bibliography ==
- Maud Eduards: "Feminism som partipolitik: Feministiskt initiativ i Simrishamn 2010-2014", Leopard, 2016
- Paulina de los Reyes, Maud Eduards, Fia Sundevall (eds.): "Internationella relationer - könskritiska perspektiv", Liber, 2013
- Maud Eduards and Maria Wendt: "Fienden mitt ibland oss: kön och nation i pressbevakningen av Feministiskt initiativ". In: Maria Jansson, Maria Wendt and Cecilia Åse (eds.): Den nationella väven : feministiska analyser, 2010
- Maud Eduards: ”Vad har ett badlakan med säkerhetspolitik att göra?”, in Lenita Freidenvall and Maria Jansson (eds.): Politik och kritik. En feministisk guide till statsvetenskap, Studentlitteratur 2010.
- Maud Eduards, Anna Wahl med flera: Motstånd och fantasi: historien om F. Studentlitteratur, 2008
- Maud Eduards: Kroppspolitik. Om Moder Svea och andra kvinnor. Bokförlaget Atlas, Stockholm, 2007
- Maud Eduards: "Våld utan gränser: om krig och hotad manlighet", in Yvonne Svanström and Kjell Östberg (eds.): Än män då? Kön och feminism i Sverige under 150 år, Atlas Akademi 2004
- Maud Eduards: Förbjuden handling - om kvinnors organisering och feministisk teori. Liber, 2002
- Maud Eduards, Gunnel Gustafsson and Malin Rönnblom (eds.): Towards a New Democratic Order? Women's Organizing in Sweden in the 1990's. Publica, 1997
