= Martine Aurdal =

Norwegian journalist and editor

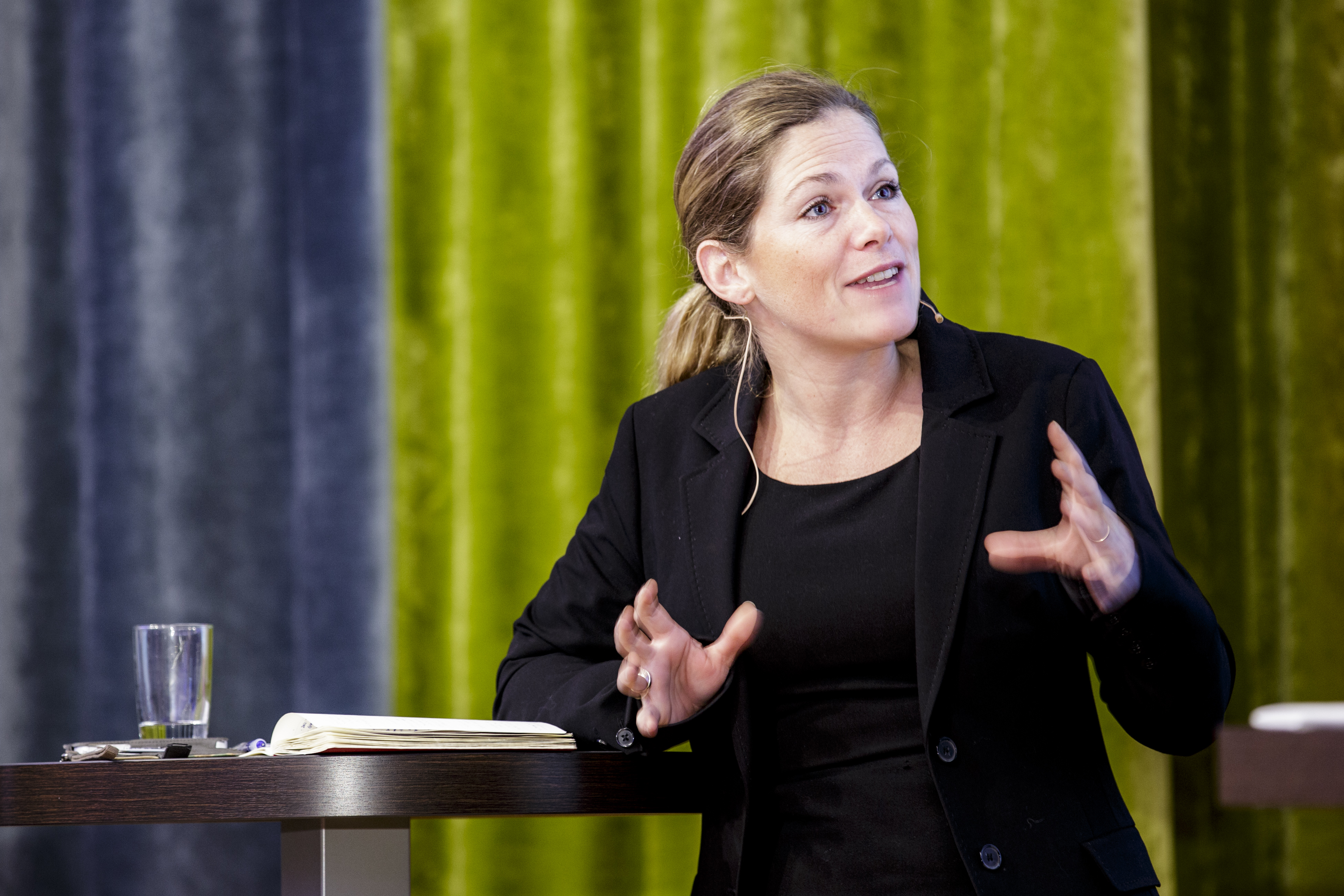
Martine Aurdal at NBBLs frokostmøte 2014.

Martine Aurdal (born 17 September 1978) is a Norwegian journalist and editor.

She was born in Oslo. A cand.mag. by education, she started her journalistic career in Ullern Avis/Akersposten and worked in NRK, Klassekampen, Aftenposten and Fett before being editor-in-chief of Ny Tid from 2006 to 2008. Since 2008 she has worked in Dagbladet, being one of their most profiled commentators.

She is married to Erling Fossen.
