= Trond H. Diseth =

Norwegian psychiatrist

Trond Haaken Diseth (born 5 July 1957) is a Norwegian child psychiatrist. He is Professor of Child and Adolescent Psychiatry at the University of Oslo and a chief consultant at the Children's Clinic at Oslo University Hospital, Rikshospitalet. He is an expert on behavioral and brain functions.

He graduated with the cand.med. degree at the University of Oslo in 1984, received the dr.med. (D.Sc.) degree from the same university in 1997 and is a specialist in child and adolescent psychiatry. He was appointed as a senior consultant at the State Hospital for Child and Adolescent Psychiatry in 1991 and joined Rikshospitalet as a senior consultant in child and adolescent psychiatry in 1997. He has been chief consultant (head of department) at Rikshospitalet since 2004 and became a full Professor of Child and Adolescent Psychiatry at the University of Oslo in 2005.

Trond H. Diseth was interviewed in the television documentary Hjernevask in 2010.
