= Marius Aam =

Norwegian footballer (born 1980)

Personal information
- Date of birth: 14 November 1980 (age 45)
- Place of birth: Norway
- Height: 1.76 m (5 ft 9 in)
- Position: Defender

Youth career
- Aalesund

Senior career*
Years	Team	Apps	(Gls)
–2006	Aalesund		
2007–2008	Skarbøvik		
2010	Hessa		
2014	Skarbøvik		
- * Club domestic league appearances and goals as of 8 June 2015

Marius Aam (born 14 November 1980) is a Norwegian former footballer who played as a defender, most notably in Tippeligaen for Aalesund.

He started his career in Aalesund, and played first-tier football for them in Tippeligaen 2003 and 2005. He was not a first-team regular, and quit the team in early 2006. The next season, he fielded for Ålesund's second best club at the time, Skarbøvik IF.

Leaving Skarbøvik ahead of the 2009 season, he later featured for sixth-tier club Hessa. He also made a comeback in Skarbøvik.
