= Are Grongstad =

Norwegian handball player (born 1988)

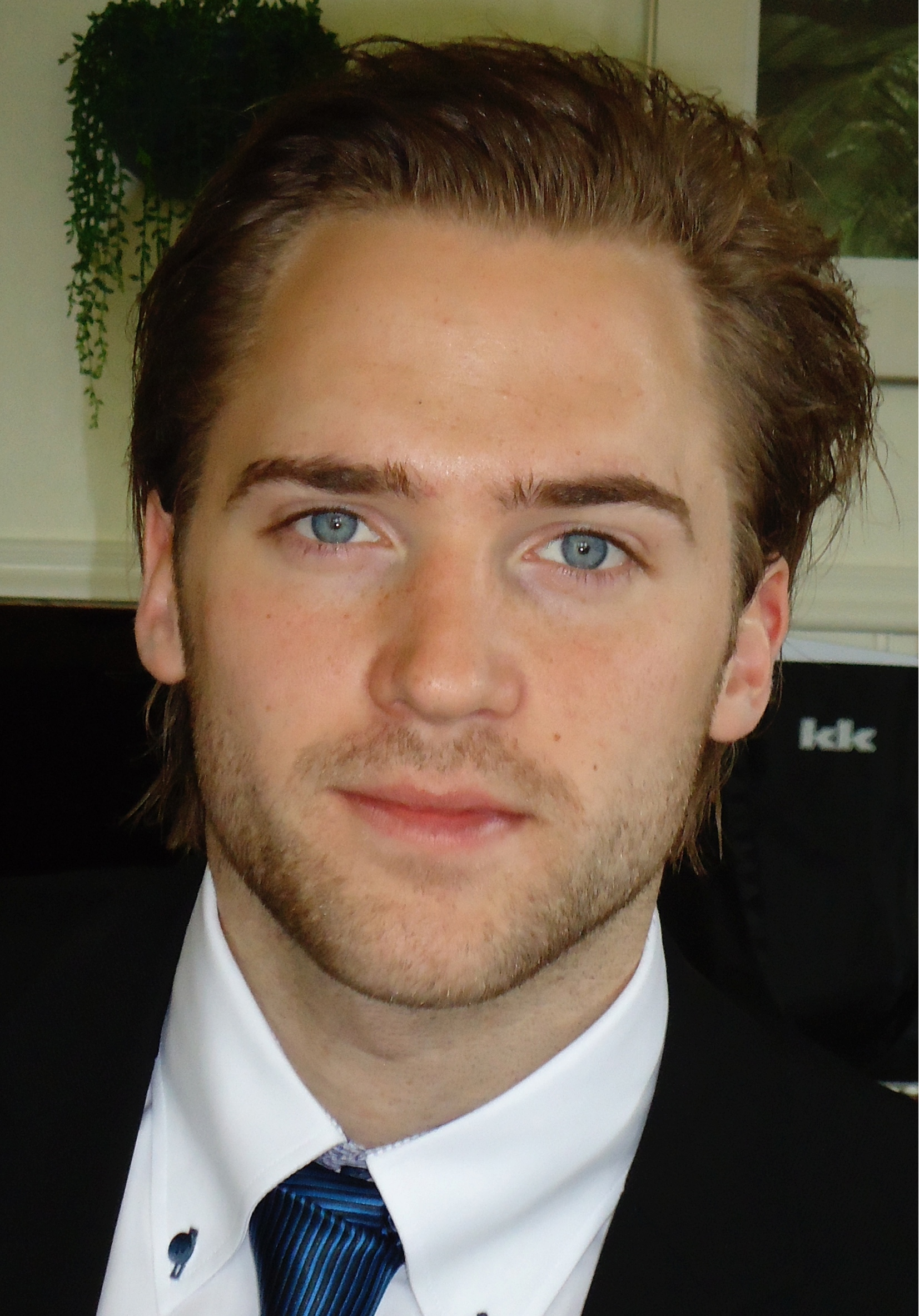
Are Grongstad

Are Kristoffer Grongstad (born April 9, 1988 in Namsos Municipality, Norway) is a former handball player. He retired in 2011, at age 23, to focus on his studies.

== Handball career ==
Grongstad started in the local handball club Klompen HK, before moving to Trondheim to pursue a handball career at the age of 16. He started playing for Strindheim Idrettslag before he quite quickly changed club to Heimdal HK that played in the top league. Because of the financial mess in Heimdal HK they went bankrupt after two seasons in the club. Then Grongstad transferred to Elverum where he played for Elverum Handball. After two seasons in Elverum, he again transferred, then to Nøtterøy Idrettsforening. When Grongstad had completed his second season for Nøtterøy Idrettsforening he chose to retire.

=== Medals in handball ===
- 1.division - Gold (2011)
- Norwegian Cup - Silver (2008)
- Playoff - Gold (2007)
- 1.division - Gold (2006)

== Media focus ==
At the age of 20, Grongstad came out as the first openly gay top athlete in Norway. This caused a stir in the Norwegian and Scandinavian press. The first six days after Grongstad told his story in the media, it was calculated that the media attention he got was worth over 2.8 million NOK. Two years after Grongstad first told about his sexual orientation in the media, he said he regretted the way he did it and we warned other young athletes to do the same, but at the same time he urged the established athletes to take the first steps. Grongstad was a part of a book project called "Skapsprengerne" that was written by the Norwegian minister Anniken Huitfeldt. He did this project with celebrities like Gro Hammerseng, Marit Breivik and the Crown Princess of Norway, Mette Marit. On several occasions Grongstad travels across the country to hold talks about his personal experience through his career and also the importance of taking the time to recognize other people when you are a coach for UNICEF in a project called "Den Ene". Grongstad has also since 2010 been in a resource group for the Norwegian Handball Federation where they focus on how to include everyone in the sports.

=== Awards ===
- Sports hero of the year (2010)
- Honorary Rose (2009)
- Norwegian Hero (2009)
