= Trond Hansen =

Norwegian football manager (born 1951)

Trond Hansen (born 5 March 1951) is a Norwegian football manager.

He played one league game and three cup games for Rosenborg BK in 1970, later featuring for local teams Vestbyen, Trygg/Lade, Falken and Ranheim.

He coached Malvik IL before taking over Strindheim IL's junior team. In 1994 he was promoted to first-team head coach and immediately led the team to promotion, and Strindheim's second stint on the first tier. The team did not fare well there and Hansen was fired halfway through the season.

Ahead the 1996 season he was hired in Nardo FK, where he remained head coach for many years.
