= Morten-André Olsen =

Norwegian footballer (born 1979)

Morten Olsen
Personal information
- Full name: Morten-André Olsen
- Date of birth: 28 January 1979 (age 47)
- Height: 1.87 m (6 ft 2 in)
- Position: Goalkeeper

Youth career
- Bodø/Glimt

Senior career*
Years	Team	Apps	(Gls)
1998	Gevir Bodø		
1999–2000	Lofoten		
2001	Alta		
2002	Steigen		
2003	Sandefjord	0	(0)
2004	Odd	4	(0)

International career
1994	Norway U15	6	(0)
1995	Norway U16	7	(0)
1996	Norway U17	3	(0)
1997	Norway U18	1	(0)
- * Club domestic league appearances and goals

Morten-André Olsen (born 28 January 1979) is a retired Norwegian football goalkeeper.

He grew up in FK Bodø/Glimt and became a youth international; the club also produced the youth international goalkeepers Jonas Ueland Kolstad (born 1976) and Erling Bakkemo (born 1981). On senior level he joined FK Gevir Bodø in 1997. In 1999 he moved together with Gevir's head coach to FK Lofoten and featured in the 1. divisjon. Compulsory military service combined with family life caused career stagnation. He returned to Gevir ahead of the 2001 season, but the club went defunct and he instead joined Alta IF. In 2002 he played for Steigen SK, but moved to South Norway and Skien. After training with Pors he moved to Sandefjord in 2003, where he got 2 cup games, and Odd in 2004, where he made his debut in Eliteserien, playing 4 league games and 3 cup games.
