= Agnes Bolsø =

Norwegian sociologist (born 1953)

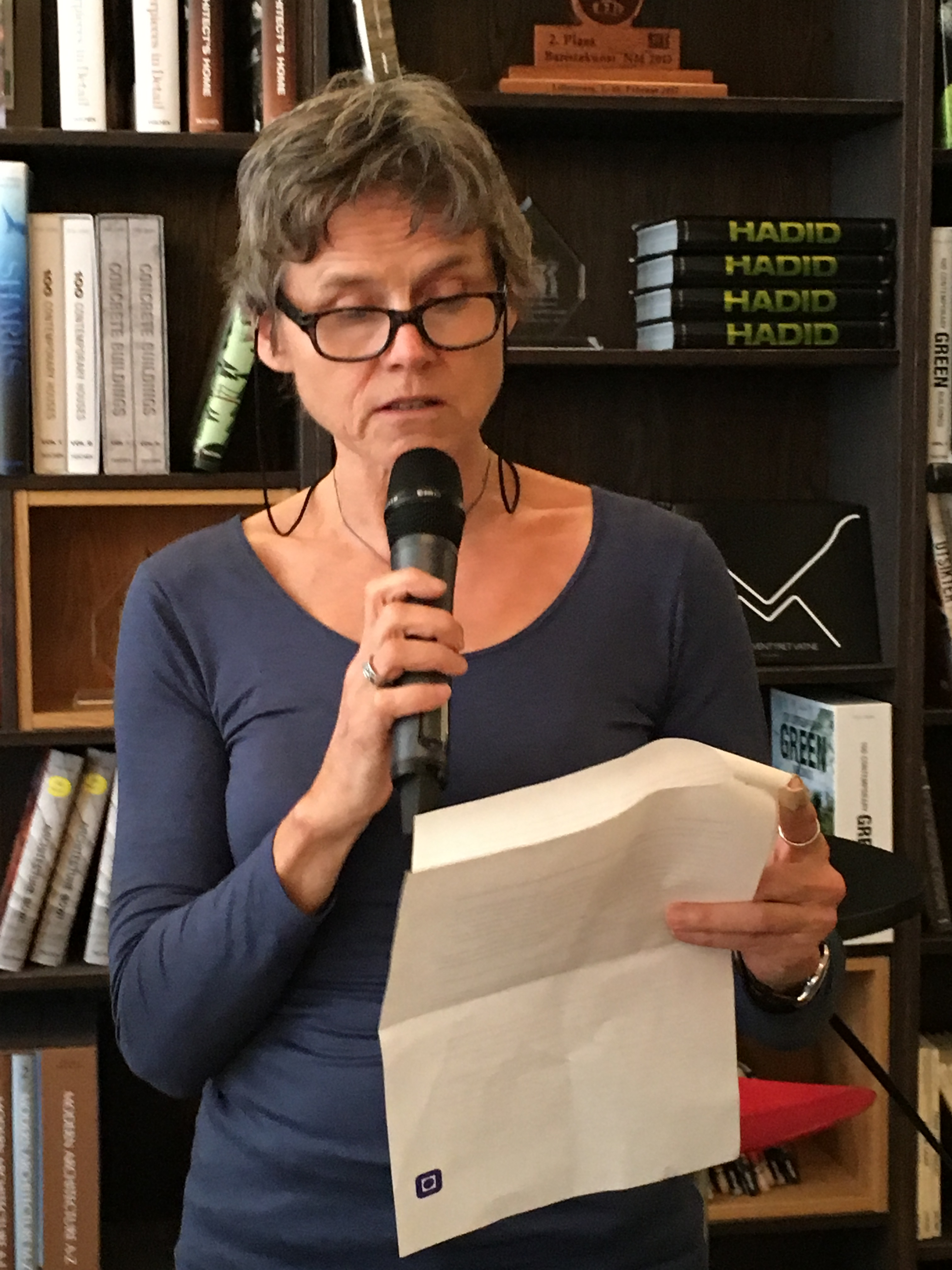
Agnes Bolsø

Agnes Bolsø (born 4 June 1953) is a Norwegian sociologist and expert on gender studies, particularly studies of sexuality. She is associate professor of sociology at the Norwegian University of Science and Technology (NTNU) and was director of its Centre for Gender Studies from 2005 to 2007. She was editor of Tidsskrift for kjønnsforskning (the Norwegian Journal of Gender Studies) from 2009 to 2011.

Bolsø holds a cand.mag. degree from the University of Trondheim (1976), a cand.polit. degree in sociology (1981) and a dr.polit. degree from 2002. She was researcher at the Centre for Rural Research from 1987 to 1994, and has been employed at NTNU since 1994, where she became associate professor in 2001. She has been a visiting scholar at the University of Minneapolis, the University of York, the University of London and the University of New South Wales. She is also a regular commentator on gender issues in Norwegian media, and has been an op-ed columnist for Klassekampen and other publications.

Bolsø gained international ridicule following her appearance in the 2010 Norwegian documentary series Hjernevask ('Brainwash: Gay/Straight'), in which she discussed her so-called theories against biological research data.

== Selected publications ==
- Folk flest er skeive. Queer teori og politikk (in Norwegian), Oslo: Manifest, 2010, ISBN 9788292866252
- ‘The Politics of Lesbian Specificity’, Journal of Homosexuality, nr1 / 2 vol 54, s49-67 (2008).
- ‘Identitet og homopolitikk etter queer’, Tidsskrift for kjønnsforskning (4) s. 50-70 (2007)
- ’Approaches to penetration – theoretical difference in practice’, Sexualities vol 10 (5) s559-581 (2007)
- ’Orgasmer, lesbiske og kjønnsmakt’, in A. Ohnstad og K. Malterud (ed) Lesbiske og homofile i møte med helse- og sosialtenesta, s41-61. Oslo, Samlaget (2006).
- 'Orgasm and lesbian sociality', Sex Education, vol 5, no. 1, February, pp. 29–48 (2005).
- 'Jorun Solheim og Judith Butler - en refleksjon over åpne kropper og det falliske'. Tidsskrift for kjønnsforskning, nr. 4 (2005).
- ’Salg av seksuelle tjenester mellom kvinner’, Kvinneforskning, nr 1, s43-61 (2004).
- ’Pornografi og feministisk kritikk’. Kvinneforskning, nr. 1, 26-31 (2003).
- ’Orgasme og lesbisk sosialitet’, Sosiologi i dag, vol. 33, nr 1, s37-63 (2003).
- Power in the Erotic: Feminism and Lesbian Practice, dissertation, NTNU, 2002
- ’When women take: Lesbians reworking Concepts of Sexuality’, Sexualities, vol 4(4), p455-473 (2001).
- ’Maskulinitet i erotisk spill mellom kvinner’, Kvinneforskning, nr 3–4, s88-105 (2000).
- 'Bygdesamfunnet’, i R. Almås (red), Arbeidsmiljøet i landbruket, s27-31, Oslo, Landbruksforlaget (1993).
- En søkende arbeider? Om ferieavløserne i jordbruket. University of Trondheim (1981).
