= John Ole Moe =

Norwegian footballer (born 1963)

Personal information
- Date of birth: 25 April 1963 (age 63)
- Height: 1.95 m (6 ft 5 in)
- Position: Goalkeeper

Youth career
- –1979: Drøbak-Frogn

Senior career*
Years	Team	Apps	(Gls)
1980	Moss		
1981–1982	Vålerenga		
1983	HamKam	0	(0)
1983	Vålerenga		
1984–1985	Strømsgodset		
1986	Drøbak-Frogn		
- Boston University Terriers
1988–1990	Lyn		
1993	Lyn	1	(0)

International career
1979	Norway u-16	3	(0)
1980	Norway u-19	1	(0)
- * Club domestic league appearances and goals

John Ole Moe (born 25 April 1963) is a retired Norwegian football goalkeeper.

He started his youth career in Drøbak-Frogn IL and represented Norway as a youth international. Ahead of the 1980 season he joined Moss FK, and already in 1981 he went on to a second-choice spot in Vålerenga IF. Ahead of the 1983 season he signed for Hamarkameratene, but as the clubs never agreed on the prize, the prize was set by a Football Association tribunal. Hamarkameratene refused to pay this prize as well, and Moe re-signed for Vålerenga just as the season started. In 1984 he joined Strømsgodset IF, played university soccer at Boston University, and rejoined Drøbak-Frogn in 1986.

From 1988 to 1990 he played for SFK Lyn. He then retired, and only played one post-retirement match, in the 1993 Eliteserien.
