= Leif Edward Ottesen Kennair =

Norwegian psychologist

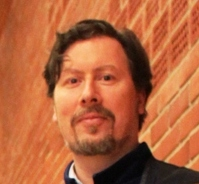
Leif Edward Ottesen Kennair

Leif Edward Ottesen Kennair (born 19 March 1970) is a Norwegian psychologist and professor of personality psychology at the Norwegian University of Science and Technology (NTNU).

Kennair's academic research focuses on clinical psychology and evolutionary psychology. His body of work encompasses the treatment of obsessive–compulsive disorder (OCD), anxiety and depression, alongside investigations into jealousy, sexual behaviour, sexual harassment, and the hormonal influences on human sexuality. In 2010, he featured as a commentator on the Norwegian Broadcasting Corporation (NRK) TV series Hjernevask (Brainwashing).
