= Geir Ludvig Aasen Ouren =

Norwegian cross-country skier

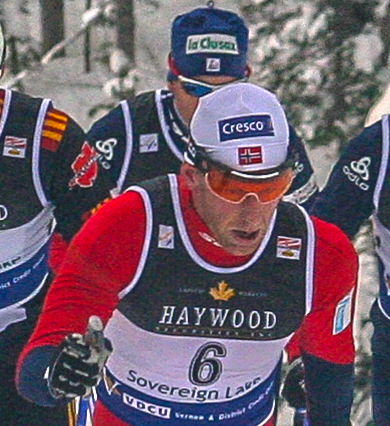
- Aasen Ouren in 2005

Personal information
- Nationality: Norway
- Born: 26 August 1974 (age 51) Kristiansand, Norway

Sport
- Sport: Skiing
- Club: Øvrebø IL

World Cup career
- Seasons: 12 – (2000–2011)
- Indiv. starts: 44
- Indiv. podiums: 0
- Team starts: 11
- Team podiums: 0
- Overall titles: 0 – (22nd in 2006)
- Discipline titles: 0

Geir Ludvig Aasen Ouren (born 26 August 1974) is a Norwegian cross-country skier who has competed since 1999. His best World Cup finish was fifth on four occasions between 2004 and 2009.

== Cross-country skiing results ==
All results are sourced from the International Ski Federation (FIS).

=== World Cup ===
==== Season standings ====
| Season | Age | Discipline standings | | | | | Ski Tour standings | | |
| Season | Age | Overall | Distance | Long Distance | Middle Distance | Sprint | Nordic Opening | Tour de Ski | World Cup Final |
|---|---|---|---|---|---|---|---|---|---|
| 2000 | 25 | NC | —N/a | — | — | NC | —N/a | —N/a | —N/a |
| 2001 | 26 | NC | —N/a | —N/a | —N/a | NC | —N/a | —N/a | —N/a |
| 2002 | 27 | NC | —N/a | —N/a | —N/a | — | —N/a | —N/a | —N/a |
| 2003 | 28 | NC | —N/a | —N/a | —N/a | — | —N/a | —N/a | —N/a |
| 2004 | 29 | 125 | 84 | —N/a | —N/a | — | —N/a | —N/a | —N/a |
| 2005 | 30 | 155 | 97 | —N/a | —N/a | — | —N/a | —N/a | —N/a |
| 2006 | 31 | 22 | 13 | —N/a | —N/a | — | —N/a | —N/a | —N/a |
| 2007 | 32 | 99 | 59 | —N/a | —N/a | — | —N/a | — | —N/a |
| 2008 | 33 | 127 | 72 | —N/a | —N/a | — | —N/a | — | — |
| 2009 | 34 | 83 | 50 | —N/a | —N/a | — | —N/a | — | — |
| 2010 | 35 | 90 | 50 | —N/a | —N/a | — | —N/a | — | — |
| 2011 | 36 | NC | NC | —N/a | —N/a | — | — | — | — |
