= Colin N'kee =

Norwegian footballer (born 1991)

Personal information
- Full name: Colin N'kee-Ngelingono
- Date of birth: 14 January 1991 (age 35)
- Place of birth: Oslo, Norway
- Height: 1.81 m (5 ft 11 1/2 in)
- Position: Forward

Team information
- Current team: Kjelsås
- Number: 17

Youth career
- Lørenskog
- –2009: Lillestrøm

Senior career*
| Years | Team | Apps | (Gls) |
| 2009–2010 | Lillestrøm | 0 | (0) |
| 2011–2012 | Stømsgodset | 4 | (0) |
| 2012 | → Strømmen (loan) | 13 | (3) |
| 2012 | → Lørenskog (loan) | 6 | (2) |
| 2016– | Kjelsås | | |
- * Club domestic league appearances and goals

Colin N'kee (born 14 January 1991 in Oslo) is a Norwegian footballer.
