= Morten Wivestad =

Norwegian footballer (born 1973)

Personal information
- Full name: Morten Johan Wivestad
- Date of birth: 8 September 1973 (age 53)
- Height: 1.88 m (6 ft 2 in)
- Position: Defender

Youth career
- –1990: Ørn-Horten

Senior career*
Years	Team	Apps	(Gls)
1991–1996	Ørn-Horten		
1997−2002	Lyn	46	(2)
- * Club domestic league appearances and goals

Morten Wivestad (born 10 November 1973) is a football agent and retired Norwegian football defender.

He started his career in Ørn-Horten and was drafted into the senior team in 1991. From 1997 to 2002 he played for Lyn, recording 9 games in the 1997 Norwegian Premier League. He did not play any matches during his last two seasons.

After retiring Wivestad became a football agent, among others for Jørgen Skjelvik, Ghayas Zahid, Sander Berge, Håkon Evjen and Filip Delaveris. Also an agent for coaches, Wivestad was the agent when SK Brann signed Rikard Norling in late 2013.
