= IL Kvernbit =

Norwegian football club

Home colours

I.L Kvernbit is a Norwegian football club, from the rural village Frekhaug in Hordaland.

The team resides at the fifth level of the Norwegian league system, despite numerous attempts at promotion. Although Kvernbit is from Frekhaug, many of its most prominent players, come from the smaller island Flatøy.

Perhaps the greatest player to ever wear the Kvernbit jersey, is the Stanghelle-born Trond Egil Soltvedt, who made a surprising move from Sheffield Wednesday, to Frekhaug and Kvernbit. He then managed to save the club from being relegated to the sixth Division.

The name Kvernbit means stonecutter, and is named after the sword of Haakon the good.

== The new era ==
Thanks to the generous billionaire Trond Mohn, Kvernbit got several new facilities such as two artificial turf fields, and an indoor sports arena called Meland Aktiv. This has led to a much more professional take on managing the club, including the employment of Trond Egil Soltvedt as a full-time general manager.
