= Lars Sørlien =

Norwegian footballer (born 1980)

Personal information
- Full name: Lars Tjugum Sørlien
- Date of birth: 12 April 1980 (age 46)
- Position: Midfielder

Youth career
- –1999: Kongsvinger

Senior career*
Years	Team	Apps	(Gls)
1998–2002	Kongsvinger	62	(8)
2003	NTNUI		
2004	Nidelv		
- * Club domestic league appearances and goals

Lars Tjugum Sørlien (born 12 April 1980) is a retired Norwegian football midfielder.

Coming through the junior ranks of Kongsvinger, he made his senior debut in the 1998 UEFA Intertoto Cup against FC Twente. He did not become a team regular until Kongsvinger were relegated to the 1. divisjon. In addition to 62 league games he featured in 3 cup games. In 2003 he moved to the Trondheim university sports club NTNUI, finishing his career in neighboring team Nidelv IL.
