= Glenn Wilson (psychologist) =

British psychologist

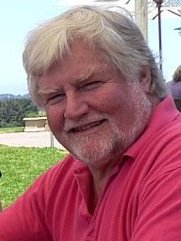
- Born: 29 December 1942 (age 83); Christchurch, New Zealand
- Education: University of Canterbury
- Occupations: Evolutionary psychologist Media commentator

Glenn Daniel Wilson (born 29 December 1942) is a New Zealand-British psychologist best known for his work on attitude and personality measurement, sexual attraction, deviation and dysfunction, partner compatibility, and psychology applied to performing arts. He is a fellow of the British Psychological Society and makes frequent media appearances as a psychology expert, especially in TV news and documentaries.

== Biography ==
After graduating MA at the University of Canterbury, Christchurch, Wilson moved to London in 1967 to study for his PhD under the supervision of Hans Eysenck, with whom he subsequently collaborated on a number of research projects and co-authored six books. He also co-authored the Eysenck Personality Profiler, a standard personality test used in clinical research and industry. With John Patterson, he devised the Wilson–Patterson Conservatism Scale, which has been widely used as a measure of social attitudes. In 1973 he proposed the theory that a heritable trait reflecting fear of uncertainty underlies social attitudes across many fields. Together with G.Knyazev and H.Slobodskaya of the Russian Academy of Medical Sciences, Wilson has researched the EEG correlates of personality and produced a theory of the evolution of brain oscillations.

In a study conducted before leaving New Zealand, Wilson showed that classical fear conditioning in humans can be overridden by verbal reassurances of "safety". This initiated a continuing field of research concerned with the power of cognitive expectations to control anxiety that underlies the rationale of cognitive behavioral therapy.

Wilson studied evolutionary approaches to understanding human sex differences and mating behaviour in 1981, His 1975 study on the bust-waist ratio as an objective index of female sexual attractiveness presaged the waist–hip ratio, now used as an oestrogen (fertility) marker. His studies of sex fantasy yielded the Wilson Sex Fantasy Questionnaire. With Peter Fenwick and others at the Institute of Psychiatry, he studied men with normal and paraphilic interests, and how they differed in their EEG responses to erotic images in certain brain areas.

Noting that men and women had different finger length patterns, Wilson introduced the 2D/4D digit ratio as a marker of exposure to prenatal testosterone in 1983. His theory that autism represented a hypermale brain was influential in autism studies, but has now been widely discredited. He worked with Jon Cousins to develop the compatibility quotient (CQ) in 2003, which was designed as a predictor of relationship success. With Qazi Rahman, Wilson has published research supporting the conclusion that sexual orientation is of constitutional origin.

Wilson is a part-time professional baritone singer, and has taught courses on Psychology of Performance. He wrote a textbook on the subject, Psychology for Performing Artists (Wiley, 2002) which is in its second edition.

From 2009 to 2014 Wilson was Visiting Professor of Psychology at Gresham College, London. Prior to that (1994-2008), he was Reader in Personality at the Institute of Psychiatry, King's College, University of London. He has held visiting appointments at several American institutions, including California State University, Los Angeles, Stanford University, San Francisco State University, Sierra Nevada College and the University of Nevada, Reno, where he was Adjunct Professor for many years.

== Selected works ==
- Eysenck, Hans J.; Wilson, Glenn D. (1973). The Experimental Study of Freudian Theories. London: Methuen & Co Ltd (SBN 416780105).
- Wilson, Glenn D. (1974). Improve Your IQ. London: Futura.
- Eysenck, Hans J.; Wilson, Glenn D. (1976). A Textbook of Human Psychology. Lancaster: MTP Press.
- Eysenck, Hans J.; Wilson, Glenn D. (1976). Know your own personality. Harmondsworth, Eng. Baltimore etc: Penguin Books. ISBN 9780140219623.
- Wilson, Glenn; Nias, David K. B. (1976). Love's mysteries : the psychology of sexual attraction. London: Open Books. ISBN 9780729100250.
- Wilson, Glenn (1978). The secrets of sexual fantasy. London: Dent. ISBN 9780460043090.
- Wilson, Glenn D.; Grylls, Diana (1977). Know your child's IQ. London: Futura Publications. ISBN 9780708809822.
- Eysenck, Hans J.; Wilson, Glenn D. (1978). The Psychological basis of ideology. Baltimore: University Park Press. ISBN 9780839112211.
- Wilson, Glenn D.; Cook, Mark (1979). Love and attraction : an international conference. Oxford New York: Pergamon Press. ISBN 9780080222349.
- Eysenck, Hans J.; Wilson, Glenn D. (1979). The psychology of sex. London: J. M. Dent. ISBN 9780460043328.
- Wilson, Glenn D.; Gosselin, Chris (1980). Sexual variations : fetishism, sadomasochism, and transvestism. New York: Simon & Schuster. ISBN 9780671246242.
- Wilson, Glenn D. (1981). Love and instinct. London: Temple Smith. ISBN 9780851172095.
- Wilson, Glenn (1982). The Coolidge effect : an evolutionary account of human sexuality. New York: Morrow. ISBN 9780688010232.
- Wilson, Glenn D.; Cox, David N. (1983). The child-lovers : a study of paedophiles in society. London Boston: Peter Owen. ISBN 9780720606034.
- Wilson, Glenn (1985). The psychology of the performing arts. New York: St. Martin's. ISBN 9780312653163.
- Wilson, Glenn Ed. (1987). Variant sexuality : research and theory. London: Croom Helm. ISBN 9780709936985.
- Wilson, Glenn (1989). Your personality & potential: the illustrated guide to self discovery. Topsfield, Mass: Salem House Publishers. ISBN 9780881623703.
- Wilson, Glenn (1992). The great sex divide : a study of male-female differences. Washington, D.C.: Scott-Townsend Publishers. ISBN 9781878465047.
- Wilson, Glenn Ed. (1991). Psychology and performing arts. Amsterdam Berwyn, PA: Swets & Zeitlinger. ISBN 9026511191.
- Wilson, Glenn (1994). Psychology for performing artists : butterflies and bouquets. London Philadelphia: J. Kingsley Publishers. ISBN 9781853021664.
- Wilson, Glenn (1994). Your personality quiz book : find out what makes you tick. London: Headway. ISBN 9780340604861.
- Wilson, Glenn D.; McLaughlin, Chris (1995). Better sex : the erotic education you never had. London: Bloomsbury. ISBN 9780747520481.
- Wilson, Glenn D.; McLaughlin, Chris (1996). Winning with body language. City: Bloomsbury. ISBN 9780747525776.
- Wilson, Glenn D.; Evans, Andrew (1999). Fame : the psychology of stardom. London: Vision Paperbacks. ISBN 9781901250244.
- Wilson, Glenn D.; McLaughlin, Chris (2001). The science of love. London: Fusion Press. ISBN 9781901250541.
- Wilson, Glenn (2012). Introducing Body Language : A Practical Guide. London: Icon Books. ISBN 9781848314214.
