= Trond Vinterstø =

Norwegian footballer (born 1973)

Personal information
- Date of birth: 28 December 1973 (age 52)
- Position: Defender

Youth career
- Øygard

Senior career*
Years	Team	Apps	(Gls)
1992–1994	Fyllingen		
1994–2003	Nest-Sotra		
2007–2009	FK Jerv		
2010–	Imås		

International career
1989	Norway u-16	12	(1)
1990	Norway u-17	4	(0)

Managerial career
- 2010–: Imås (player-coach)
- * Club domestic league appearances and goals

Trond Vinterstø (born 28 December 1973) is a Norwegian retired football defender.

Vinterstø started his youth career in Øygard and represented Norway as a youth international. In 1992 he transferred to Fyllingen. Managing promotion to the 1993 Tippeligaen, Vinterstø got 11 games there. His career was mostly spent in Nest-Sotra from 1994 through 2003.

After the 2003 season he packed up and moved to Grimstad. He did not play football until 2007, when he joined Jerv. In 2010 he went on to minnows Imås as player-coach.
