= Karl Erik Rimfeldt =

Norwegian footballer (born 1980)

Personal information
- Date of birth: 16 February 1980 (age 46)
- Position: Defender

Team information
- Current team: Vinger

Youth career
- Kongsvinger

Senior career*
Years	Team	Apps	(Gls)
1999–2000	Kongsvinger	13	(0)
- Sander
2008–present	Vinger		
- * Club domestic league appearances and goals

Karl Erik Rimfeldt (born 16 February 1980) is a retired Norwegian football defender.

He started his career in Kongsvinger IL, and played for Norwegian youth national teams. He joined the senior squad in 1999, and played three Norwegian Premier League games in 1999. He played one more season before leaving. He has later played on lower levels for Sander IL and Vinger FK.
