= Stig Frøland =

Norwegian professor of medicine (born 1940)

Stig Sophus Frøland (born 31 July 1940) is a Norwegian professor of medicine.

He was born in Sør-Odal Municipality as a brother of Dag Frøland. He took the dr.med. degree in 1973 and specialist qualification in internal medicine in 1980, later also in infectious diseases in 1983. He has served as chief physician at Rikshospitalet from 1986 and professor at the University of Oslo from 1993 to his retirement.

He was decorated as a Commander of the Order of St. Olav in 2012. He is a fellow of the Norwegian Academy of Science and Letters.

In addition to many research publications, he has authored two books on HIV/AIDs and microbial disease in Norwegian. His latest book, Duel Without End: Mankind's Battle with Microbes (2020), was translated into English in 2022 by John Irons and explores the history of humanity and infectious diseases.
