= Pål Anders Stubsveen =

Norwegian footballer (born 1981)

Pål Anders Stubsveen (born 8 May 1981) is a Norwegian football defender who currently plays for Borgar in the Norwegian Third Division.

He played for local club Hafslund IF before joining Moss, where he appeared in a single Eliteserien game in 2000. He then joined Borg Fotball, and later, in 2004, Sparta Sarpsborg. He appeared for Sparta Sarpsborg in the Norwegian First Division, but left in early 2008.
