= Øyvind Østerud =

Norwegian political scientist (1944–2025)

- Born: 27 April 1944; Nes, Norway
- Died: 23 June 2025 (aged 81)
- Occupation: Political scientist

Øyvind Østerud (27 April 1944 – 23 June 2025) was a Norwegian political scientist.

== Life and career ==
Østerud was born in Nes on 27 April 1944. His parents were barrister Helge Østerud and Olga-Sofie Østerud nee Scharning. He married Kirsten Thorsen in 1970.

A professor of political science at the University of Oslo from 1980, Østerud’s research interests were nationalism, geopolitics and international conflicts, and international politics. He chaired the research project Makt- og demokratiutredningen from 1998 to 2003. He was a fellow of the Norwegian Academy of Science and Letters and served as its praeses from 2008 to 2011.

Østerud died on 23 June 2025, at the age of 81.
