= Tor Sveen =

Norwegian footballer (born 1962)

Personal information
- Full name: Tor Sveen
- Date of birth: 22 November 1962 (age 63)
- Position: Striker

Youth career
- 1970–: Fossum

Senior career*
| Years | Team | Apps | (Gls) |
| –1979 | Fossum | | |
| 1980–1982 | Lyn | 26 | (3) |
| 1983–1992 | Fossum | | |
- * Club domestic league appearances and goals

Tor Sveen (born 22 November 1962) is a retired Norwegian football striker.

He started his career in Fossum IF in 1970, and eventually played for the senior team. He played for SFK Lyn between 1980 and 1982, the two first years in the First Division (highest tier). He scored one goal in each of his three seasons. After that he returned to Fossum, and played until 1992. In his last year the team played in the Second Division (third tier), an all-time high.
