= Geir Sundal =

Norwegian footballer (born 1968)

Geir Sundal (born 1968) is a retired Norwegian football defender.

He played for IL Hødd as early as in 1985. He eventually became team captain. He participated in their promotion to the highest level after the 1994 season. He played some matches in the 1995 Norwegian Premier League. He later became sporting director in Hødd.
