= Trond Amundsen (biologist) =

Norwegian biologist

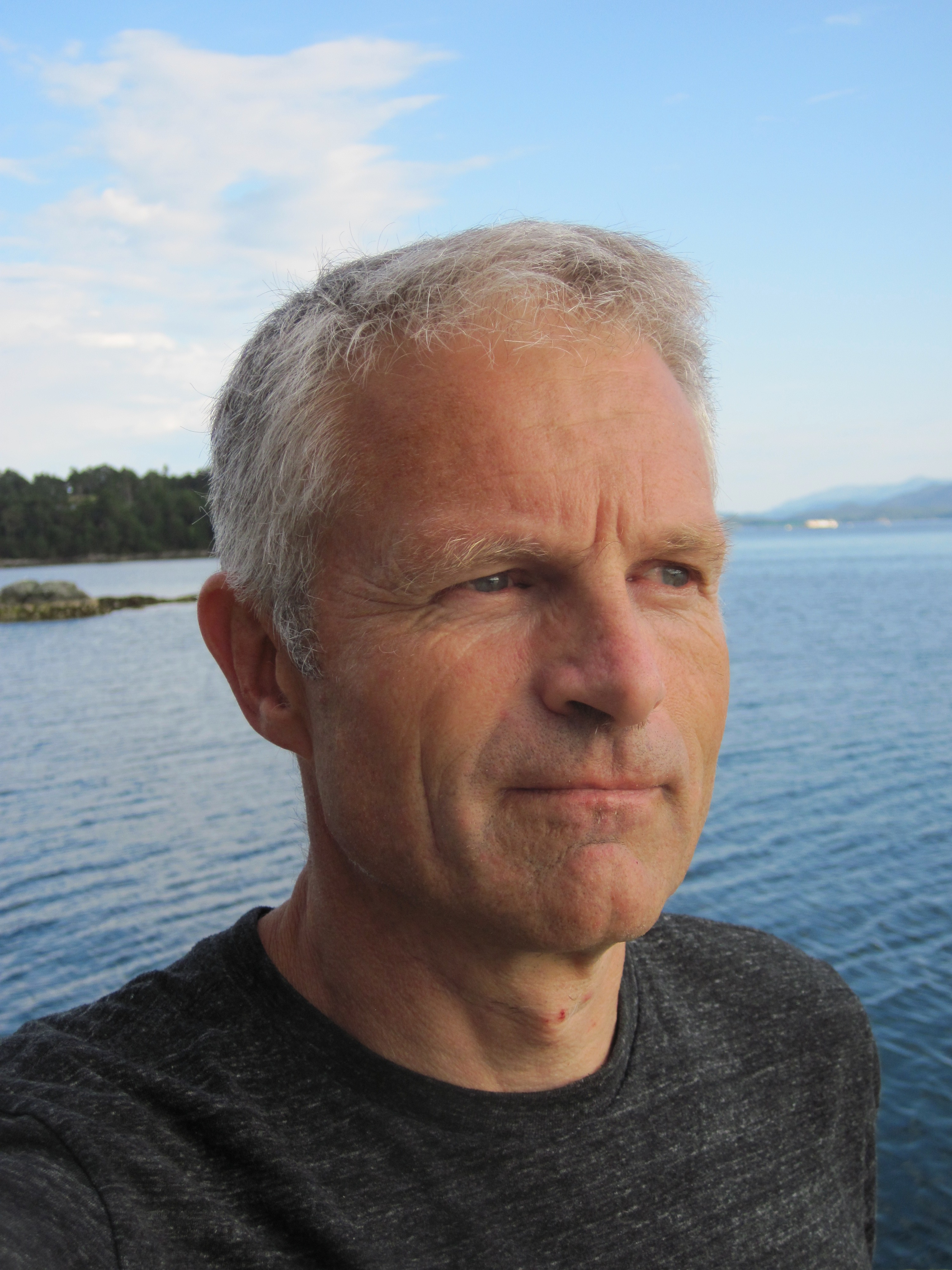
Trond Amundsen in 2013

Trond Amundsen (born 7 February 1957) is a Norwegian biologist, and a professor of biology at the Norwegian University of Science and Technology (NTNU). He specializes in ethology. He is a member of the Royal Norwegian Society of Sciences and Letters. He has also been very active in disseminating knowledge about behavior, ecology and evolution to the general public, and in general public discourse on research, and in 2018 he was awarded NTNU's prize for research dissemination.

== Career ==
Amundsen earned his PhD in biology at the University of Oslo in 1994 and became an associate professor at Department of Biology at NTNU in 1991. He became full professor of biology at NTNU in 1998.

His research studies animal behavior in an ecological and evolutionary perspective, focusing on how the animals' behavior is adapted to their physical, biological and social environment. He has especially worked with issues related to parental care, life history and above all sexual selection, namely how animal behavior, appearance and gender roles are shaped by competition for partners. Amundsen has shown that sexual selection can promote color splendor and competition also in females of different animal species, and not only in males. He and his colleagues have shown that sexual selection can be dynamic in time and space, with stronger competition among males when there is a shortage of females, and stronger competition among females when there is a shortage of males.

According to Google Scholar, he has been cited over 5,000 times.
