= Finnås Municipality =

Former municipality in Hordaland, Norway

Finnås Municipality Finnaas Municipality Finnås herred Finnaas herred
- Former municipality
- Findaas herred (historic name)
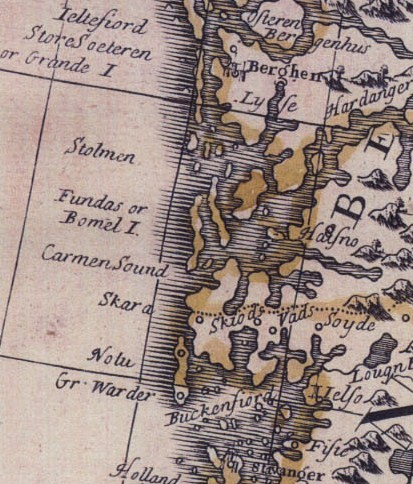
- A 1720 map showing "Fundas or Bomel I."

- Hordaland within Norway

- Finnås within Hordaland
- Coordinates: 59°47′34″N 05°10′20″E
- Country: Norway
- County: Hordaland
- District: Sunnhordland
- Established: 1 Jan 1838
  - Created as: Formannskapsdistrikt
- Disestablished: 1 July 1916
  - Succeeded by: Bremnes, Moster, and Bømlo municipalities
- Administrative centre: Finnås

Government
  - Mayor (1914–1916): B.O. Meling

Area (upon dissolution)
  - Total: 231 km^{2} (89 sq mi)
- Highest elevation: 473.92 m (1,554.9 ft)

Population (1916)
  - Total: 5,944
  - Density: 25.7/km^{2} (66.6/sq mi)
- Time zone: UTC+01:00 (CET)
  - Summer (DST): UTC+02:00 (CEST)
- ISO 3166 code: NO-1218

Finnås is a former municipality in the old Hordaland county, Norway. The 231-square-kilometre (89 sq mi) municipality existed from 1838 until its dissolution in 1916. The area is now part of the present-day Bømlo Municipality in the traditional district of Sunnhordland in Vestland county. The administrative centre was the village of Mosterhamn.

The Kulleseid Canal is a canal that was built in the 1800s on a small isthmus on the island of Bømlo. It enabled boats to journey between the east and west sides of Bømlo island. Today the channel is surrounded by a small trading center and tourist center, and it is a popular guest harbor.

== General information ==
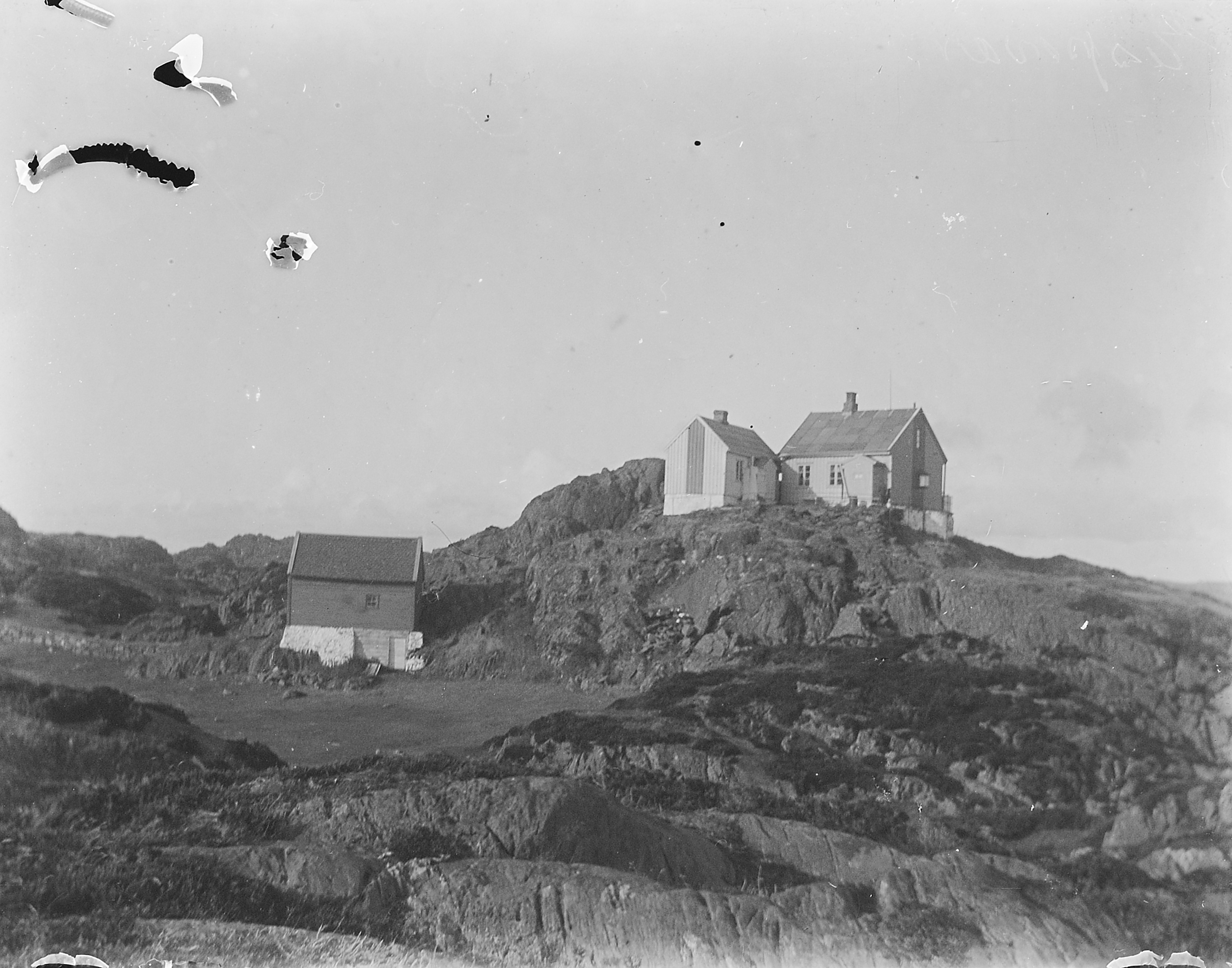
View of Espevær c. 1900

The parish of Finnaas (later spelled Finnås) was established as a municipality on 1 January 1838 (see formannskapsdistrikt law). In 1865, Finnaas Municipality was divided into two parts as follows:

- the southern mainland district of Finnaas (population: 2,237) plus the Vikebygd area of the neighboring Fjelberg Municipality (population: 1,062) became the new Sveen Municipality
- the northern island district remained as a smaller Finnaas Municipality

On 1 January 1868, a small part of Finnaas Municipality (population: 10) was transferred to the neighboring Fitje Municipality. On 1 April 1870, the Øklandsgrend area (population: 247) was transferred from Finnaas Municipality to the neighboring Valestrand Municipality.

On 1 July 1916, Finnaas Municipality was dissolved and its lands were divided to create three new (smaller) municipalities as follows:

- Bremnes Municipality (population: 3,411), the 120-square-kilometre (46 sq mi) northern/western half of the island of Bømlo and smaller surrounding islands
- Moster Municipality (population: 1,316), the 67-square-kilometre (26 sq mi) southeastern peninsula on the island of Bømlo, the island of Moster, and the smaller surrounding islands
- Bømmel Municipality (population: 1,217), the 38.5-square-kilometre (14.9 sq mi) southwestern peninsula on the island of Bømlo and smaller surrounding islands (later renamed Bømlo Municipality).

On 1 January 1963, the three municipalities were merged back together again to for a new, larger Bømlo Municipality.

=== Name ===
The municipality (originally the parish) is named after the Finnaas farm since the Old Moster Church was built there. The name is relative new name with very little historical record. The first element is finn which is the local name for a type of grass known as Nardus stricta. The last element is ås which means "hill". Thus it means a hill with "finn" grass.

During its time as a municipality, it was always spelled as Findaas or Finnaas. On 21 December 1917 (after the municipality had been dissolved and merged into Bømlo), a royal resolution enacted the 1917 Norwegian language reforms. Prior to this change, the name was spelled Finnaas with the digraph "aa", and after this reform, the name was spelled Finnås, using the letter å instead. Since then, when referring to the old municipality, the new spelling is usually used, but the letter "å" was never used while the municipality existed.

=== Churches ===
The Church of Norway had three parishes (sokn) within Finnaas Municipality. At the time of the municipal dissolution, it was part of the Finnaas prestegjeld and the Søndre Sunnhordland prosti (deanery) in the Diocese of Bjørgvin.

Churches in Finnaas Municipality
Parish (sokn)	Church name	Location of the church	Year built
Bremnes	Bremnes Church	Bremnes	1869
Bremnes	Lykling Chapel	Lykling	1912
Bømlo	Bømlo Church	Langevåg	1621
Moster	Moster Church	Mosterhamn	1874
Moster	Old Moster Church	Mosterhamn	c. 1100

== Geography ==
Originally, the municipality encompassed all of the island of Bømlo, the island of Moster, the small surrounding islands, and the mainland located south of the Bømlafjorden. In 1865, the mainland parts of Finnaas Municipality were removed, leaving a municipality of islands. The highest point in the municipality was the 473.92-metre (1,554.9 ft) tall mountain Siggjo on the island of Bømlo.

Fitjar Municipality was located to the north, Stord Municipality was located to the east, Valestrand Municipality was located to the southeast, Sveio Municipality was located to the south, and the North Sea was located to the west.

== Government ==
While it existed, Finnaas Municipality was governed by a municipal council of directly elected representatives. The mayor was indirectly elected by a vote of the municipal council. The municipality was under the jurisdiction of the Gulating Court of Appeal.

=== Mayors ===
The mayor (Nynorsk: ordførar) of Finnaas Municipality was the political leader of the municipality and the chairperson of the municipal council. The following people have held this position:

- 1838–1840: Rev. Niels Nielsen Vogt
- 1849–1849: Gudmund Eriksen Habbestad
- 1850–1851: Rev. Kolstad
- 1852–1855: E. Jacobsen Øklandsvaag
- 1858–1860: Halvor J. Vornæs
- 1861–1866: Ole Ingemarsen Gaaseland
- 1878–1887: Ole M. Søndre-Sille
- 1888–1901: J. Thorsheim
- 1902–1904: B.O. Meling
- 1905–1907: J. Thorsheim
- 1908–1913: E. Olsen
- 1914–1916: B.O. Meling

== Notable people ==
- Haldor Andreas Haldorsen (1883–1965), a politician elected to the Norwegian Parliament from Hordaland
- Ola Olsen (1891–1973), a politician elected to the Norwegian Parliament from Hordaland
- Gerhard Meidell Gerhardsen (1885–1931), a bailiff and politician for the Conservative Party and Centre Party
- Gerhard Meidell Gerhardsen (1912–1986), an economist

== See also ==
- List of former municipalities of Norway
