= Bremnes =

Bremnes may refer to:

== Places ==
- Bremnes Municipality, a former municipality (1916–1963) in the old Hordaland county, Norway
- Bremnes, or Svortland, a village in Bømlo municipality in Vestland county, Norway
- Bremnes Church, a church in Bømlo municipality in Vestland county, Norway
- Bremnes, Nordland, a village in Sortland municipality in Nordland county, Norway
- Bremnes, Troms, a village in Kvæfjord municipality in Troms county, Norway

== People ==
- Dan Bremnes, Canadian Christian musician
- Kari Bremnes (born 1956), a Norwegian singer and songwriter

== Other ==
- Bremnes IL, a Norwegian sports club from Bømlo in Vestland county, Norway
- MV Bremnes, a cargo ship that was built in 1939 and owned by the Norwegian government during the 1940s
