= Bremnes Municipality =

Former municipality in Hordaland, Norway

Bremnes Municipality Bremnes herad
- Former municipality
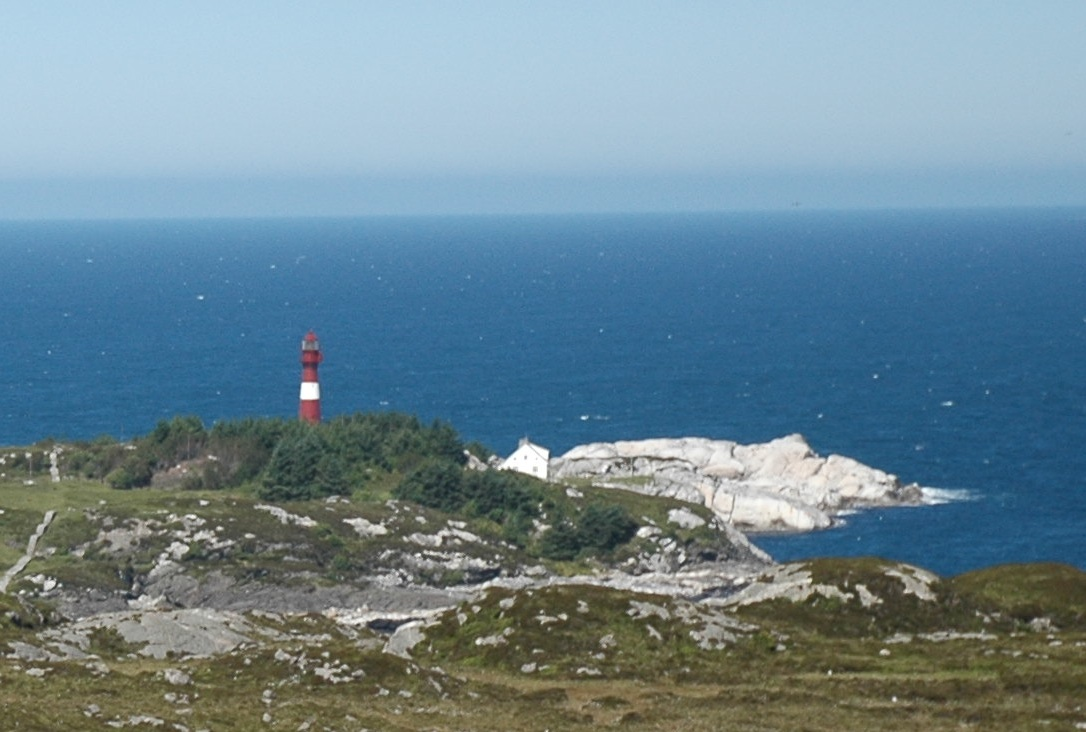
- View of the Slåtterøy Lighthouse

- Hordaland within Norway

- Bremnes within Hordaland
- Coordinates: 59°47′34″N 05°10′20″E
- Country: Norway
- County: Hordaland
- District: Sunnhordland
- Established: 1 July 1916
  - Preceded by: Finnaas Municipality
- Disestablished: 1 Jan 1963
  - Succeeded by: Bømlo Municipality
- Administrative centre: Svortland

Government
  - Mayor (1951–1962): Peder P. Staveland (V)

Area (upon dissolution)
  - Total: 125.3 km^{2} (48.4 sq mi)
  - Rank: #475 in Norway
- Highest elevation: 164 m (538 ft)

Population (1962)
  - Total: 4,823
  - Rank: #184 in Norway
  - Density: 38.5/km^{2} (100/sq mi)
  - Change (10 years): ▲ +3.8%
- Demonym: Bremnesing

Official language
  - Norwegian form: Nynorsk
- Time zone: UTC+01:00 (CET)
  - Summer (DST): UTC+02:00 (CEST)
- ISO 3166 code: NO-1220

Bremnes is a former municipality in the old Hordaland county, Norway. The 125.3-square-kilometre (48.4 sq mi) municipality existed from 1916 until its dissolution in 1963. The area is now part of Bømlo Municipality in the traditional district of Sunnhordland in Vestland county. The administrative centre was the village of Bremnes. Other villages in the municipality included Rubbestadneset and Lykling.

Prior to its dissolution in 1963, the 125.3-square-kilometre (48.4 sq mi) municipality was the 475th largest by area out of the 705 municipalities in Norway. Bremnes Municipality was the 184th most populous municipality in Norway with a population of about 4,823. The municipality's population density was 38.5 inhabitants per square kilometre (100/sq mi) and its population had increased by 3.8% over the previous 10-year period.

== General information ==
The municipality of Bremnes was established on 1 July 1916 when the old Finnaas Municipality was divided into the three new municipalities as follows:

- the southeastern district of Finnaas Municipality (population: 1,316) became the new Moster Municipality
- the southwestern district of Finnaas Municipaltiy (population: 1,217) became the new Bømmel Municipality
- the northern district of Finnaas Municipality (population: 3,411) became the new Bremnes Municipality

During the 1960s, there were many municipal mergers across Norway due to the work of the Schei Committee. On 1 January 1963, a large municipal merger took place and the following areas were merged to form a new, larger Bømlo Municipality:

- all of Moster Municipality (population: 1,834)
- all of Bømlo Municipality (population: 1,463)
- all of Bremnes Municipality (population: 4,829)

=== Name ===
The municipality is named Bremnes (Old Norse: Brimnes). The first element is brim which means "surf" or "the surface of the sea". It is a name that is common in Western Norway, referring to places that are highly exposed to the sea. The last element is nes which means "headland".

=== Churches ===
The Church of Norway had one parish (sokn) within Bremnes Municipality. At the time of the municipal dissolution, it was part of the Finnås prestegjeld and the Søndre Sunnhordland prosti (deanery) in the Diocese of Bjørgvin.

Churches in Bremnes Municipality
| Parish (sokn) | Church name | Location of the church | Year built |
|---|---|---|---|
| Bremnes | Bremnes Church | Bremnes | 1869 |
| Bremnes | Lykling Church | Lykling | 1912 |

== Geography ==
The 125-square-kilometre (48 sq mi) municipality covered the northern and western half of the island of Bømlo as well as the many small, surrounding islets. The highest point in the municipality was the 164-metre (538 ft) tall mountain Vardafjell. Fitjar Municipality is located to the northeast, Moster Municipality is located to the southeast, Bømlo Municipality is located to the south, and the North Sea is located to the west.

== Government ==
While it existed, Bremnes Municipality was responsible for primary education (through 10th grade), outpatient health services, senior citizen services, welfare and other social services, zoning, economic development, and municipal roads and utilities. The municipality was governed by a municipal council of directly elected representatives. The mayor was indirectly elected by a vote of the municipal council. The municipality was under the jurisdiction of the Sunnhordland District Court and Gulating Court of Appeal.

=== Municipal council ===
The municipal council (Heradsstyre) of Bremnes Municipality was made up of 23 representatives that were elected to four year terms. The tables below show the historical composition of the council by political party.

Bremnes heradsstyre 1959–1963
| Party name (in Nynorsk) | Number of representatives |
|---|---|
| Labour Party (Arbeidarpartiet) | 2 |
| Conservative Party (Høgre) | 2 |
| Christian Democratic Party (Kristeleg Folkeparti) | 8 |
| Liberal Party (Venstre) | 5 |
| Local List(s) (Lokale lister) | 6 |
| Total number of members: | 23 |
Note: On 1 January 1963, Bremnes Municipality became part of Bømlo Municipality.

Bremnes heradsstyre 1955–1959
| Party name (in Nynorsk) | Number of representatives |
|---|---|
| Labour Party (Arbeidarpartiet) | 1 |
| Conservative Party (Høgre) | 3 |
| Christian Democratic Party (Kristeleg Folkeparti) | 7 |
| Liberal Party (Venstre) | 5 |
| Local List(s) (Lokale lister) | 7 |
| Total number of members: | 23 |

Bremnes heradsstyre 1951–1955
| Party name (in Nynorsk) | Number of representatives |
|---|---|
| Labour Party (Arbeidarpartiet) | 1 |
| Christian Democratic Party (Kristeleg Folkeparti) | 3 |
| Liberal Party (Venstre) | 6 |
| Joint List(s) of Non-Socialist Parties (Borgarlege Felleslister) | 3 |
| Local List(s) (Lokale lister) | 7 |
| Total number of members: | 20 |

Bremnes heradsstyre 1947–1951
| Party name (in Nynorsk) | Number of representatives |
|---|---|
| Labour Party (Arbeidarpartiet) | 1 |
| Conservative Party (Høgre) | 2 |
| Christian Democratic Party (Kristeleg Folkeparti) | 5 |
| Liberal Party (Venstre) | 5 |
| Local List(s) (Lokale lister) | 7 |
| Total number of members: | 20 |

Bremnes heradsstyre 1945–1947
| Party name (in Nynorsk) | Number of representatives |
|---|---|
| Liberal Party (Venstre) | 8 |
| Local List(s) (Lokale lister) | 12 |
| Total number of members: | 20 |

Bremnes heradsstyre 1937–1941*
| Party name (in Nynorsk) | Number of representatives |
|---|---|
| Farmers' Party (Bondepartiet) | 5 |
| Liberal Party (Venstre) | 7 |
| Joint List(s) of Non-Socialist Parties (Borgarlege Felleslister) | 2 |
| Local List(s) (Lokale lister) | 6 |
| Total number of members: | 20 |
Note: Due to the German occupation of Norway during World War II, no elections were held for new municipal councils until after the war ended in 1945.

=== Mayors ===
The mayor (Nynorsk: ordførar) of Bremnes Municipality was the political leader of the municipality and the chairperson of the municipal council. The following people have held this position:

- 1916–1925: B.O. Meling
- 1925–1945: Andreas Halderaker
- 1945–1951: Øystein R. Steinsvåg
- 1951–1962: Peder P. Staveland (V)

== See also ==
- List of former municipalities of Norway
