= Bømlo =

Bømlo may refer to:

== Places ==
- Bømlo Municipality, a municipality in Vestland county, Norway
- Bømlo (island), an island in Bømlo Municipality in Vestland county, Norway
- Bømlo Church, a church in Bømlo Municipality in Vestland county, Norway
- Old Bømlo Church, a church in Bømlo Municipality in Vestland county, Norway

== Other ==
- Bømlo-nytt, a newspaper based in Bømlo Municipality in Vestland county, Norway
- Bømlo IL, a sports club based in Bømlo Municipality in Vestland county, Norway
