= Gerhard Meidell Gerhardsen =

Gerhard Meidell Gerhardsen may refer to:

- Gerhard Meidell Gerhardsen (1848–1912), Norwegian bailiff and politician for the Conservative Party
- Gerhard Meidell Gerhardsen (1885–1931), Norwegian bailiff and politician for the Conservative Party and Centre Party
- Gerhard Meidell Gerhardsen (economist) (1912–1986), Norwegian economist
