= Ola Olsen =

Norwegian politician

Ola Olsen (25 October 1891 – 13 April 1973) was a Norwegian politician for the Christian Democratic Party.

He was born in Finnaas Municipality (now part of Bømlo Municipality). He was elected to the Norwegian Parliament from Hordaland in 1954, and was re-elected once. He had previously served in the position of deputy representative during the term 1945–1949.

Olsen was a member of the municipal council of Bremnes Municipality from 1928 to 1931.
