= Bernt Mæland =

Norwegian footballer (1958–2026)

Personal information
- Date of birth: 24 July 1958
- Place of birth: Bømlo, Norway
- Date of death: 12 March 2026 (aged 67)
- Place of death: Varhaug, Norway
- Position: Forward

Youth career
- Bremnes

Senior career*
| Years | Team | Apps | (Gls) |
| 1976–1978 | Bremnes | | |
| 1979–1985 | Bryne | 111 | (35) |
| 1986–1987 | Viking | 25 | (1) |
| 1988 | Varhaug | | |
- * Club domestic league appearances and goals

Bernt Mæland (24 July 1958 – 12 March 2026) was a Norwegian footballer who played as a forward in the Norwegian top league for Bryne and Viking in the 1980s.

== Biography ==
Mæland was originally from Bømlo, and played for his local team Bremnes before joining Bryne in 1979. He played seven seasons for Bryne, and was a member of the Bryne side that finished second in the Norwegian league in 1980 and 1982. In 1982, he was Bryne's top scorer with nine goals. He also scored Bryne's equalizer as they managed a 1–1 draw against Anderlecht in the 1983–84 UEFA Cup. Mæland was never selected for the national team, but was named in the squad in 1983. In total, Mæland played 111 league games for Bryne and scored 35 goals.

After the 1985 season, Mæland joined Viking, but he was bothered by injuries and only played 25 league matches over two seasons, scoring just one goal. Incidentally, Mæland's only league goal for Viking came against his former team Bryne. After the 1987 season, Mæland retired from top-level football, but is reported to have played for Varhaug in the lower divisions.

Mæland died on 12 March 2026, at the age of 67.
