= Moster Municipality =

Former municipality in Hordaland, Norway

Moster Municipality Moster herad
- Former municipality
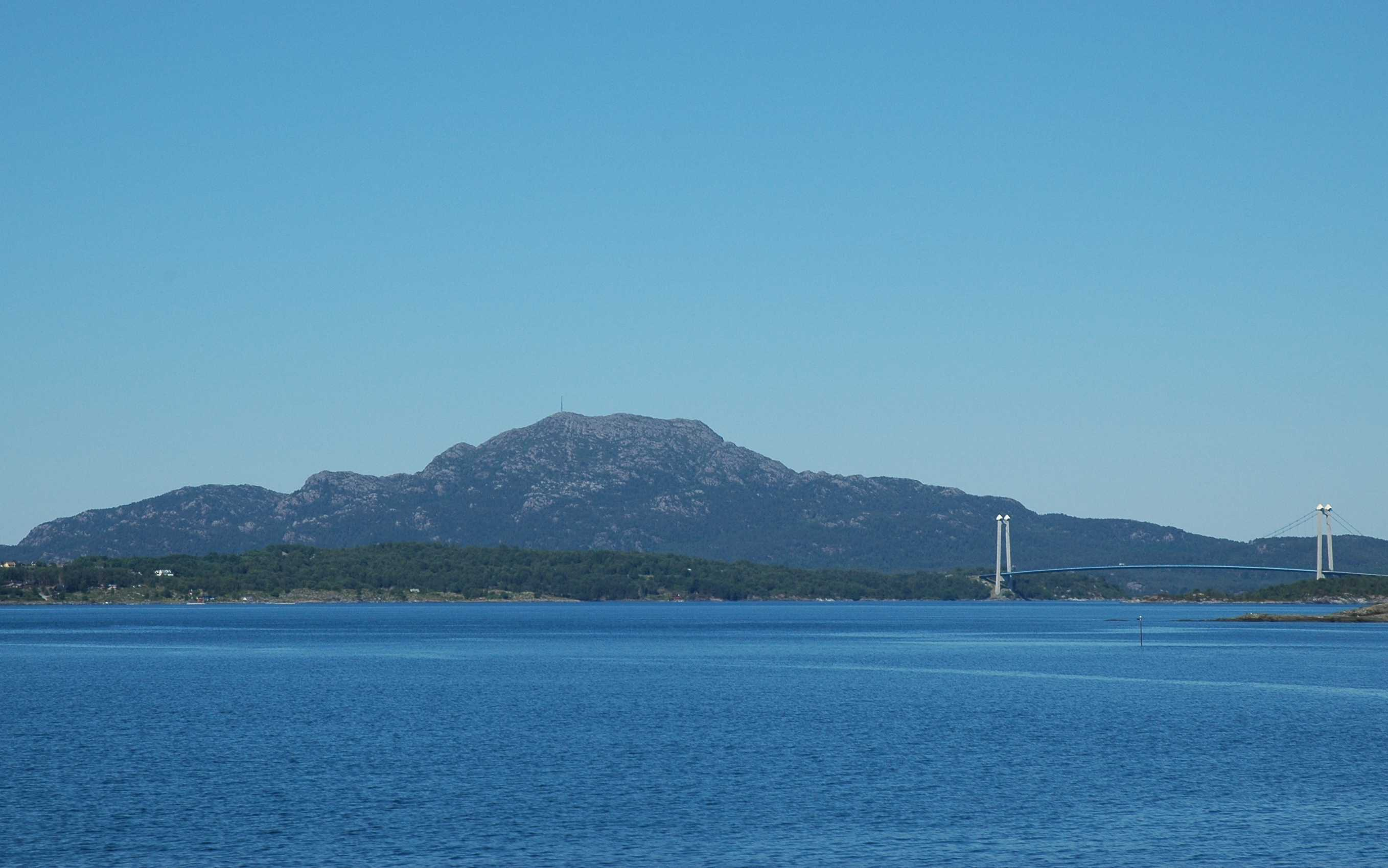
- Siggjo and Bømla bridge

- Hordaland within Norway

- Moster within Hordaland
- Coordinates: 59°41′57″N 05°23′08″E
- Country: Norway
- County: Hordaland
- District: Sunnhordland
- Established: 1 July 1916
  - Preceded by: Finnaas Municipality
- Disestablished: 1 Jan 1963
  - Succeeded by: Bømlo Municipality
- Administrative centre: Mosterhamn

Government
  - Mayor (1959–1963): Harald Gjerde

Area (upon dissolution)
  - Total: 65.5 km^{2} (25.3 sq mi)
  - Rank: #577 in Norway
- Highest elevation: 473.92 m (1,554.9 ft)

Population (1962)
  - Total: 1,841
  - Rank: #471 in Norway
  - Density: 28.1/km^{2} (73/sq mi)
  - Change (10 years): ▲ +5.3%
- Demonym: Mostring

Official language
  - Norwegian form: Nynorsk
- Time zone: UTC+01:00 (CET)
  - Summer (DST): UTC+02:00 (CEST)
- ISO 3166 code: NO-1218

Moster is a former municipality in the old Hordaland county, Norway. The 65.5-square-kilometre (25.3 sq mi) municipality existed from 1916 until its dissolution in 1963. The area is now part of Bømlo Municipality in the traditional district of Sunnhordland in Vestland county. The administrative centre was the village of Mosterhamn, where the Old Moster Church is located (the oldest surviving stone church in Norway).

Prior to its dissolution in 1963, the 65.5-square-kilometre (25.3 sq mi) municipality was the 577th largest by area out of the 705 municipalities in Norway. Moster Municipality was the 471st most populous municipality in Norway with a population of about 1,841. The municipality's population density was 28.1 inhabitants per square kilometre (73/sq mi) and its population had increased by 5.3% over the previous 10-year period.

== General information ==
The municipality of Moster was established on 1 July 1916 when the old Finnaas Municipality was divided into the three new municipalities as follows:

- the southeastern district of Finnaas Municipality (population: 1,316) became the new Moster Municipality
- the southwestern district of Finnaas Municipaltiy (population: 1,217) became the new Bømmel Municipality
- the northern district of Finnaas Municipality (population: 3,411) became the new Bremnes Municipality

During the 1960s, there were many municipal mergers across Norway due to the work of the Schei Committee. On 1 January 1963, a large municipal merger took place and the following areas were merged to form a new, larger Bømlo Municipality:

- all of Moster Municipality (population: 1,834)
- all of Bømlo Municipality (population: 1,463)
- all of Bremnes Municipality (population: 4,829)

=== Name ===
The municipality (originally the parish) is named after the island of Moster (Old Norse: Mostr) since the first Moster Church was built there. The meaning of the first element is uncertain. It may come from the word mosi which means "mossy swamp", likely because the island is marshy. It could also come from the word mostr which means "pleased" or "large amount", possibly referring to the fact that the island is very hilly. Another possibility is that it comes from the word mǫn which means "mane".

=== Churches ===
The Church of Norway had one parish (sokn) within Moster Municipality. At the time of the municipal dissolution, it was part of the Finnås prestegjeld and the Søndre Sunnhordland prosti (deanery) in the Diocese of Bjørgvin.

Churches in Moster Municipality
Parish (sokn)	Church name	Location of the church	Year built
Moster	Moster Church	Mosterhamn	1874
Moster	Old Moster Church	Mosterhamn	c. 1100

== Geography ==
The 65.5-square-kilometre (25.3 sq mi) municipality encompassed the southeastern part of the island of Bømlo and the island of Moster as well as many surrounding islets. The highest point in the municipality was the 473.92-metre (1,554.9 ft) tall mountain Siggjo. Fitjar Municipality is located to the north, Stord Municipality is located to the northeast, Valestrand Municipality is located to the southeast, Sveio Municipality is located to the south, Bømlo Municipality is located to the southwest, and Bremnes Municipality is located to the northwest.

== Government ==
While it existed, Moster Municipality was responsible for primary education (through 10th grade), outpatient health services, senior citizen services, welfare and other social services, zoning, economic development, and municipal roads and utilities. The municipality was governed by a municipal council of directly elected representatives. The mayor was indirectly elected by a vote of the municipal council. The municipality was under the jurisdiction of the Sunnhordland District Court and Gulating Court of Appeal.

=== Municipal council ===
The municipal council (Heradsstyre) of Moster Municipality was made up of 17 representatives that were elected to four year terms. The tables below show the historical composition of the council by political party.

Moster heradsstyre 1959–1963
Party name (in Nynorsk)	Number of representatives
Conservative Party (Høgre)	2
List of workers, fishermen, and small farmholders (Arbeidarar, fiskarar, småbrukarar liste)	2
Local List(s) (Lokale lister)	13
Total number of members:	17
Note: On 1 January 1963, Moster Municipality became part of Bømlo Municipality.

Moster heradsstyre 1955–1959
Party name (in Nynorsk)	Number of representatives
Labour Party (Arbeidarpartiet)	2
Local List(s) (Lokale lister)	15
Total number of members:	17

Moster heradsstyre 1951–1955
Party name (in Nynorsk)	Number of representatives
Local List(s) (Lokale lister)	16
Total number of members:	16

Moster heradsstyre 1947–1951
Party name (in Nynorsk)	Number of representatives
Labour Party (Arbeidarpartiet)	3
List of workers, fishermen, and small farmholders (Arbeidarar, fiskarar, småbrukarar liste)	1
Joint List(s) of Non-Socialist Parties (Borgarlege Felleslister)	2
Local List(s) (Lokale lister)	10
Total number of members:	16

Moster heradsstyre 1945–1947
Party name (in Nynorsk)	Number of representatives
List of workers, fishermen, and small farmholders (Arbeidarar, fiskarar, småbrukarar liste)	4
Local List(s) (Lokale lister)	12
Total number of members:	16

Moster heradsstyre 1937–1941*
Party name (in Nynorsk)	Number of representatives
Labour Party (Arbeidarpartiet)	2
Local List(s) (Lokale lister)	14
Total number of members:	16
Note: Due to the German occupation of Norway during World War II, no elections were held for new municipal councils until after the war ended in 1945.

=== Mayors ===
The mayor (Nynorsk: ordførar) of Moster Municipality was the political leader of the municipality and the chairperson of the municipal council. The following people have held this position:

- 1916–1922: Gerhard Meidell Gerhardsen
- 1923–1925: Lars Larsen Grønaas
- 1925–1930: Gerhard Meidell Gerhardsen
- 1930–1934: Peder J. Skimmeland
- 1935–1947: Lars Larsen Grønaas
- 1947–1959: Aksel Nøkling
- 1959–1963: Harald Gjerde

== See also ==
- List of former municipalities of Norway
