= Kjell Habbestad =

Norwegian contemporary composer (born 1955)

Kjell Habbestad (born 13 April 1955 in Bømlo Municipality) is a Norwegian contemporary composer.

== Career ==
Habbestad studied church music at the Norwegian Academy of Music from 1976 to 1979 and graduated with a diploma from the composition course at the same institution in 1981, having studied with Olav Anton Thommessen, Finn Mortensen and Lasse Thoresen. Habbestad was active as an organist from 1974 to 1987 and, from 2013, is a professor at the Norwegian Academy of Music.

Habbestad’s list of works comprises more than 60 works, including orchestra and chamber works, church music, cantatas, works for organ and piano as well as a number of choir works. His work Mostraspelet – a historic play depicting the Christianization of Norway – has seen annual performances in Bømlo since 1983. As a composer, Habbestad debuted with a first prize for his choir work Magnificat in TONO’s 1978 composition competition.

Habbestad’s most central works to date includes the oratory Ei natt på jorda and the operas Hans Egedes natt as well as The Maid of Norway, both featuring librettos by Paal-Helge Haugen. Other key works include the string quartet Quattro Stazioni, the major piano work Hammerklavie'r, Munchsuite – concerto for flute and strings, Ave Maria – concerto for organ and strings, Etwas Neues unter der Sonnen – concerto for Hardanger Fiddle and symphonic band, Un rêve Norvégien – concerto for saxophone and symphonic band, the organ work Introduction & Passacaglia – based on two themes by Fartein Valen and 14 Ibsensanger for baritone and piano.

Additional key elements of Habbestad’s compositional output comprise vocal music, choir works, cantatas and chamber music. Examples of this focus include oratories and liturgical dramas such as Ubal, Jabal, Kar og kjerring, Noahs draum, and Angeli, 18 englebilder. Major choir works in Habbestad’s list of works includes 3 Cantica (Magnificat, Nunc Dimittis and Benedictus Dominus) , Nox Praecessit, Stabat Mater dolorosa for male vocal quartet and men’s choir, Ego Clamavi, Apal, Kverni and Sju vindar.

Habbestad served as a member of the board for the Norwegian Society of Composers from 1987 to 1996, as deputy director for the organization from 1990 to 1996 and as leader of NSC’s advisory committee from 1996 to 2002.

== Production ==
=== Selected works ===
- Eg trur (2017)
- Nenia — ein kammeropera til minne om Fartein Valen (2014)
- Strykekvartett nr. 2 (2013)
- Greven av Monte Cristo (2011)
- Konsert for obo og orkester (2012),
- Adam og Eva (2008)
- Une Page d’Historie de la Civilisation (2005)
- Munchsuite (2002)
- Un rêve Norvégien, konsert for altsaksofon og symphonic band (2002)
- Angeli for fløyte, fiolin, cello og piano (2001)
- The Maid of Norway (2000)
- 14 Ibsensanger (1996)
- Hans Egedes natt (1995)
- Ei natt på jorda (1993)
- Quattro Stazioni (1989)
- Hammerklavier (1989)
- Etwas Neues unter der Sonnen, konsert for hardingfele og symphonic band (1986)
- Ave Maria (1984)

=== Discography ===
- Gaudeamus (2012)
- Det Norske Solistkor, Nocturnus (2003)
- The Habbestad Ensemble, Angeli / Kjell Habbestad (2003)
- The Habbestad Ensemble, Uppskoka - the New Brew (2001)
- Erlend Tunestveit, Kolbotn Ungdomskorps, Etwas Neues unter der Sonnen (2002)
- Con Spirito, Helge Birkeland, Den fagraste Rosa - toner for advent og jul (2001)
- Noahs draum (1998)
- Con Spirito, Helge Birkeland, Toner fra Norden (1998)
- The Habbestad Ensemble, Echoes of Norway (1998)
- Mostraspelet (1995)
- Ei natt på jorda: eit oratorium (1995)
