= Sunnhordland Arbeiderblad =

Norwegian newspaper

Sunnhordland Arbeiderblad was a Norwegian newspaper, published in Stord Municipality in Vestland county.

Sunnhordland Arbeiderblad was started in 1946 as the Communist Party of Norway organ in Sunnhordland. It had a predecessor in Sunnhordlands Kommunistblad, which existed from 1927 to 1928. Sunnhordland Arbeiderblad went defunct already in 1947. It resurfaced from 1951 to 1955.
