= Sunnhordlands Kommunistblad =

Norwegian newspaper

Sunnhordlands Kommunistblad was a Norwegian newspaper, published in Stord Municipality in Vestland county.

== History and profile ==
Sunnhordlands Kommunistblad was started on 6 January 1927 as the Communist Party organ in the region Sunnhordland. It was published weekly. However, the party struggled economically and the newspaper went defunct after its last issue on 5 July 1928.

After the Second World War, a short-lived Sunnhordland Arbeiderblad existed.
