= Haldor Andreas Haldorsen =

Norwegian politician

Haldor Andreas Haldorsen (21 February 1883 – 23 April 1965) was a Norwegian politician for the Liberal Party.

He was born in Finnaas Municipality. He was elected to the Norwegian Parliament from Hordaland in 1945, and was re-elected on one occasion. He had previously served in the position of deputy representative during the terms 1928–1930, 1931–1933 and 1934–1936.

Haldorsen was a member of the executive committee of the municipal council of Bremnes Municipality from 1916 to 1942.
