= Langevåg, Vestland =

Village in Bømlo Municipality, Norway

Langevåg
- Village
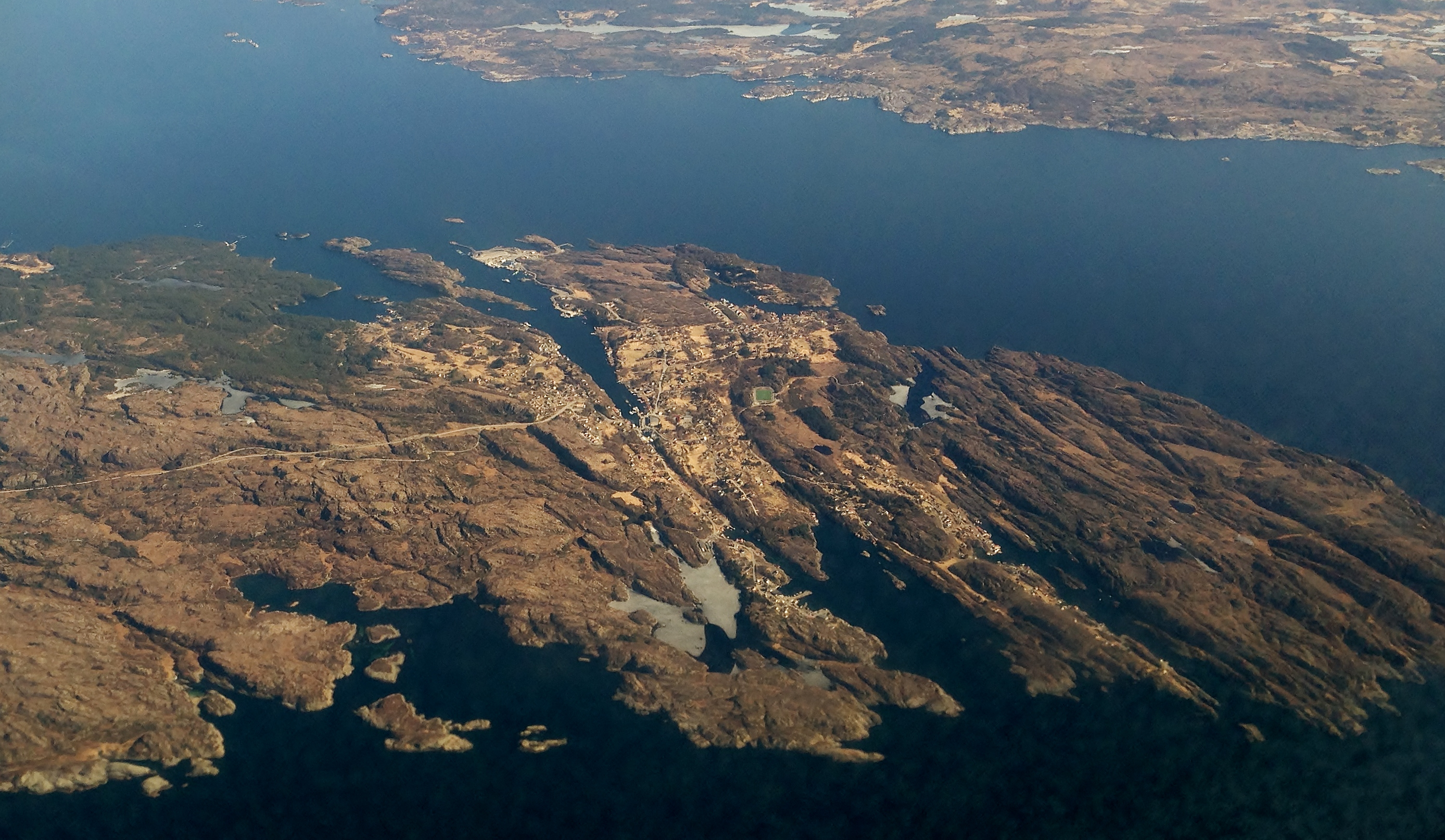
- Interactive map of Langevåg
- Coordinates: 59.60215°N 5.20818°E
- Country: Norway
- Region: Western Norway
- County: Vestland
- District: Sunnhordland
- Municipality: Bømlo Municipality

Area
  - Total: 1.24 km^{2} (0.48 sq mi)
- Elevation: 3 m (9.8 ft)

Population (2025)
  - Total: 754
  - Density: 608/km^{2} (1,570/sq mi)
- Time zone: UTC+01:00 (CET)
  - Summer (DST): UTC+02:00 (CEST)
- Post Code: 5443 Bømlo

Langevåg is a village in Bømlo Municipality in Vestland county, Norway. It is located on the southern tip of the island of Bømlo, along the Bømlafjorden. It lies in the far southern part of the municipality, about 12 kilometres (7.5 mi) south of the village of Lykling. The 1.24-square-kilometre (310-acre) village has a population (2025) of 754 and a population density of 608 inhabitants per square kilometre (1,570/sq mi). This makes it the fourth largest village in the municipality.

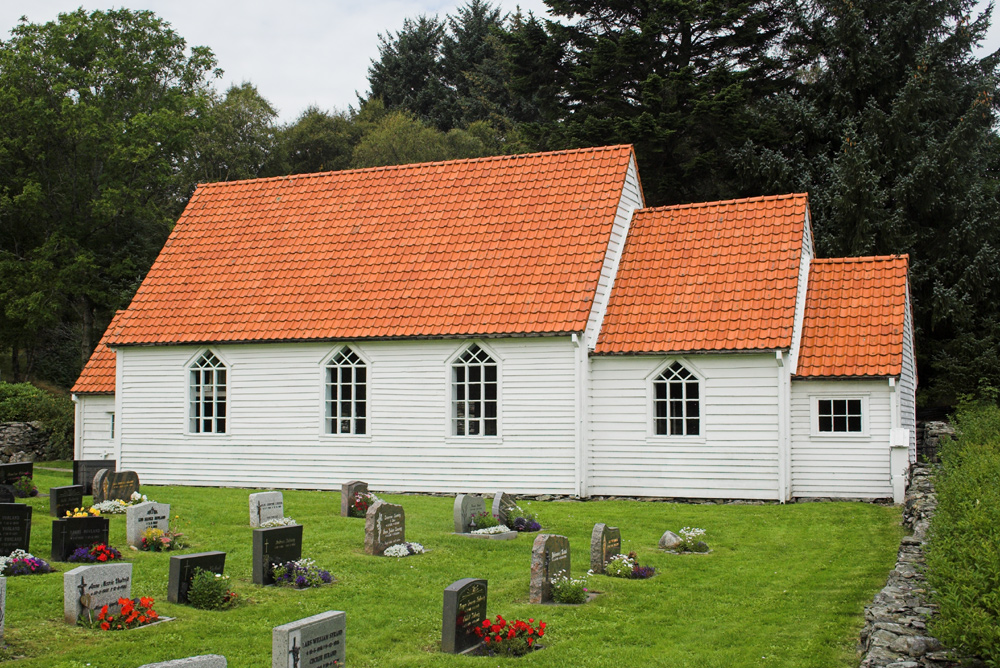
View of the Old Bømlo Church

Norwegian County Road 541 goes through the village and ends at a ferry port that has a regular connection to the village of Buavåg in Sveio Municipality across the fjord. The village is a historic church site with the Old Bømlo Church (from the 1600s) and the new Bømlo Church (from 1960) both being located here.
