= Gerhard Meidell Gerhardsen (1848–1912) =

Norwegian politician

Gerhard Meidell Gerhardsen (9 July 1848 – 25 July 1912) was a Norwegian bailiff and politician for the Conservative Party.

He was born at the farm Roalstvedt in Quindherred Municipality as a son of Clement Gerhardsen and Mette Dorthea Haavig. He worked as acting bailiff in Føyen from 1871 to 1872, and bailiff in Finnaas Municipality from 1872. From 1874 he was a member of the municipal council for Finnaas Municipality. He was also chairman of the savings bank Moster Sparebank, and worked as a farmer and school teacher.

He was elected to the Parliament of Norway in 1892. He was later re-elected in 1895, 1904, 1907 and 1910, representing the constituencies of Søndre Bergenhus Amt (first three terms) and Ytre Søndhordland (last two terms). He represented the Conservative Party, except for the fourth term when he represented the Coalition Party.

His son Gerhard Meidell Gerhardsen became a farmer, bailiff and politician too, and his grandson Gerhard Meidell Gerhardsen became a notable economist.
