= Bømlo Church =

Church in Vestland, Norway

- Bømlo kyrkje
- Bømlo Church
- 59°36′16″N 5°12′39″E
- Location: Bømlo Municipality, Vestland
- Country: Norway
- Denomination: Church of Norway
- Churchmanship: Evangelical Lutheran

History
- Status: Parish church
- Founded: 1960
- Consecrated: 10 April 1960

Architecture
- Functional status: Active
- Architect(s): Ole Halvorsen and Arne Halvorsen
- Architectural type: Long church
- Completed: 1960 (66 years ago)

Specifications
- Capacity: 500
- Materials: Concrete

Administration
- Diocese: Bjørgvin bispedømme
- Deanery: Sunnhordland prosti
- Parish: Bømlo

Bømlo Church (Norwegian: Bømlo kyrkje) is a parish church of the Church of Norway in Bømlo Municipality in Vestland county, Norway. It is located in the village of Langevåg on the southern tip of the island of Bømlo. It is the main church for the Bømlo parish which is part of the Sunnhordland prosti (deanery) in the Diocese of Bjørgvin. The white concrete church was built in a long church design in 1960 using plans drawn up by the architects Ole Halvorsen and Arne Halvorsen. The church seats about 500 people.

== History ==
The Old Bømlo Church served the area for centuries and eventually it was deemed to be too small for the parish. In 1960, a new Bømlo Church was constructed about 500 metres (0.31 mi) to the southwest of the old church site. The new church has a rectangular nave with a somewhat narrower chancel to the south. The northern part of the nave contains an entrance hall with cloakroom, toilets, and stairs to the organ gallery on the second floor. On the west side of the choir is a priest's sacristy and on the east side of the choir is a church hall. The new church was consecrated on 10 April 1960 and it has since been the main church for the parish and the Old Bømlo Church is now only used for special occasions.

== See also ==
- List of churches in Bjørgvin
