= Slåtterøy Lighthouse =

Coastal lighthouse in Bømlo, Norway

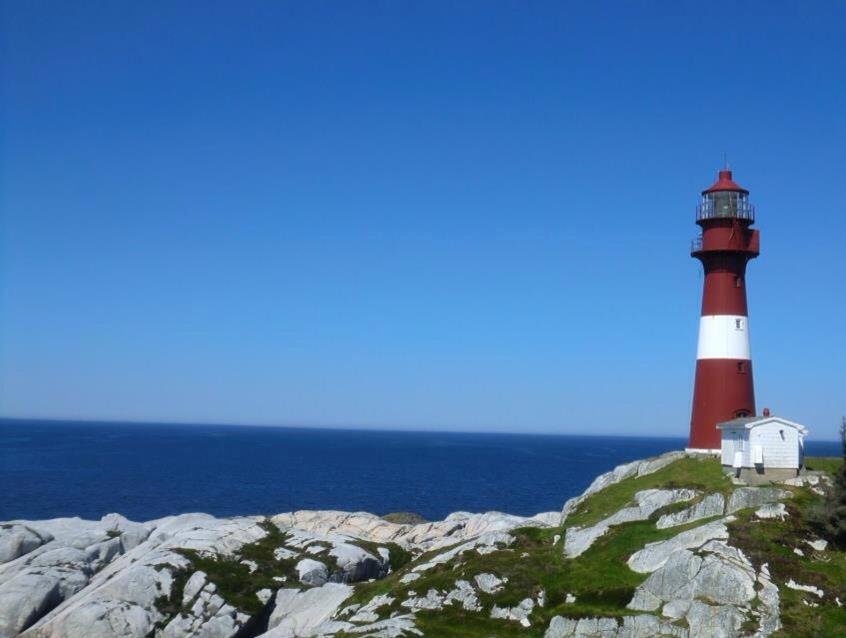
- View of the lighthouse
- Location: Bømlo Municipality; Vestland, Norway
- Coordinates: 59°54′29″N 5°04′02″E

Tower
- Constructed: 1859
- Construction: cast iron
- Automated: 2003
- Height: 25 m (82 ft)
- Shape: cylindrical tower with double balcony and lantern
- Markings: red tower with an horizontal white band, red lantern
- Operator: Bømlo Kommune
- Heritage: cultural property
- Racon: T

Light
- Focal height: 45.8 m (150 ft)
- Intensity: 5,180,000 cd
- Range: 18.5 nmi (34.3 km; 21.3 mi)
- Characteristic: Fl(2) W 30s

Slåtterøy Lighthouse (Norwegian: Slåtterøy fyr) is a coastal lighthouse located in Bømlo Municipality in southwestern Vestland county, Norway. It sits at the western entrance to the Selbjørnsfjorden, marking an island-filled area northeast of Bømlo and northwest of Stord.

== History ==
The lighthouse was established in 1859 and fully automated in 2003. The 25-metre (82 ft) round, cast iron tower is painted red with one white horizontal band. At the top, there is a light that emits a 5,180,000 candela, the highest intensity among all lighthouses in Norway. The light sits at an elevation of 45.8 metres (150 ft) above sea level and it emits a white light in the pattern of 2 flashes every 30 seconds.

The lighthouse was listed as a protected site in 2000 and in 2003 it was fully automated. The ownership of the site was then transferred to the municipal government. Overnight accommodations are available, as are guided tours. The site is only accessible by boat from the nearby island of Gisøy.

== Climate ==
Climate data for Slåtterøy Lighthouse 1991-2020 (25 m, extremes 1954-2020)
| Month | Jan | Feb | Mar | Apr | May | Jun | Jul | Aug | Sep | Oct | Nov | Dec | Year |
|---|---|---|---|---|---|---|---|---|---|---|---|---|---|
| Record high °C (°F) | 12.5 (54.5) | 11.2 (52.2) | 15.1 (59.2) | 22.9 (73.2) | 26.4 (79.5) | 28 (82) | 30.9 (87.6) | 29.6 (85.3) | 25.7 (78.3) | 21.4 (70.5) | 16.7 (62.1) | 12.6 (54.7) | 30.9 (87.6) |
| Mean daily maximum °C (°F) | 5.2 (41.4) | 4.6 (40.3) | 5.6 (42.1) | 8.5 (47.3) | 11.4 (52.5) | 14.1 (57.4) | 16.4 (61.5) | 17.3 (63.1) | 15 (59) | 11.5 (52.7) | 8.2 (46.8) | 6.2 (43.2) | 10.3 (50.6) |
| Daily mean °C (°F) | 3.7 (38.7) | 3 (37) | 3.9 (39.0) | 6.4 (43.5) | 9.2 (48.6) | 12.1 (53.8) | 14.5 (58.1) | 15.3 (59.5) | 13.2 (55.8) | 9.8 (49.6) | 6.7 (44.1) | 4.6 (40.3) | 8.5 (47.3) |
| Mean daily minimum °C (°F) | 2 (36) | 1.4 (34.5) | 2.3 (36.1) | 4.5 (40.1) | 7.5 (45.5) | 10.5 (50.9) | 12.9 (55.2) | 13.6 (56.5) | 11.6 (52.9) | 8.2 (46.8) | 5 (41) | 3 (37) | 6.9 (44.4) |
| Record low °C (°F) | −12.6 (9.3) | −10 (14) | −8.3 (17.1) | −3.6 (25.5) | −3.1 (26.4) | 3.6 (38.5) | 7 (45) | 8 (46) | 4.4 (39.9) | 0.3 (32.5) | −5.7 (21.7) | −10.2 (13.6) | −12.6 (9.3) |
| Average precipitation mm (inches) | 135 (5.3) | 113 (4.4) | 100 (3.9) | 87 (3.4) | 68 (2.7) | 74 (2.9) | 86 (3.4) | 119 (4.7) | 139 (5.5) | 161 (6.3) | 163 (6.4) | 149 (5.9) | 1,394 (54.8) |
Source 1: eklima/Norwegian Meteorological Institute
Source 2: NOAA-WMO averages 91-2020 Norway

== See also ==
- Lighthouses in Norway
- List of lighthouses in Norway
