= Lykling =

Village in Bømlo Municipality, Norway

- Village
- Interactive map of Lykling
- Coordinates: 59.70201°N 5.18249°E
- Country: Norway
- Region: Western Norway
- County: Vestland
- District: Sunnhordland
- Municipality: Bømlo Municipality
- Elevation: 3 m (9.8 ft)
- Time zone: UTC+01:00 (CET)
  - Summer (DST): UTC+02:00 (CEST)
- Post Code: 5437 Finnås

Lykling (historically: Løkling) is a village in Bømlo Municipality in Vestland county, Norway. The village is located on the southwestern part of the island of Bømlo. The village is about 12 kilometres (7.5 mi) north of the village of Langevåg and it sits at the end of the Lyklingfjorden, a small bay off the North Sea to the west.

Lykling has become a popular tourist attraction, mainly due to its history of extensive gold mining in Lyklingeberga, the mountainous area surrounding the village. The discovery of gold in 1862 by a young shepherd, led to several constructions being built in the area. These were built by three major companies, mainly financed and run by English businessmen.

In addition to the mining constructions, two hotels, one hotel ship, several bakeries, Lykling Church, and a number of retail stores were built in the village. At its peak, about 500 men were working in these mines. Mining activity started in 1882 and ended in 1910, lasting more than 25 years and removing over 250 kilograms (550 lb) of pure gold during that time.
