= Bjarne Kristiansen =

Norwegian politician (born 1937)

- Born: 25 October 1937 (age 88); Bømlo Municipality, Norway
- Occupation: Politician
- Political party: Labour Party

Bjarne Kristiansen (born 25 October 1937) is a Norwegian politician.

== Biography ==
Kristensen was born in Bømlo Municipality on 25 October 1937 to Hans Kristiansen and Johanna B. Hillesøy. He was elected representative to the Storting from Hordaland for the period 1985–1989 for the Labour Party.
