= Odd Harald Hovland =

Norwegian politician

- Born: 29 September 1962 (age 63)
- Education: Norwegian Police University College
- Occupations: Police officer Politician
- Political party: Labour Party

Odd Harald Hovland (born 29 September 1962) is a Norwegian politician. He has been a member of the Storting since 2021.

== Personal life and education ==
Born on 29 September 1962, Hovland is a son of nurse Elisabeth Nordstrand and Leif Hovland. He graduated from the Norwegian Police University College in 2007.

== Political career ==
=== Local politics ===
A member of the municipal council of Bømlo Municipality from 2007 to 2019, Hovland served as mayor of Bømlo from 2011 to 2019.

=== Parliament ===
He was elected representative to the Storting from the constituency of Hordaland for the period 2021–2025, for the Labour Party.

In the Storting, he is a member of the Standing Committee on Justice from 2021 to 2025.
