= Gerhard Meidell Gerhardsen (1885–1931) =

Norwegian politician

Gerhard Meidell Gerhardsen (25 April 1885 – 28 July 1931) was a Norwegian bailiff and politician for the Conservative Party and Centre Party.

He was born at the farm Teigland in Finnaas Municipality as a son of bailiff, farmer and politician Gerhard Meidell Gerhardsen (1848–1912) and Anna Trovik (1848–1933). He took education at middle school and agricultural school, and started the career in his father's bailiff office. He became acting bailiff in 1912 when his father died, and also took over the family farm. He remained here until 1930, when he moved to become bailiff of Etne Municipality. He was also the treasurer of the local savings bank Moster Sparebank from 1904 to 1929.

From 1913 to 1916 he was a member of the municipal council of Finnaas Municipality, and from 1916 to 1922 and 1925 to 1931 he was the mayor of Moster Municipality. He served as a deputy representative to the Parliament of Norway in the terms 1919–1921 and 1931–1933, representing two different parties: the Conservative and Centre parties.

His son Gerhard Meidell Gerhardsen, whom he had together with Helga Marie Selmer (1888–1935), became a notable economist.
