= Old Bømlo Church =

Church in Vestland, Norway

- Bømlo gamle kyrkje
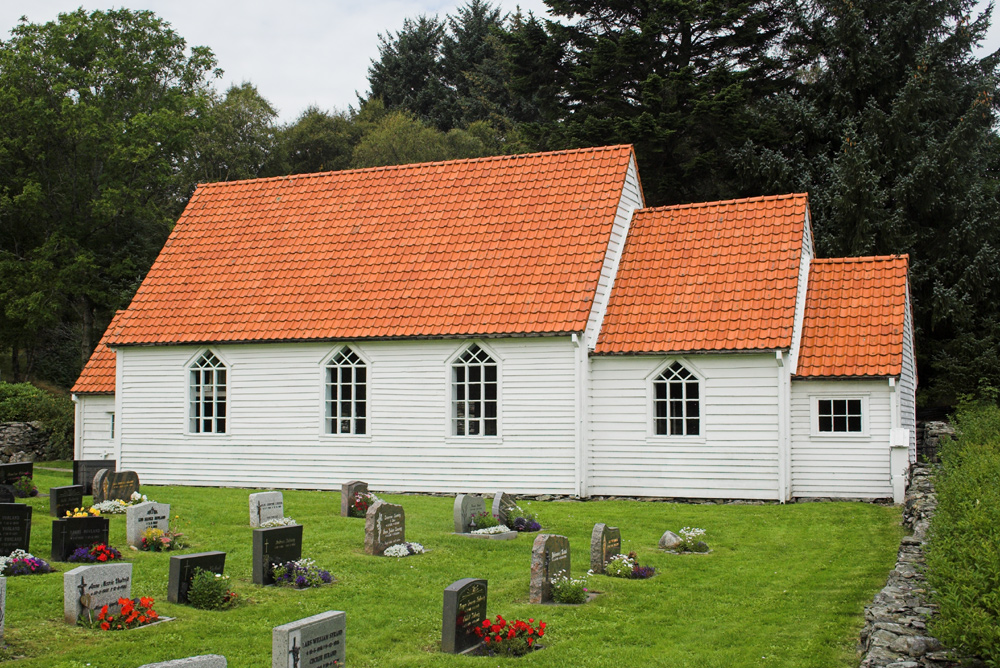
- View of the church
- Old Bømlo Church
- 59°36′32″N 5°12′50″E
- Location: Bømlo Municipality, Vestland
- Country: Norway
- Denomination: Church of Norway
- Previous denomination: Catholic Church
- Churchmanship: Evangelical Lutheran

History
- Status: Parish church
- Founded: 13th century
- Consecrated: 1621

Architecture
- Functional status: Active
- Architectural type: Long church
- Completed: 1621 (405 years ago)
- Closed: 1960

Specifications
- Capacity: 150
- Materials: Wood

Administration
- Diocese: Bjørgvin bispedømme
- Deanery: Sunnhordland prosti
- Parish: Bømlo
- Norwegian Cultural Heritage Site
- Type: Church
- Status: Automatically protected
- ID: 83998

Old Bømlo Church or Old Vorland Church (Norwegian: Bømlo gamle kyrkje or Vorland gamle kyrkje) is a parish church of the Church of Norway in Bømlo Municipality in Vestland county, Norway. It is located in Vorland, just northeast of the village of Langevåg on the southern tip of the island of Bømlo. It was once the main church for the Bømlo parish which is part of the Sunnhordland prosti (deanery) in the Diocese of Bjørgvin. The white, wooden church was built in a long church design in 1621 using plans drawn up by an unknown architect. The church seats about 150 people.

== History ==
The first church in the Langevåg area was probably a small wooden stave church that may have been built during the 13th century. This church was located a Voll, about 700 metres (2,300 ft) west of the present day "Old Bømlo Church". The earliest existing historical records of the church date back to the mid-1300s where the church is referred to in the index of a book, but the page it was discussed on is missing. In the early 1600s, it was decided to move the church site closer to the village, so a new site at the Vorland farm was chosen (which is why it's sometimes called Vorland Church). In 1620, the old medieval church was torn down and replaced with a new church on the new site in 1621. The new building was a wooden long church with a rectangular nave and narrower chancel to the east and a church porch to the west. The church was rebuilt in 1885, with larger windows, new doors, and new second floor seating galleries. The ceiling was also rebuilt at the same time. A small sacristy on the east side of the choir was built in 1951. By the mid-20th century, the church had become too small for the congregation and so it was decided to build a new church for the parish and close the old church. In 1960, a new, modern Bømlo Church was built about 500 metres (1,600 ft) to the southwest, closer to the main village centre of Langevåg. After the new church was completed, the old church was taken out of regular use, and it is now mostly for special events such as weddings and special services.

== See also ==
- List of churches in Bjørgvin
