= Bremnes IL =

Norwegian sports club

- Full name: Bremnes Idrettslag
- Founded: 1945
- Ground: Sentralidrettsanlegget, Bremnes
- League: 4. divisjon
- 2023: 3. divisjon group 3, 14th of 14 (relegated)
Home colours	Away colours

Bremnes Idrettslag is a Norwegian sports club from Bremnes in Bømlo Municipality, Vestland county, Norway. It has sections for association football, team handball, basketball, track and field and gymnastics.

The club was founded in 1945.

The men's football team plays in the Fourth Division, the fifth tier of Norwegian football. It played in the Third Division from 1993 to 1994, 1996 to 2005, in the year 2007 and from 2022 to 2023. Notable players including Arne Larsen Økland, Geirmund Brendesæter, Martin Hollund, Wazoodi Jr and Joakim Våge Nilsen started their careers here.

== Extremal links ==
- Official site (in Norwegian)
