= MV Clio =

1940 cargo ship

History
- Name: Bukarest (1939–45); Empire Ettrick (1945–46); Bremnes (1946–47); Clio (1947–63); Panorea (1963–72); Charity (1972–74)
- Owner: Deutsche Levant Line (1939–45); Ministry of War Transport (1945); Ministry of Transport (1945–46); Norwegian Government (1946); Bergen Steamship Co (1946–63); Compania Panorea SA (1963–69); Panorea Compania Naviera SA (1969–72); United Shipowners Ltd (1972)
- Operator: Luftwaffe (1940–45); Cunard Steamship Co Ltd (1945–46); Nortraship (1946-47); Bergen Steamship Co (1947–63); M A Karageorgis (1963–69); E T Kolintzas & Maltakis (1969-72)
- Port of registry: Hamburg, Germany (1939–45); United Kingdom (1945–46); Oslo, Norway (1946); (Norway) Bergen (1946–63); Piraeus, Greece (1963–72); Famagusta, Cyprus (1972)
- Builder: Deutsche Werft
- Yard number: 226
- Launched: 1939
- Completed: June 1940
- Identification: United Kingdom Official Number 180678 (1945–46); Code Letters GNLR (1945–46); Code Letters LLTN (1946–63); IMO number: 5076078 ( –1974)
- Fate: Scrapped

General characteristics
- Type: Cargo ship
- Tonnage: 4,558 GRT; 2,661 NRT; 6,988 DWT
- Length: 401 ft 9 in (122.45 m)
- Beam: 55 ft 7 in (16.94 m)
- Depth: 21 ft 3 in (6.48 m)
- Installed power: 885 nhp
- Propulsion: 2 x 2SCSA diesel engines
- Speed: 14 knots (26 km/h)
- Capacity: 409,004 cubic feet (11,581.7 m^{3}) cargo space

Clio was a 4,558 GRT cargo ship that was built in 1939 as Bukarest by Deutsche Werft, Hamburg, Germany for Deutsche Levant Line. She was seized by Allied forces in 1945, passed to the Ministry of War Transport (MoWT) and renamed Empire Ettrick. She was passed to the Norwegian Government in 1940s and renamed Bremnes. In 1947, she was sold to a Norwegian company and renamed Clio. A sale to a Greek company in 1963 saw her renamed Panorea. She served until 1972, when she was renamed Charity and sold for scrapping, which occurred in 1974.

== Description ==
The ship was built in 1939 by Deutsche Werft, Hamburg. She was yard number 226. She had 409,004 cubic feet (11,581.7 m^{3}) cargo space.

The ship was 409 feet 9 inches (124.89 m) long, with a beam of 55 feet 7 inches (16.94 m). She had a depth of 21 feet 3 inches (6.48 m). She was assessed at 4,558 GRT, 2,661 NRT, 6,988 DWT.

The ship was propelled by two two-stroke Single Cycle, Single Action diesel engines, which had six cylinders of 20 1/2 inches (52 cm) diameter by 27 9/16 inches (70.0 cm) stroke driving twin screw propellers. The engines were built by Maschinenfabrik Augsburg-Nürnberg, Augsburg. They were rated at 885 nhp, 3,860 bhp. They could propel her at 14 knots (26 km/h).

== History ==
Bukarest was launched in 1939. Delivered in June, 1940, she was used by the Luftwaffe during World War II as an aircraft maintenance ship. In May 1945, she was seized at Kiel, Germany, as a war prize. She was passed to the MoWT and renamed Empire Ettrick. She was placed under the management of the Cunard Steamship Co Ltd. Her port of registry was London. The United Kingdom Official Number 180678 and Code Letters GNLR were allocated. In July 1946, she was transferred to the Norwegian Government and renamed Bremnes. The Code Letters LLTN were allocated.

In December 1946, Bremnes was sold to the Bergen Steamship Co, Bergen. She was renamed Clio in March 1947. On 28 March, she collided with the Norwegian cargo ship Sevilla west of Bloksen. Sevilla sank with the loss of ten crew. In 1953, there was a fire on board. In August 1963, Clio was sold to Compania Panorea SA, Piraeus, Greece and was renamed Panorea. She was operated under the management of M A Karageorgis. Her owners became Panorea Compania Naviera SA in 1969. Management was transferred to E T Kolintzas & Maltakis following this change. With the introduction of IMO Numbers in the late 1960s, Panorea was allocated IMO 5076078. In September 1972, Panorea was sold to United Shipowners Ltd, Famagusta, Cyprus and renamed Charity. She arrived on 22 September at Kaohsiung, Taiwan for scrapping. She was scrapped in 1974.
