= Selbjørnsfjorden =

Fjord in Vestland, Norway

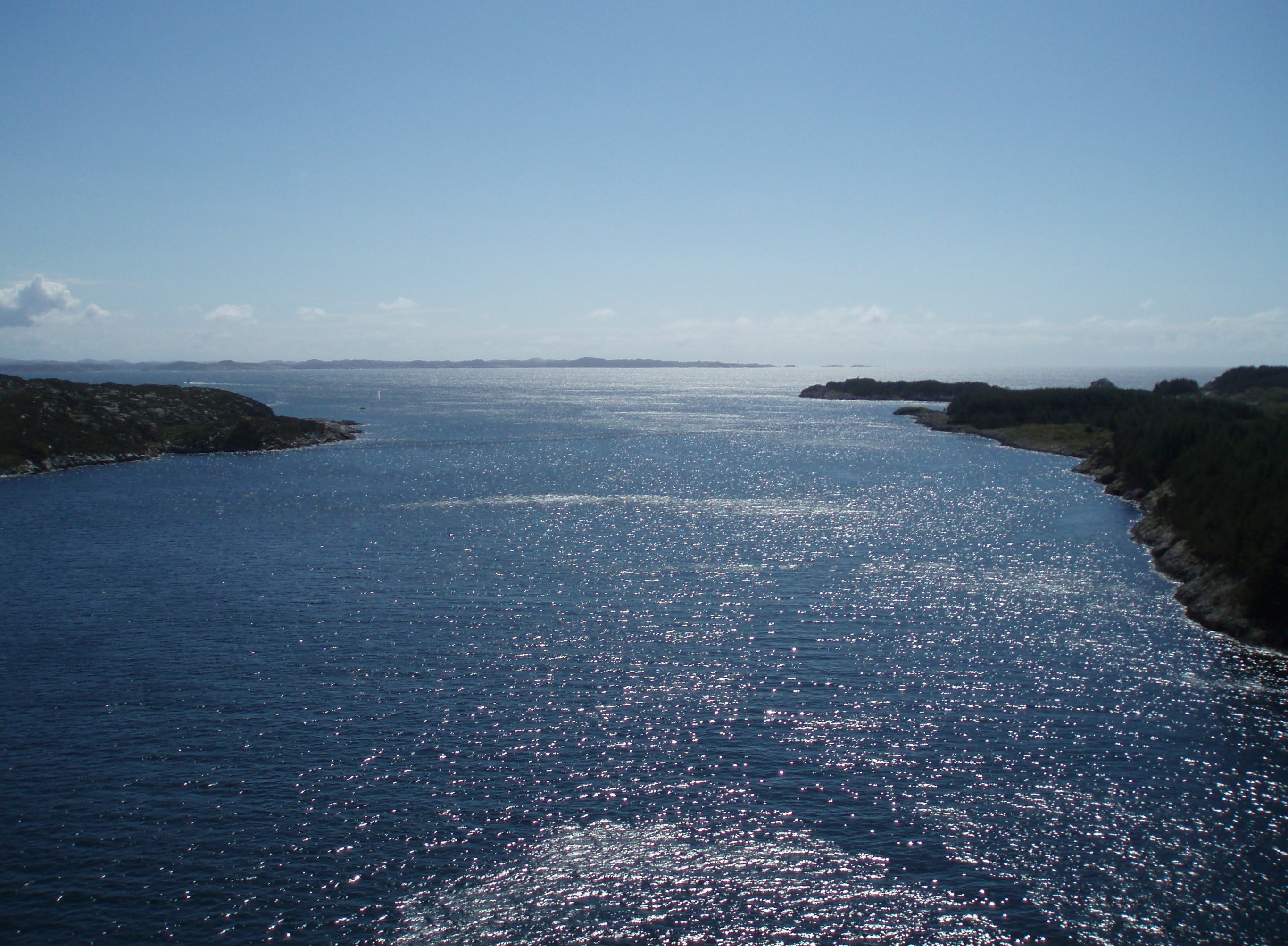
- View of Stolmasundet strait with the fjord in the background.
- Interactive map of Selbjørnsfjorden
- Location: Vestland county, Norway
- Coordinates: 59.9375°N 5.08748°E
- Type: Fjord
- Primary inflows: Langenuen
- Primary outflows: North Sea
- Basin countries: Norway
- Max. length: 20 kilometres (12 mi)
- Max. width: 8 kilometres (5.0 mi)
- Islands: Selbjørn, Stolmen, Stord

Selbjørnsfjorden is a fjord in Vestland county, Norway. The 20-kilometre (12 mi) long fjord flows east–west between Austevoll Municipality, Fitjar Municipality, and Bømlo Municipality. It is a wide fjord that starts at the Slåtterøy Lighthouse at the North Sea in the west and flows to the Langenuen strait in the east. The central part of the fjord reaches about 8 kilometres (5.0 mi) wide. The fjord is named after the nearby island of Selbjørn.

== See also ==
- List of Norwegian fjords
