= Bømlo Municipality =

Municipality in Vestland, Norway

Bømlo Municipality Bømlo kommune
- Municipality
- Bømmel herred (historic name)
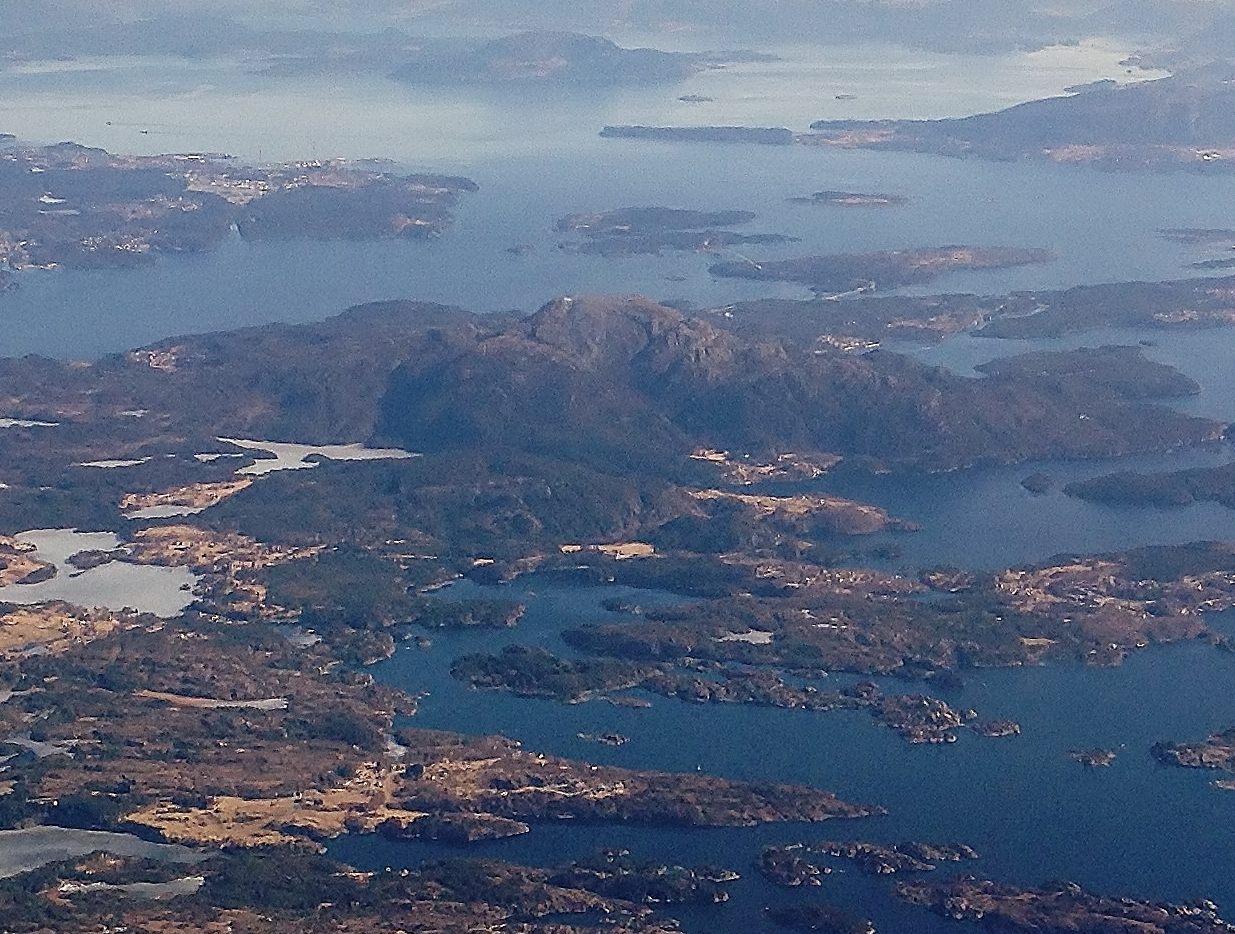
- View of southern Bømlo

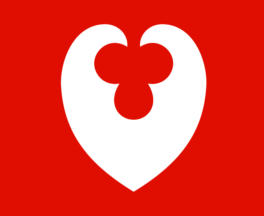
- Flag Coat of arms

- Vestland within Norway

- Bømlo within Vestland
- Coordinates: 59°46′46″N 05°13′06″E
- Country: Norway
- County: Vestland
- District: Sunnhordland
- Established: 1 January 1916
  - Preceded by: Finnaas Municipality
- Administrative centre: Svortland

Government
  - Mayor (2026): Arne Tamoodi Helland (RWP)

Area
  - Total: 246.57 km^{2} (95.20 sq mi)
  - Land: 235.51 km^{2} (90.93 sq mi)
  - Water: 11.06 km^{2} (4.27 sq mi) 4.5%
  - Rank: #290 in Norway
- Highest elevation: 473.92 m (1,554.9 ft)

Population (2025)
  - Total: 12,673
  - Rank: #97 in Norway
  - Density: 50.1/km^{2} (130/sq mi)
  - Change (10 years): ▲ +4.4%
- Demonym: Bømling

Official language
  - Norwegian form: Nynorsk
- Time zone: UTC+01:00 (CET)
  - Summer (DST): UTC+02:00 (CEST)
- ISO 3166 code: NO-4613
- Website: Official website

Bømlo (/ˈbʌmˌloʊ/) is a municipality in the southwestern part of Vestland county, Norway. It is located in the traditional district of Sunnhordland. The administrative centre of the municipality is the village of Svortland. Other villages in Bømlo include Mosterhamn, Rubbestadneset, Lykling, and Langevåg. Most of the municipal residents live on the island of Bømlo, which makes up the majority of the land in the municipality.

The 246.57-square-kilometre (95.20 sq mi) municipality is the 290th largest by area out of the 357 municipalities in Norway. Bømlo Municipality is the 97th most populous municipality in Norway with a population of 12,365. The municipality's population density is 50.1 inhabitants per square kilometre (130/sq mi) and its population has increased by 4.4% over the previous 10-year period.

Bømlo was actively involved in the Shetland bus operation during the Second World War. A 23-year-old male from Bømlo, Nils Nesse, was the first of the Shetland Bus men to be killed.

== General information ==
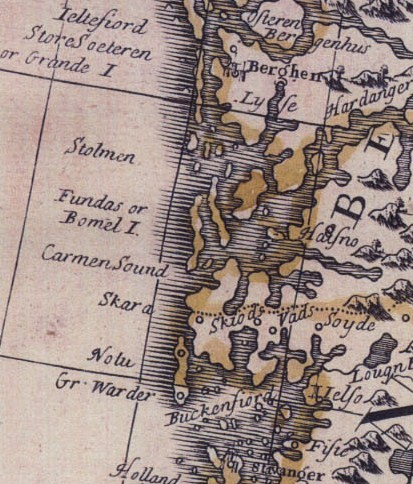
A 1720 map showing "Fundas or Bomel I."

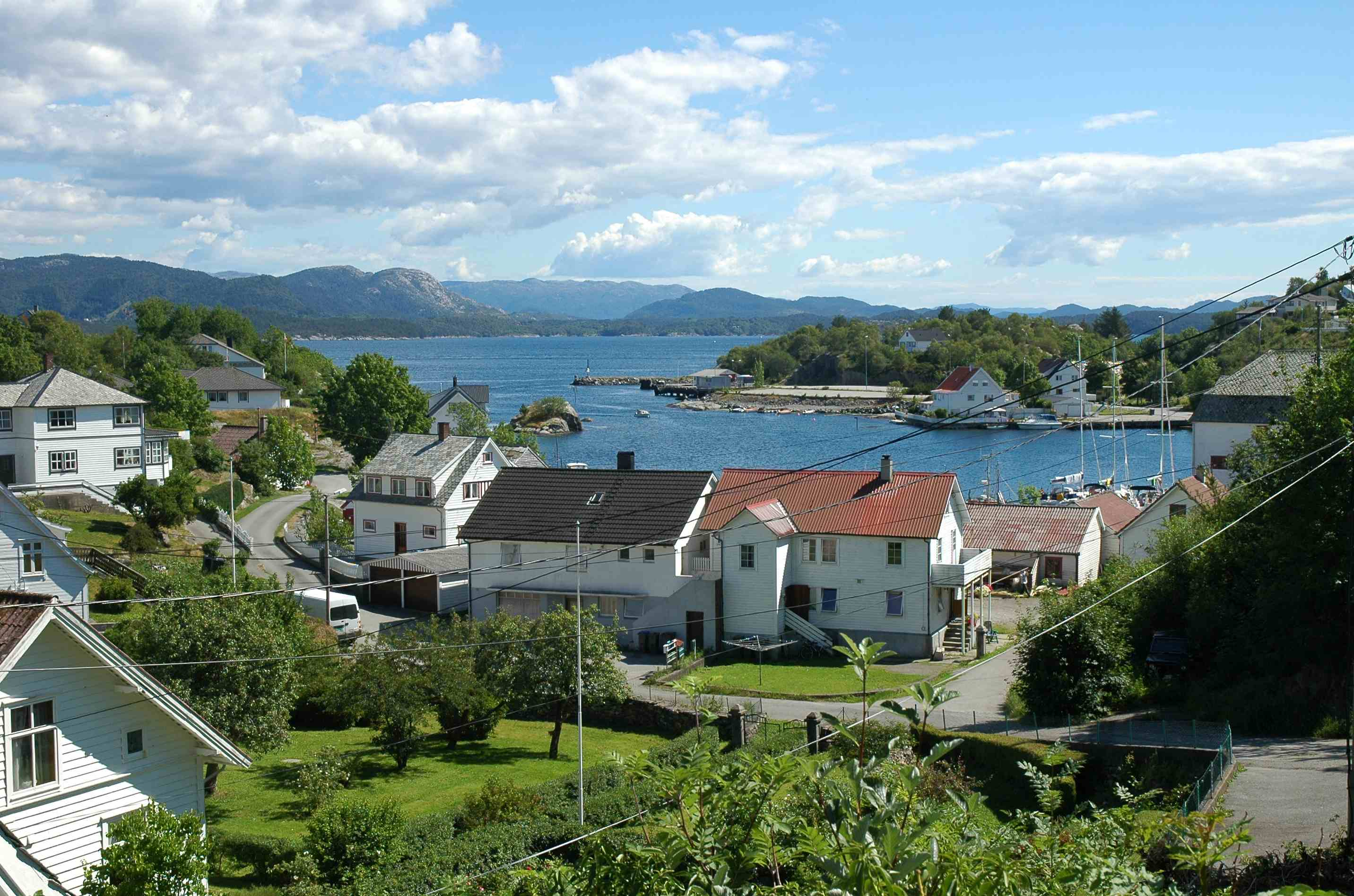
View of Mosterhamn

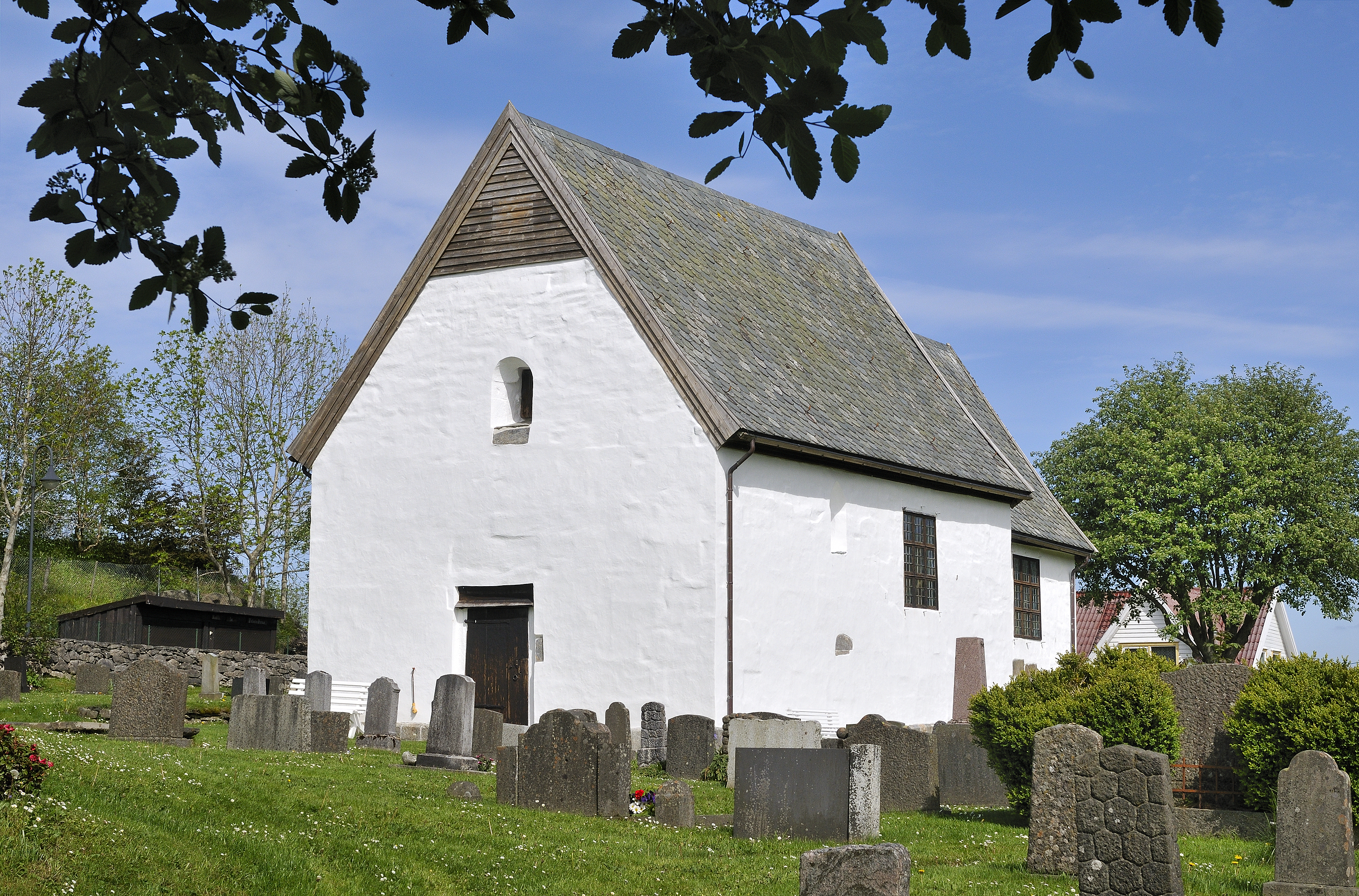
View of the Old Moster Church

The municipality of Bømmel (later spelled Bømlo) was established on 1 July 1916 when the old Finnaas Municipality was divided into the three new municipalities as follows:

- the southwestern district of Finnaas Municipaltiy (population: 1,217) became the new Bømmel Municipality
- the southeastern district of Finnaas Municipality (population: 1,316) became the new Moster Municipality
- the northern district of Finnaas Municipality (population: 3,411) became the new Bremnes Municipality

On 3 November 1917, the name was changed to Bømlo Municipality.

During the 1960s, there were many municipal mergers across Norway due to the work of the Schei Committee. On 1 January 1963, a large municipal merger took place and the following areas were merged to form a new, larger Bømlo Municipality:

- all of Bømlo Municipality (population: 1,463)
- all of Moster Municipality (population: 1,834)
- all of Bremnes Municipality (population: 4,829)

On 1 January 1970, a small area along the Valvatnavågen bay on the island of Stord was transferred from Bømlo Municipality to the neighboring Stord Municipality. On 1 January 1995, the islands of Aga, Agasystra, Gisøya, Vikøya, Selsøy, Risøya, and many smaller surrounding islands (population: 225) were transferred from the neighboring Fitjar Municipality to Bømlo Municipality. These islands had recently been connected to Bømlo Municipality by road bridges which precipitated the municipal transfer.

Historically, this municipality was part of the old Hordaland county. On 1 January 2020, the municipality became a part of the newly-formed Vestland county (after Hordaland and Sogn og Fjordane counties were merged).

=== Name ===
The municipality is named after the main island of Bømlo (Old Norse: Bymbil). The name is possibly derived from the word bembel which means "navel" or "stomach", referring to the "thick" or "swollen" mountain formation of Siggjo. Another possibility is that the name is referring to Bǫmburr, the name of a mythological Norse dwarf.

Historically, the name of the municipality was spelled Bømmel. On 3 November 1917, a royal resolution changed the spelling of the name of the municipality to Bømlo.

=== Coat of arms ===
The coat of arms was granted on 29 February 1980. The official blazon is "Gules, a sea-leaf argent" (Norwegian: Eit kvitt sjøblad på raud botn). This means the arms have a red field (background) and the charge is the leaf of a water lily interlaced with a trefoil. The charge has a tincture of argent which means it is commonly colored white, but if it is made out of metal, then silver is used. The trefoil symbolizes its predecessors: Bremnes Municipality, Moster Municipality, and Bømlo Municipality, which were united in 1963. The water lily leaf was chosen because this heart-shaped design is an old Norwegian heraldic charge. The arms were designed by Magnus Hardeland. The municipal flag has the same design as the coat of arms.

=== Churches ===
The Church of Norway has four parishes (sokn) within Bømlo Municipality. It is part of the Sunnhordland prosti (deanery) in the Diocese of Bjørgvin.

Churches in Bømlo Municipality
Parish (sokn)	Church name	Location of the church	Year built
Bremnes	Bremnes Church	Svortland	1869
Bømlo	Bømlo Church	Langevåg	1960
Bømlo	Old Bømlo Church	Langevåg	1621
Lykling	Lykling Church	Lykling	1912
Moster	Moster Church	Mosterhamn	1874
Moster	Old Moster Church	Moster	12th century

== Geography ==
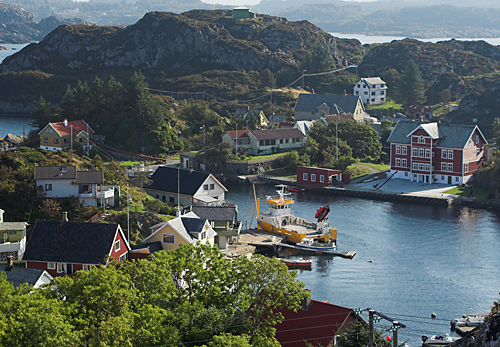
View of Espevær harbour

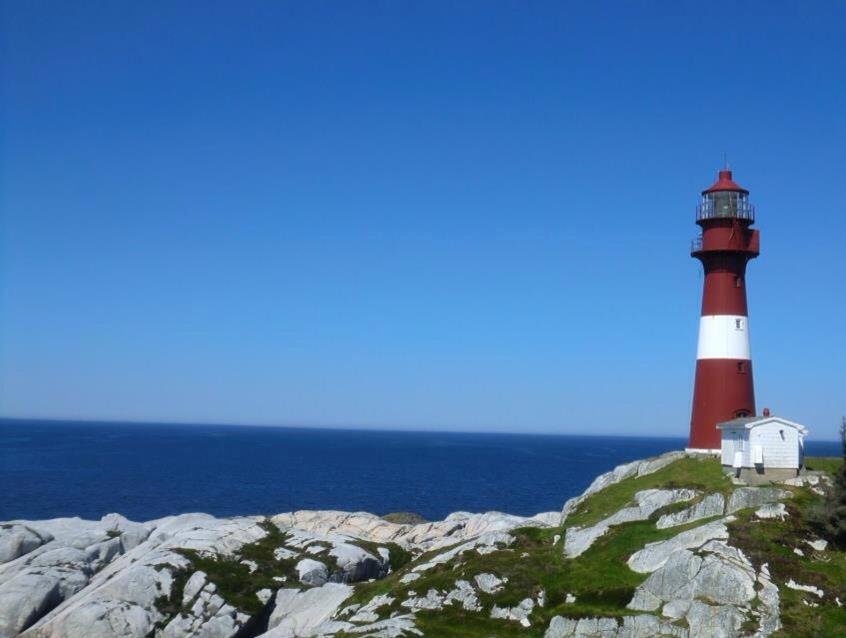
View of the Slåtterøy Lighthouse

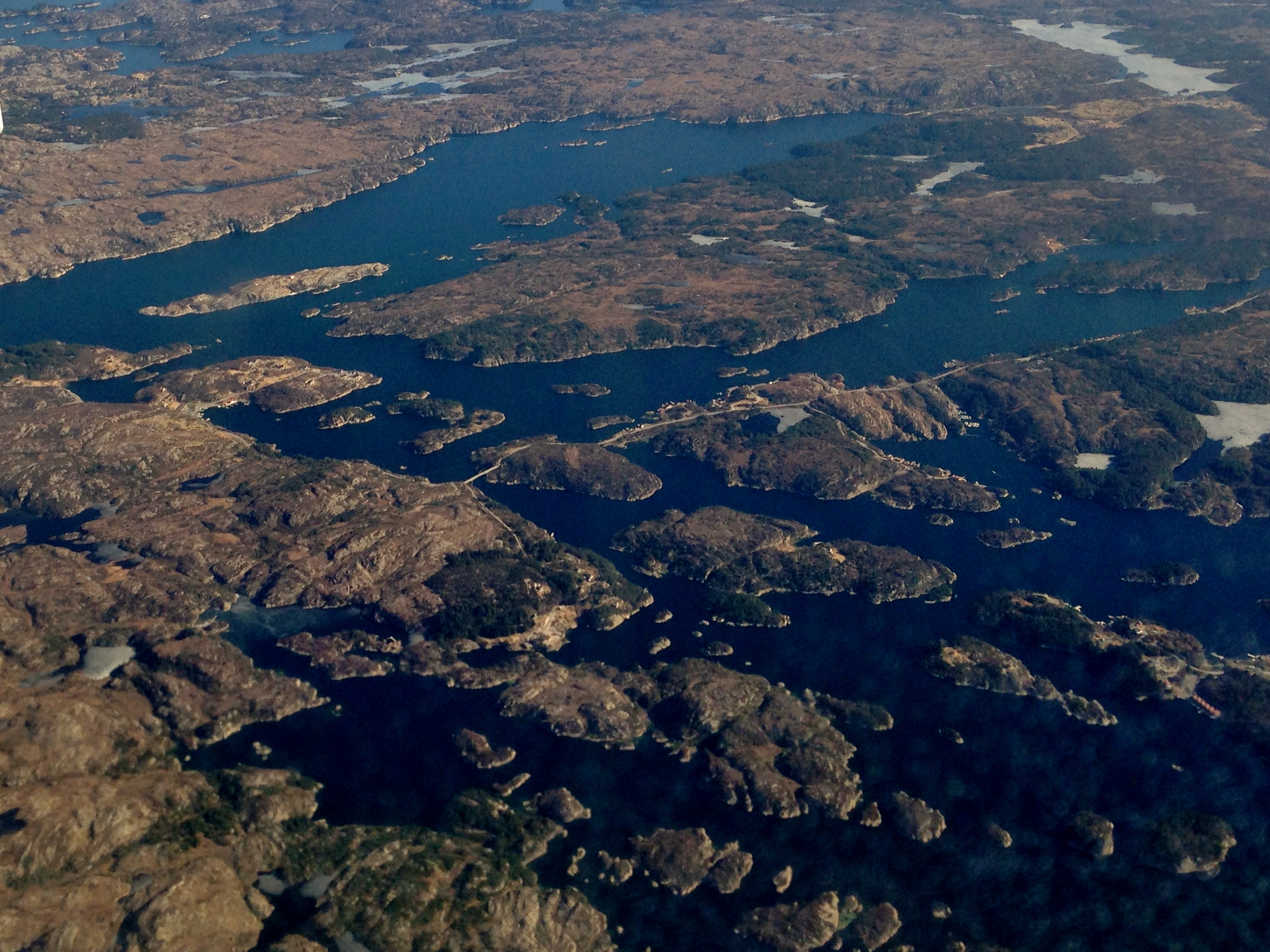
View of Goddo island

The municipality includes about 900 islands, islets, and skerries, although most are very small and uninhabited. The main island is also called Bømlo, and other notable islands in Bømlo municipality include Moster, Otterøya, Spyssøya, Goddo, and Espevær. The municipality lies north of the entrance to the Hardangerfjorden, south of the Selbjørnsfjorden, and west of the Stokksundet. The Innværfjorden is a small fjord that cuts into the island of Bømlo around the village of Rubbestadneset. The large island of Stord lies to the east. Bømlo is connected to Stord by the Triangle Link, which has made transportation to and from the municipality easier and more effective.

Bømlo is commonly distinguished in respect to residential ares. These areas include Svortland (previously Bremnes), Søra-Bømlo (South-Bømlo), Rubbestadneset, Moster, Finnås, Gilje, Goddo, and Hiskjo. Svortland is the administrative centre where there are stores, a cultural centre, schools and official buildings, and is located a bit north of the centre of the island. Moster is on the other hand more to the east with a high percentage of Christians devoted to at least three different christian denominations.

=== Siggjo ===
The highest point in the municipality is the 473.92-metre (1,554.9 ft) tall mountain Siggjo, on the island of Bømlo. The rocks on Siggjo contain large amounts of the igneous rock rhyolite, which was used in the Stone Age to create armament and tools. They have found rhyolite from Siggjo as far north as the Trøndelag region of Norway. Siggjo is a popular attraction among locals and tourists.

=== Lykling ===
The Lykling village area has become a popular tourist attraction, mainly due to its history of extensive gold mining in Lyklingeberga. The discovery of gold in 1862 by a young shepherd, led to several constructions being built in the area. These were built by three major companies, mainly financed and run by English businessmen. In addition to the mining constructions, there was also built two hotels, one hotelship, several bakeries, and a number of retail stores. Mining activity started in 1882 and ended in 1910, lasting more than 25 years.

== Climate ==
Bømlo, facing the North Sea, has a temperate oceanic climate (Cfb, marine west coast), with few temperature extremes. The wettest season is September – January, and the driest is April–July. The all-time high temperature is 30.9 °C (87.6 °F) recorded 26 July 2019. The all-time low is −12.6 °C (9.3 °F) recorded 11 January 1987. The five months June – October have never recorded overnight freezes. The average date for the last overnight freeze (low below 0 °C (32.0 °F)) in spring is 19 March and average date for first freeze in autumn is 5 December, among the latest in Norway (1981-2010 average). The weather station at Slåtterøy lighthouse has been recording temperature since 1923.

Climate data for Slåtterøy Lighthouse 1991-2020 (25 m, extremes 1954-2020)
Month	Jan	Feb	Mar	Apr	May	Jun	Jul	Aug	Sep	Oct	Nov	Dec	Year
Record high °C (°F)	12.5 (54.5)	11.2 (52.2)	15.1 (59.2)	22.9 (73.2)	26.4 (79.5)	28 (82)	30.9 (87.6)	29.6 (85.3)	25.7 (78.3)	21.4 (70.5)	16.7 (62.1)	12.6 (54.7)	30.9 (87.6)
Mean daily maximum °C (°F)	5.2 (41.4)	4.6 (40.3)	5.6 (42.1)	8.5 (47.3)	11.4 (52.5)	14.1 (57.4)	16.4 (61.5)	17.3 (63.1)	15 (59)	11.5 (52.7)	8.2 (46.8)	6.2 (43.2)	10.3 (50.6)
Daily mean °C (°F)	3.7 (38.7)	3 (37)	3.9 (39.0)	6.4 (43.5)	9.2 (48.6)	12.1 (53.8)	14.5 (58.1)	15.3 (59.5)	13.2 (55.8)	9.8 (49.6)	6.7 (44.1)	4.6 (40.3)	8.5 (47.3)
Mean daily minimum °C (°F)	2 (36)	1.4 (34.5)	2.3 (36.1)	4.5 (40.1)	7.5 (45.5)	10.5 (50.9)	12.9 (55.2)	13.6 (56.5)	11.6 (52.9)	8.2 (46.8)	5 (41)	3 (37)	6.9 (44.4)
Record low °C (°F)	−12.6 (9.3)	−10 (14)	−8.3 (17.1)	−3.6 (25.5)	−3.1 (26.4)	3.6 (38.5)	7 (45)	8 (46)	4.4 (39.9)	0.3 (32.5)	−5.7 (21.7)	−10.2 (13.6)	−12.6 (9.3)
Average precipitation mm (inches)	135 (5.3)	113 (4.4)	100 (3.9)	87 (3.4)	68 (2.7)	74 (2.9)	86 (3.4)	119 (4.7)	139 (5.5)	161 (6.3)	163 (6.4)	149 (5.9)	1,394 (54.8)
Source 1: eklima/Norwegian Meteorological Institute
Source 2: NOAA-WMO averages 91-2020 Norway

== Government ==
Bømlo Municipality is responsible for primary education (through 10th grade), outpatient health services, senior citizen services, welfare and other social services, zoning, economic development, and municipal roads and utilities. The municipality is governed by a municipal council of directly elected representatives. The mayor is indirectly elected by a vote of the municipal council. The municipality is under the jurisdiction of the Haugaland og Sunnhordland District Court and the Gulating Court of Appeal.

=== Municipal council ===
The municipal council (Kommunestyre) of Bømlo Municipality is made up of 27 representatives that are elected to four-year terms. The tables below show the current and historical composition of the council by political party.

Bømlo kommunestyre 2023–2027
Party name (in Nynorsk)	Number of representatives
Labour Party (Arbeidarpartiet)	4
Progress Party (Framstegspartiet)	4
Conservative Party (Høgre)	6
Industry and Business Party (Industri‑ og Næringspartiet)	4
The Conservatives (Konservativt)	1
Christian Democratic Party (Kristeleg Folkeparti)	5
Centre Party (Senterpartiet)	2
Socialist Left Party (Sosialistisk Venstreparti)	1
Total number of members:	27

Bømlo kommunestyre 2019–2023
Party name (in Nynorsk)	Number of representatives
Labour Party (Arbeidarpartiet)	5
Progress Party (Framstegspartiet)	3
Green Party (Miljøpartiet Dei Grøne)	1
Conservative Party (Høgre)	7
The Christians Party (Partiet Dei Kristne)	1
Christian Democratic Party (Kristeleg Folkeparti)	5
Centre Party (Senterpartiet)	3
Socialist Left Party (Sosialistisk Venstreparti)	1
Liberal Party (Venstre)	1
Total number of members:	27

Bømlo kommunestyre 2015–2019
Party name (in Nynorsk)	Number of representatives
Labour Party (Arbeidarpartiet)	8
Progress Party (Framstegspartiet)	2
Green Party (Miljøpartiet Dei Grøne)	1
Conservative Party (Høgre)	5
The Christians Party (Partiet Dei Kristne)	1
Christian Democratic Party (Kristeleg Folkeparti)	5
Centre Party (Senterpartiet)	2
Socialist Left Party (Sosialistisk Venstreparti)	1
Liberal Party (Venstre)	2
Total number of members:	27

Bømlo kommunestyre 2011–2015
Party name (in Nynorsk)	Number of representatives
Labour Party (Arbeidarpartiet)	7
Progress Party (Framstegspartiet)	4
Conservative Party (Høgre)	7
The Christians Party (Partiet Dei Kristne)	2
Christian Democratic Party (Kristeleg Folkeparti)	4
Centre Party (Senterpartiet)	1
Liberal Party (Venstre)	2
Total number of members:	27

Bømlo kommunestyre 2007–2011
Party name (in Nynorsk)	Number of representatives
Labour Party (Arbeidarpartiet)	4
Progress Party (Framstegspartiet)	6
Conservative Party (Høgre)	9
Christian Democratic Party (Kristeleg Folkeparti)	5
Centre Party (Senterpartiet)	2
Liberal Party (Venstre)	1
Total number of members:	27

Bømlo kommunestyre 2003–2007
Party name (in Nynorsk)	Number of representatives
Labour Party (Arbeidarpartiet)	4
Progress Party (Framstegspartiet)	5
Conservative Party (Høgre)	8
Christian Democratic Party (Kristeleg Folkeparti)	6
Centre Party (Senterpartiet)	2
Socialist Left Party (Sosialistisk Venstreparti)	1
Liberal Party (Venstre)	1
Total number of members:	27

Bømlo kommunestyre 1999–2003
Party name (in Nynorsk)	Number of representatives
Labour Party (Arbeidarpartiet)	4
Progress Party (Framstegspartiet)	3
Conservative Party (Høgre)	8
Christian Democratic Party (Kristeleg Folkeparti)	11
Centre Party (Senterpartiet)	1
Liberal Party (Venstre)	2
Election List for South Bømlo (Valliste for Søre Bømlo)	6
Total number of members:	35

Bømlo kommunestyre 1995–1999
Party name (in Nynorsk)	Number of representatives
Labour Party (Arbeidarpartiet)	5
Progress Party (Framstegspartiet)	3
Conservative Party (Høgre)	6
Christian Democratic Party (Kristeleg Folkeparti)	10
Centre Party (Senterpartiet)	3
Liberal Party (Venstre)	5
Election list for South Bømlo (Valliste for Søre Bømlo)	7
Total number of members:	39

Bømlo kommunestyre 1991–1995
Party name (in Nynorsk)	Number of representatives
Labour Party (Arbeidarpartiet)	6
Progress Party (Framstegspartiet)	3
Conservative Party (Høgre)	4
Christian Democratic Party (Kristeleg Folkeparti)	8
Centre Party (Senterpartiet)	3
Liberal Party (Venstre)	10
Election list for South Bømlo (Valliste for Søre Bømlo)	3
Election list for Moster and Håvik (Valliste for Moster og Håvik)	2
Total number of members:	39

Bømlo kommunestyre 1987–1991
Party name (in Nynorsk)	Number of representatives
Labour Party (Arbeidarpartiet)	8
Progress Party (Framstegspartiet)	4
Conservative Party (Høgre)	6
Christian Democratic Party (Kristeleg Folkeparti)	8
Centre Party (Senterpartiet)	1
Liberal Party (Venstre)	4
Election list for South Bømlo (Valliste for Søre Bømlo)	5
Election list for Moster and Håvik (Valliste for Moster og Håvik)	3
Total number of members:	39

Bømlo kommunestyre 1983–1987
Party name (in Nynorsk)	Number of representatives
Labour Party (Arbeidarpartiet)	9
Progress Party (Framstegspartiet)	2
Conservative Party (Høgre)	9
Christian Democratic Party (Kristeleg Folkeparti)	11
Centre Party (Senterpartiet)	1
Liberal Party (Venstre)	3
Non-party election list for South Bømlo (Upolitisk valliste for Søre Bømlo)	2
Election list for Moster and Håvik (Valliste for Moster og Håvik)	2
Total number of members:	39

Bømlo kommunestyre 1979–1983
Party name (in Nynorsk)	Number of representatives
Labour Party (Arbeidarpartiet)	5
Conservative Party (Høgre)	10
Christian Democratic Party (Kristeleg Folkeparti)	13
Centre Party (Senterpartiet)	2
Liberal Party (Venstre)	4
Non-party election list for South Bømlo (Upolitisk valliste for Søre Bømlo)	2
Election list for Moster and Håvik (Valliste for Moster og Håvik)	3
Total number of members:	39

Bømlo kommunestyre 1975–1979
Party name (in Nynorsk)	Number of representatives
Labour Party (Arbeidarpartiet)	6
Conservative Party (Høgre)	6
Christian Democratic Party (Kristeleg Folkeparti)	13
New People's Party (Nye Folkepartiet)	1
Centre Party (Senterpartiet)	4
Liberal Party (Venstre)	1
Non-party common list for Finnås, Moster, and Bømlo (Upolitisk Samlingsliste for Finnås, Moster og Bømlo)	4
Election list for the Moster parish (Valliste for Moster Sokn)	3
Election list for the Steinsbø area (Valliste for Steinsbø Krins)	1
Total number of members:	39

Bømlo kommunestyre 1971–1975
Party name (in Nynorsk)	Number of representatives
Labour Party (Arbeidarpartiet)	6
Conservative Party (Høgre)	3
Christian Democratic Party (Kristeleg Folkeparti)	9
Centre Party (Senterpartiet)	6
Liberal Party (Venstre)	4
Local List(s) (Lokale lister)	11
Total number of members:	39

Bømlo kommunestyre 1967–1971
Party name (in Nynorsk)	Number of representatives
Labour Party (Arbeidarpartiet)	6
Conservative Party (Høgre)	3
Christian Democratic Party (Kristeleg Folkeparti)	7
Liberal Party (Venstre)	5
Local List(s) (Lokale lister)	18
Total number of members:	39

Bømlo kommunestyre 1963–1967
Party name (in Nynorsk)	Number of representatives
Labour Party (Arbeidarpartiet)	6
Conservative Party (Høgre)	3
Christian Democratic Party (Kristeleg Folkeparti)	9
Liberal Party (Venstre)	6
Local List(s) (Lokale lister)	15
Total number of members:	39

Bømlo heradsstyre 1959–1963
Party name (in Nynorsk)	Number of representatives
Local List(s) (Lokale lister)	15
Total number of members:	15
Note: On 1 January 1963, Bremnes Municipality and Moster Municipality became part of Bømlo Municipality.

Bømlo heradsstyre 1955–1959
Party name (in Nynorsk)	Number of representatives
Local List(s) (Lokale lister)	15
Total number of members:	15

Bømlo heradsstyre 1951–1955
Party name (in Nynorsk)	Number of representatives
Local List(s) (Lokale lister)	12
Total number of members:	12

Bømlo heradsstyre 1947–1951
Party name (in Nynorsk)	Number of representatives
Local List(s) (Lokale lister)	12
Total number of members:	12

Bømlo heradsstyre 1945–1947
Party name (in Nynorsk)	Number of representatives
Local List(s) (Lokale lister)	12
Total number of members:	12

Bømlo heradsstyre 1937–1941*
Party name (in Nynorsk)	Number of representatives
Labour Party (Arbeidarpartiet)	1
Local List(s) (Lokale lister)	11
Total number of members:	12
Note: Due to the German occupation of Norway during World War II, no elections were held for new municipal councils until after the war ended in 1945.

=== Mayors ===
The mayor (Nynorsk: ordførar) of Bømlo Municipality is the political leader of the municipality and the chairperson of the municipal council. The following people have held this position:

- 1916–1919: Lauritz Larsen
- 1920–1934: Lauritz Eide
- 1934–1944: Johannes Tvedt
- 1945–1946: Ludvig Amundsen
- 1947–1963: Enok Eide
- 1963–1971: Gunnar Mjånes (KrF)
- 1971–1975: Malvin Meling (H)
- 1975–1983: Arne M. Haldorsen (KrF)
- 1983–1985: Bjarne Kristiansen (Ap)
- 1985–1987: Bjørn Lavik (KrF)
- 1988–1995: Annemor Jensen (V)
- 1995–1997: Marit Elisebet Totland (KrF)
- 1997–1999: Ola Ersland (H)
- 1999–2011: Inge Reidar Kallevåg (H)
- 2011–2019: Odd Harald Hovland (Ap)
- 2019–2023: Sammy Olsen (Sp)
- 2023–present: Morten Helland (KrF)

== Culture ==
Bømlo Municipality is regionally known for several musical theatres and other theatrical productions performed in Moster Amfi, a local amphitheatre. The most famous performance, Mostraspelet, surrounds the topics of how Christianity arrived to Norway via Bømlo, late during the first millennium.

In 1975, the island of Espevær became known for its conspirative 'UFO-Ring', a physical imprint to the ground supposedly made from a stationed UFO, which is still visible as of 2012.

=== Sports ===
Many local youths are active in some form of sport or activity, either as a hobby, as part of education, or sometimes even with the specific goal of becoming a professional.

Association football is one of the most popular sports played by the male population on the island. In recent years, there has been an increasing number of female footballers as well. Children often start playing football at an early age, and many play active for several years. As their skills develop, they are systematically graded up (or down) in divisions, a type of ranking system. Notable soccer players, such as Arne Larsen Økland, Geirmund Brendesæter, and Gunnar Meling, started their careers in Bremnes IL, one of the local sports clubs. Former top player and current coach for SK Brann, Mons Ivar Mjelde, had a brief stay at Moster IL.

Other popular sports and activities include team handball, motocross, athletics, shooting sports, social dance, floorball, baton twirling, rhythmic gymnastics, swimming, and martial arts.

== Population ==
Historical population
Year	1916	1951	1960	1970	1980	1990	2000	2010	2020	2023
Pop.	1,217	1,407	1,492	8,339	9,213	9,675	10,739	11,275	11,957	12,132
±% p.a.	—	+0.42%	+0.65%	+18.78%	+1.00%	+0.49%	+1.05%	+0.49%	+0.59%	+0.49%
Note: The municipal borders were changed in 1963 and 1995, causing a significant change in the population. Source: Statistics Norway and Norwegian Historical Data Centre

== Industry and economy ==
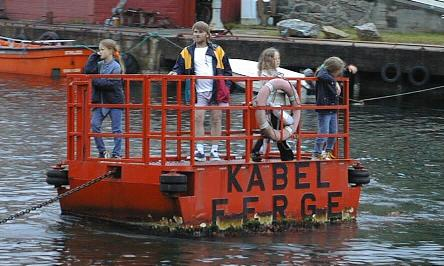
Chain ferry at Espevær

Wärtsilä, Eidesvik Offshore, Brandasund fiskeforedling, and Bremnes Seashore are notable industries, all of which are active in industries somehow related to the ocean. This, as well as tourism and agriculture, constitutes the main industries of Bømlo.

The economy of Bømlo is largely sustained by Eidesvik Offshore, Wärtsilä, fishing industry, tourism and general offshore related work.

== Education ==
There are several schools in the area. They are all named according to their geographical locations, and include Svortland, Gilje, Meling, Folderøy, Våge, Håvik, and Espevær, which comprises students from 1st through 7th grade. Rubbestadneset, Moster, and Hillestveit have students from 1st through 10th grade. Bremnes Ungdomsskule, often abbreviated BUS, is located in Svortland, and gathers most students from 8th through 10th grade. There are two upper secondary schools, Bømlo Vidaregåande skule and Rubbestadnes Vidaregåande Skule (formerly Rubbestadnes Yrkesskule).

There is also a Folk High School, Olavskulen Folkehøgskule, which is located at Finnås.

== Transport ==
An extensive tunnel and bridge system, the Triangle Link, connected Bømlo to the mainland and neighboring island Stord on 30 April 2001. It was officially opened on the latter date by king Harald V of Norway. The system includes the Bømlafjord Tunnel, the Bømla Bridge, and the Stord Bridge. The Norwegian County Road 542 is one of the main roads in Bømlo.

There is also a ferry that goes from Langevåg to Buavåg in Sveio Municipality, connecting the southern part of Bømlo to the mainland.

== Notable people ==
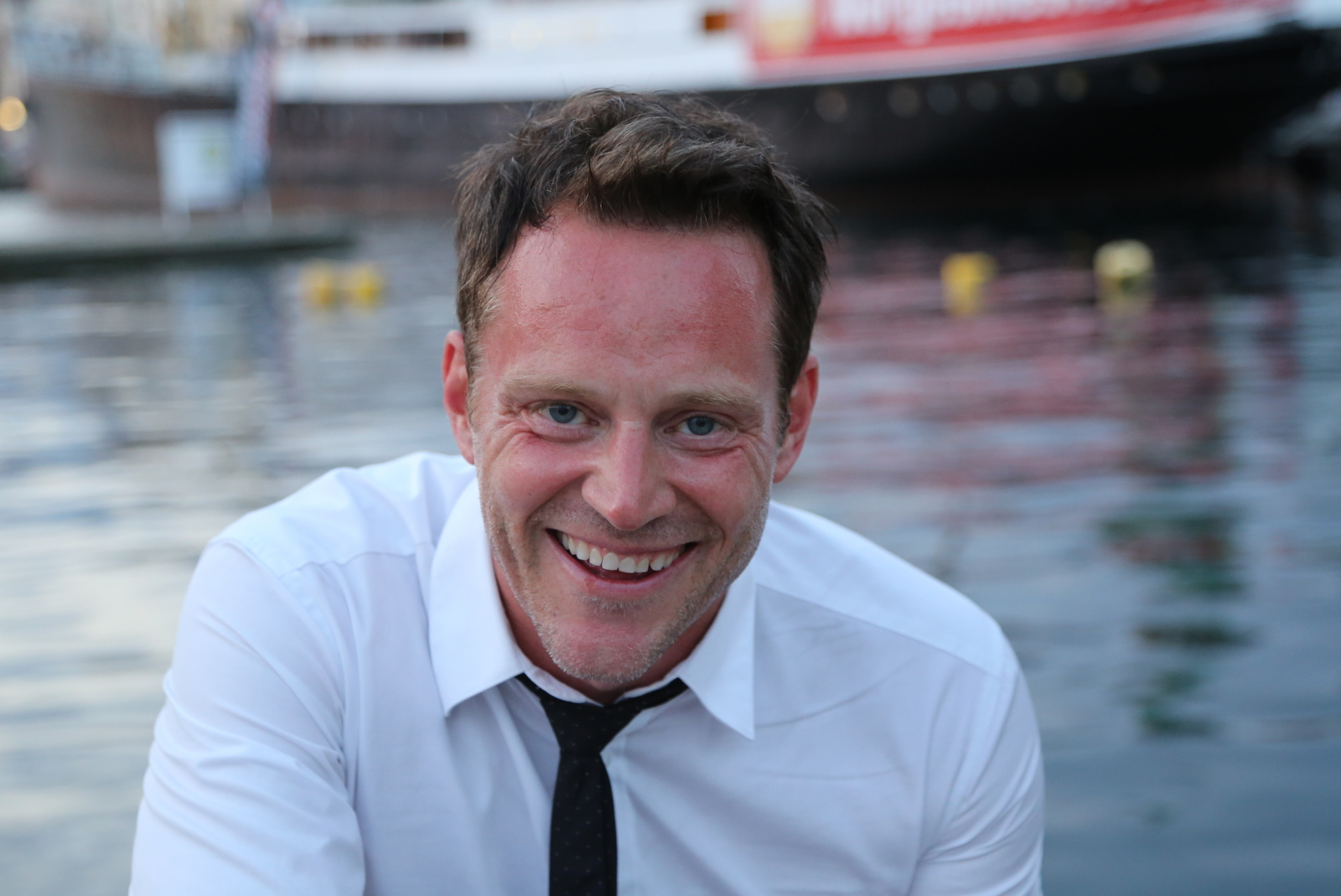
Heine Totland, 2014

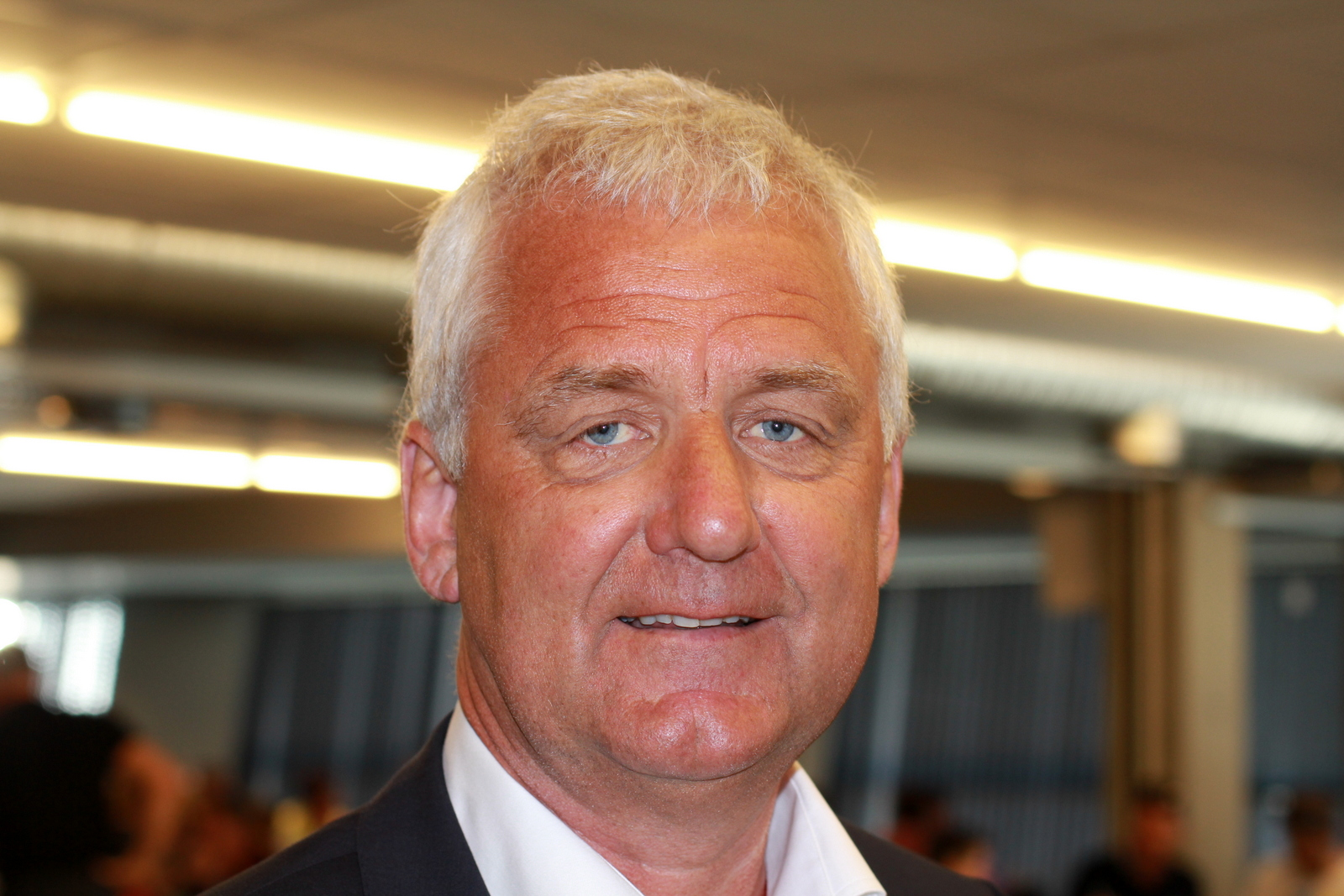
Arne Larsen Økland, 2014

- Niels Hertzberg (1759 Finnås – 1841), a priest and politician
- Gerhard Meidell Gerhardsen (1912 in Finnaas – 1986), an economist
- Finn Haldorsen (1934 in Rubbestadneset – 2005), a businessman who set up the Rubb group
- Kjell Habbestad (born 1955 in Bømlo), a contemporary composer
- Kenneth Sivertsen (1961 in Bømlo – 2006), a musician, composer, poet, and comedian
- Heine Totland (born 1970 in Moster), a singer
- Knut Arild Hareide (born 1972 in Rubbestadneset), a politician

=== Sport ===
- Arne Larsen Økland (born 1954 in Bømlo), a former footballer with 280 club caps and 54 for Norway
- Joakim Våge Nilsen (born 1991 in Bømlo), a footballer with 240 club caps
