= Lykling Church =

Church in Vestland, Norway

- Lykling kyrkje
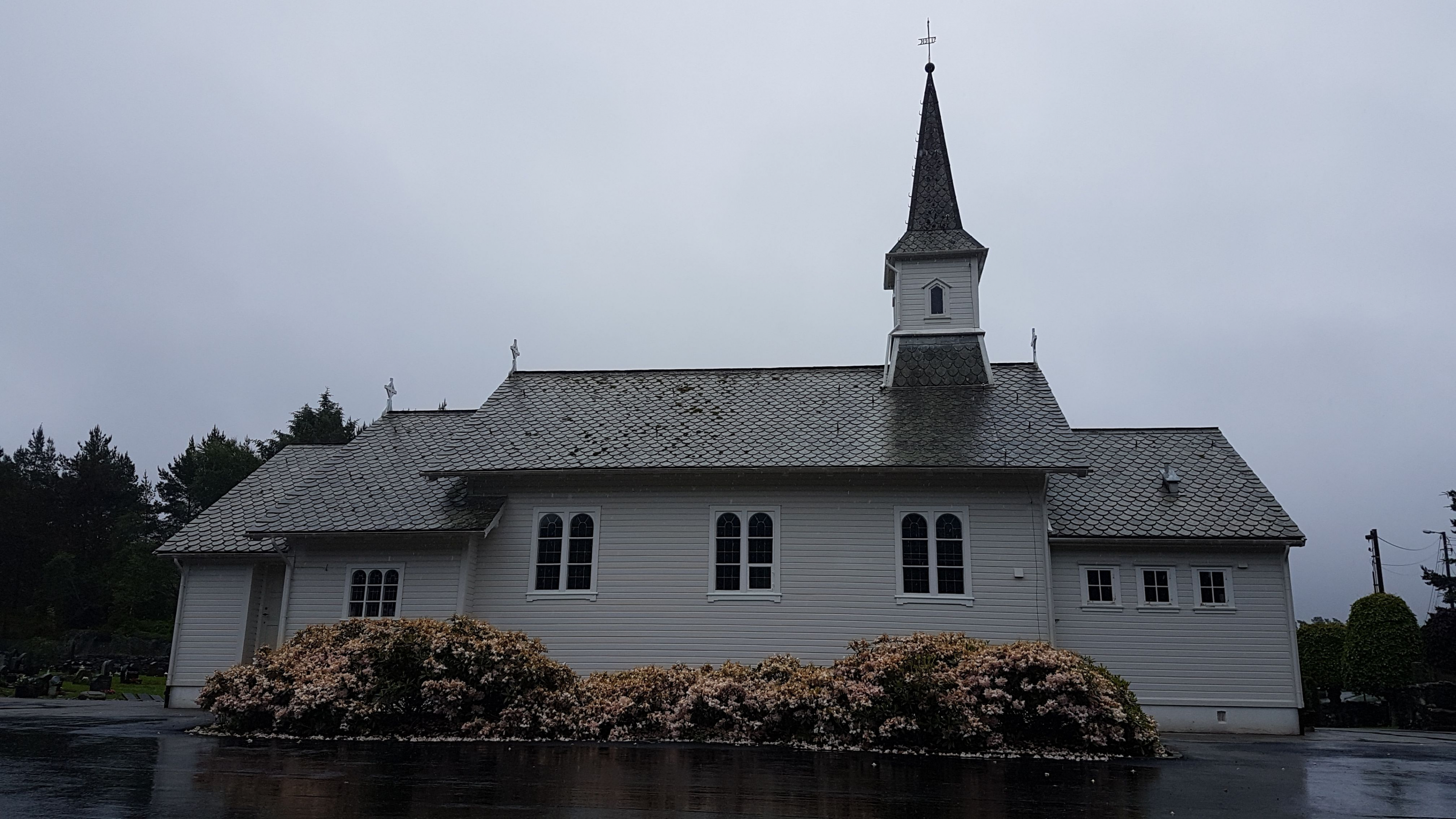
- View of the church
- Lykling Church
- 59°42′23″N 5°11′55″E
- Location: Bømlo Municipality, Vestland
- Country: Norway
- Denomination: Church of Norway
- Churchmanship: Evangelical Lutheran

History
- Status: Parish church
- Founded: 1912
- Consecrated: 1912

Architecture
- Functional status: Active
- Architect: Victor Nordan
- Architectural type: Long church
- Completed: 1912 (114 years ago)

Specifications
- Capacity: 200
- Materials: Wood

Administration
- Diocese: Bjørgvin bispedømme
- Deanery: Sunnhordland prosti
- Parish: Lykling
- Norwegian Cultural Heritage Site
- Type: Church
- Status: Not protected
- ID: 84348

Lykling Church (Norwegian: Lykling kyrkje) is a parish church of the Church of Norway in Bømlo Municipality in Vestland county, Norway. It is located in the village of Lykling on the island of Bømlo. It is the church for the Lykling parish which is part of the Sunnhordland prosti (deanery) in the Diocese of Bjørgvin. The white, wooden church was built in a long church design in 1912 using plans drawn up by the architect Victor Nordan. The church seats about 200 people.

== History ==
The church was built in 1912 according to drawings by architect Victor Nordan. Originally, it consisted of a rectangular, wooden nave and a narrower choir flanked by two sacristies that had a common roof with the choir. Overall, the choir and sacristy were slightly wider than the nave. It was expanded and rebuilt in 1973 according to drawings by architect Ole Halvorsen. During this remodel, the choir received a somewhat lower and narrower, extension to the east, flanked by small rooms. At the same time, a large church porch was added on the west side.

== See also ==
- List of churches in Bjørgvin
