= Gerhard Meidell Gerhardsen (economist) =

Norwegian economist

Gerhard Meidell Gerhardsen (3 June 1912 – 1 March 1986) was a Norwegian economist.

He was born in Finnaas Municipality as a son of bailiff, farmer and politician Gerhard Meidell Gerhardsen (1885–1931) and Helga Marie Selmer (1888–1935). He was a grandson of bailiff, farmer and politician Gerhard Meidell Gerhardsen (1848–1912).

He studied economics at the University of Oslo, and was hired in the Norwegian Directorate of Fisheries in Bergen in 1939. From 1947 to 1953 he led the Fisheries and Aquaculture Department of the Food and Agriculture Organization, and from 1952 to 1982 he was a professor of fishery economics at the Norwegian School of Economics and Business Administration. From 1957 to 1959 he had a connection to the Norwegian development project in Kerala as a fisheries expert; he released the critical book Det norske eksperiment i India in 1959. Another notable book was Fiskeriene i Norge from 1964. From 1967 to 1968 he returned to India as a fisheries advisor for the federal government.

He was a board member of the Norwegian College of Fishery Science and Norges fiskeriforskningsråd. His brother Thorvald Gerhardsen was the chairman of the latter organization.

Gerhard Meidell Gerhardsen was appointed as a Knight, First Class of the Order of St. Olav in 1982. He died in March 1986 in Bergen.
