= Bremnes Church =

Church in Vestland, Norway

- Bremnes kirke
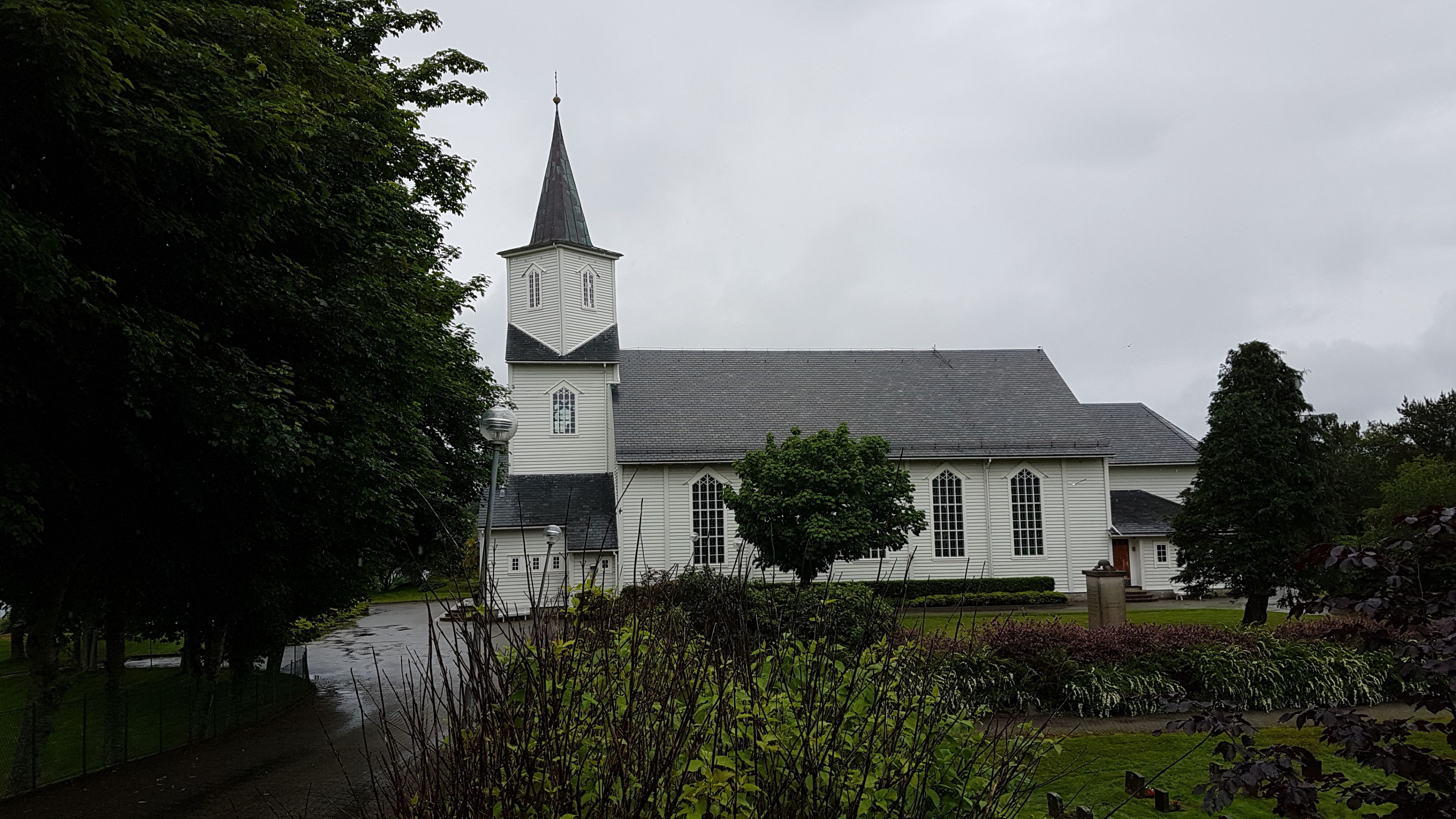
- View of the church
- Bremnes Church
- 59°47′43″N 5°10′27″E
- Location: Bømlo Municipality, Vestland
- Country: Norway
- Denomination: Church of Norway
- Previous denomination: Catholic Church
- Churchmanship: Evangelical Lutheran

History
- Status: Parish church
- Founded: 13th century
- Consecrated: 16 Sept 1869

Architecture
- Functional status: Active
- Architect: Jacob Wilhelm Nordan
- Architectural type: Long church
- Completed: 1869 (157 years ago)

Specifications
- Capacity: 750
- Materials: Wood

Administration
- Diocese: Bjørgvin bispedømme
- Deanery: Sunnhordland prosti
- Parish: Bremnes
- Norwegian Cultural Heritage Site
- Type: Church
- Status: Not protected
- ID: 83952

Bremnes Church (Norwegian: Bremnes kirke) is a parish church of the Church of Norway in Bømlo Municipality in Vestland county, Norway. It is located in the village of Svortland on the island of Bømlo. It is the church for the Bremnes parish which is part of the Sunnhordland prosti (deanery) in the Diocese of Bjørgvin. The white, wooden church was built in a long church design in 1869 using plans drawn up by the architect Jacob Wilhelm Nordan. The church seats about 750 people.

== History ==
The earliest existing historical records of the church date back to the year 1327, but it was considered an old church at that time. The first church here was a wooden stave church that was located in the nearby farm area of Gåsland (across the lake from the present location). This church was likely built during the 13th century. Historically, the church was called Gåsland Church (spelled Gaasland) since it was located on that farm. In 1689, the stave church was demolished and a new wooden long church was built in the same place by the builder Oluff Bysemb.

In 1852, the municipal council began discussing the idea of replacing this church with a new building. This discussion led to a dispute as to where the church should be located. After much debate, it was decided to build the church on the other side of the lake at Svortland, about 1 kilometre (0.62 mi) to the south. After the choice of plot was decided in 1864, the architect Jacob Wilhelm Nordan was commissioned to prepare drawings for the new church. In 1867, modified drawings were approved and the lead builder Ole Vangberg was hired to lead the construction work. The church was built during 1869 and it was consecrated on 16 September 1869. Ahead of the 100th anniversary in 1969, a major remodeling and repair of the building was carried out according to plans prepared by architect Ole Halvorsen from Bergen. During this project, the choir, the sacristies, and the church porch were all enlarged. Work began in May 1965 and ended in August 1966.

== See also ==
- List of churches in Bjørgvin
