= Svortland =

Village in Bømlo Municipality, Norway

Svortland Bremnes
- Village
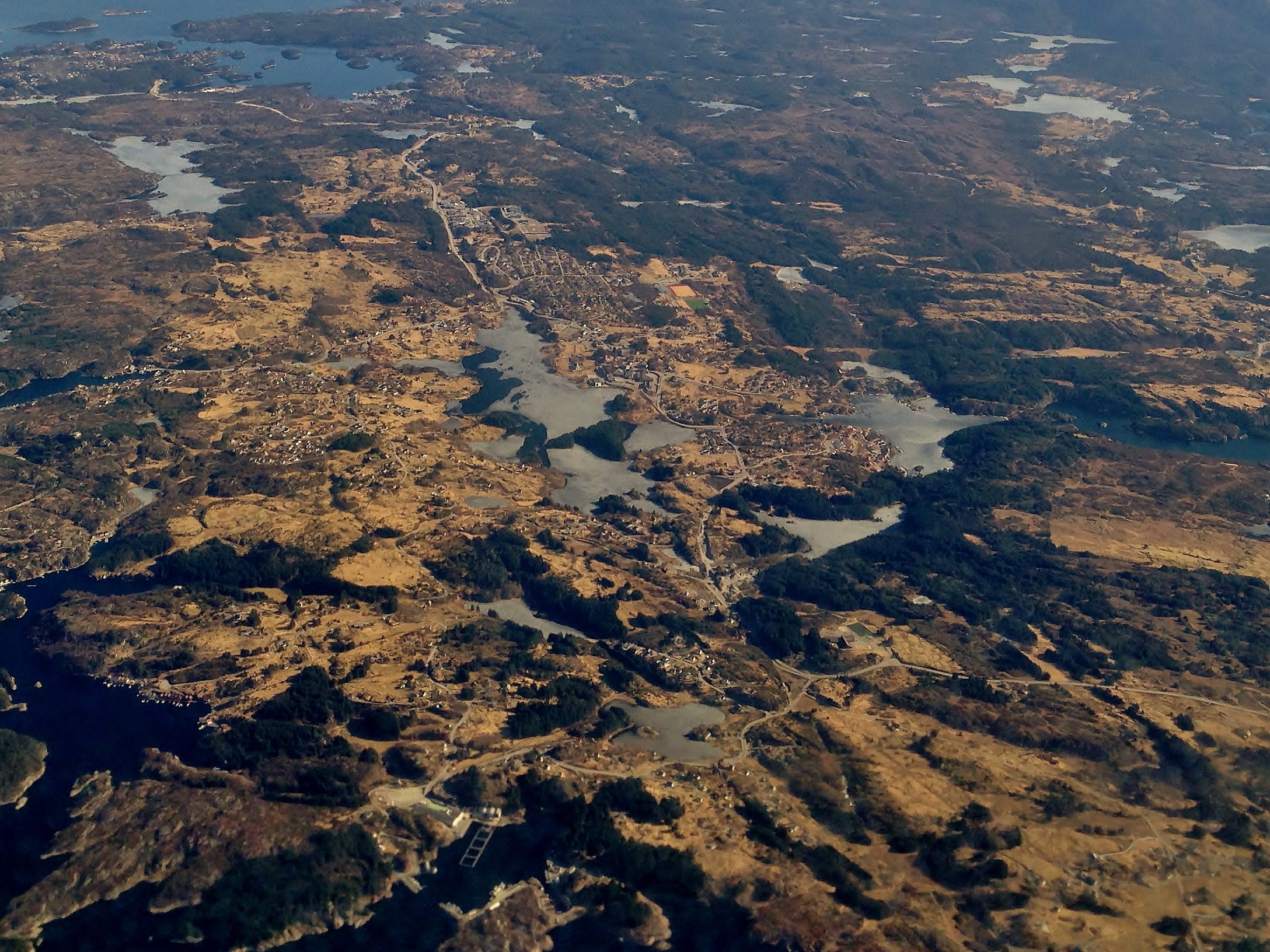
- View of the village area
- Interactive map of Svortland
- Coordinates: 59.79284°N 5.17226°E
- Country: Norway
- Region: Western Norway
- County: Vestland
- District: Sunnhordland
- Municipality: Bømlo Municipality

Area
  - Total: 2.81 km^{2} (1.08 sq mi)
- Elevation: 24 m (79 ft)

Population (2025)
  - Total: 3,146
  - Density: 1,120/km^{2} (2,900/sq mi)
- Time zone: UTC+01:00 (CET)
  - Summer (DST): UTC+02:00 (CEST)
- Post Code: 5430 Bremnes

Svortland is the administrative centre of Bømlo Municipality in Vestland county, Norway. The village is located in the north-central part of the island of Bømlo, about 6 kilometres (3.7 mi) west of the village of Rubbestadneset. The village surrounds the lake Storavatnet. The Norwegian County Road 542 runs through the village.

The 2.81-square-kilometre (690-acre) village has a population (2025) of 3,146 and a population density of 1,120 inhabitants per square kilometre (2,900/sq mi).

In addition to municipal services, Svortland is also the location of Bremnes Church, an elementary school, a medical centre, a community centre, and many stores and businesses.

The village was historically named Bremnes after the local church. There was also a local farm in Bremnes called Sortland, which was also used to refer to the area. In 1997, the municipal council officially named the urban area Svortland.
