= Sunnhordland =

- District
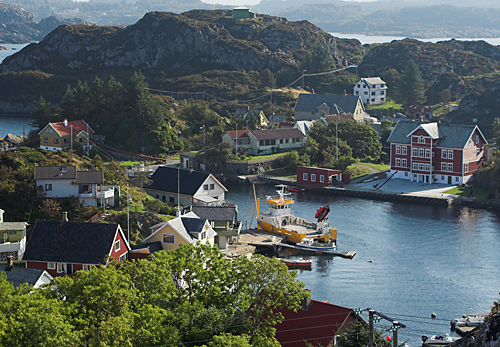
- Espevær in Bømlo Municipality

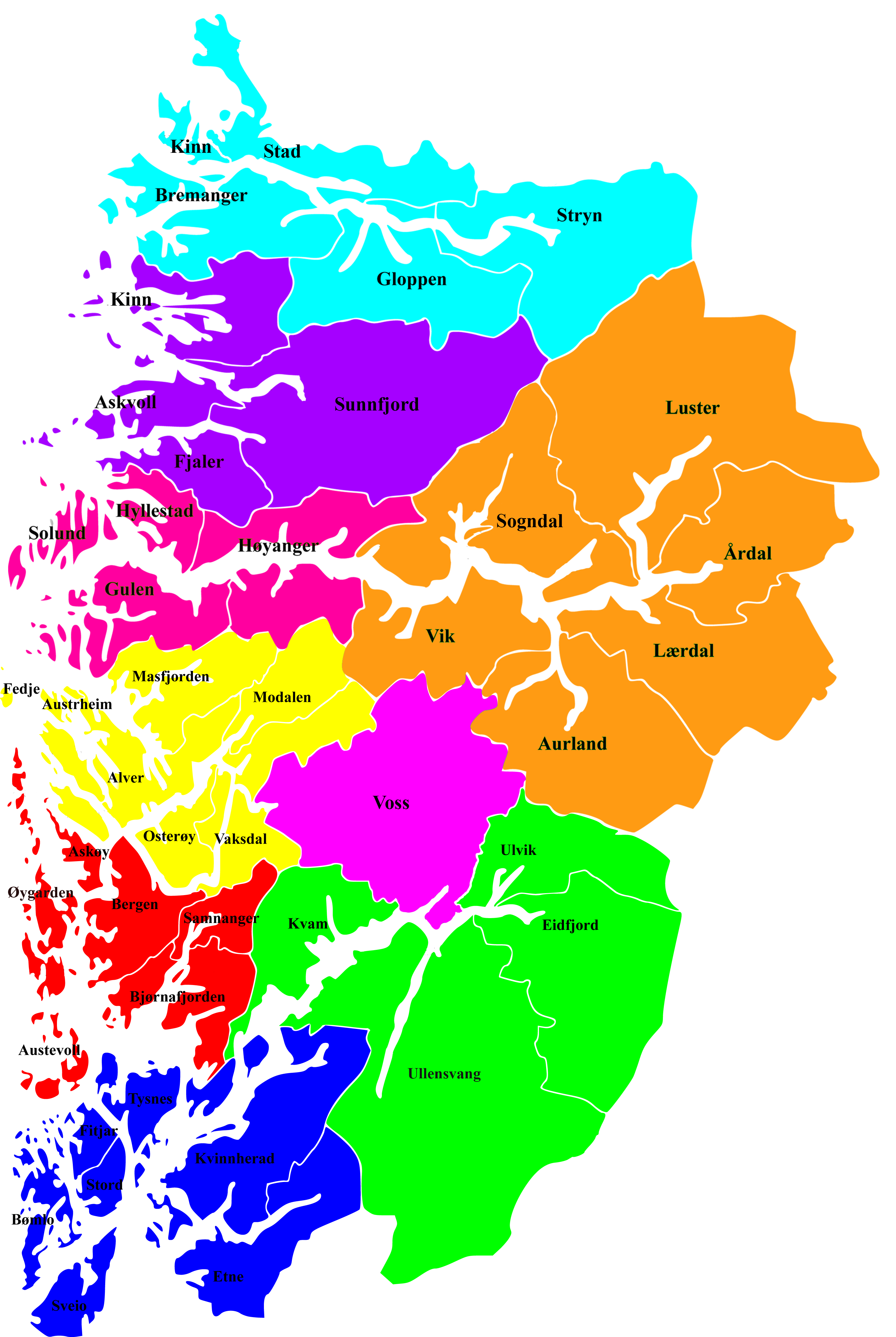
- Districts of Vestland: Nordfjord Sunnfjord Indre Sogn Ytre Sogn Nordhordland Midthordland Sunnhordland Hardanger Voss
- Country: Norway
- County: Vestland
- Region: Vestlandet
- Commercial Center: Stord

Area
  - Total: 2,860 km^{2} (1,100 sq mi)

Population (2014)
  - Total: 58,680
  - Density: 20.5/km^{2} (53.1/sq mi)

Sunnhordland is a traditional district in the western region of Norway. The district consists of the southern coastal regions of the old Hordaland county (now part of Vestland county). It includes the areas that surround the mouth of the Hardangerfjorden and the surrounding islands. The municipalities of Sveio, Etne, Stord, Bømlo, Fitjar, Kvinnherad, and Tysnes (and sometimes Austevoll) make up the district of Sunnhordaland. The regional centre of this district is the town of Leirvik in Stord Municipality.

In all, the district includes about 2,860 square kilometres (1,100 sq mi) of land. There were about 58,680 inhabitants in 2014, giving it a population density of about 20.5 inhabitants per square kilometre (53/sq mi). About 50% of the land area is mountainous land above 300 metres (980 ft) in elevation with most of the population living below that level in the valleys and coastal areas.

== Name ==
The name Sunnhordland is derived from "søndre Hordaland" which means "the southern part of Hordaland". It is similar in nature to the nearby districts of Nordhordland and Midhordland.

People from Sunnhordland are called Sunnhordlendinger and the people in this area speak a Norwegian dialect called Sunnhordlandsmål.
