= Bømlo (island) =

Island in Vestland, Norway

Bømlo Bømmeløy (unofficial)
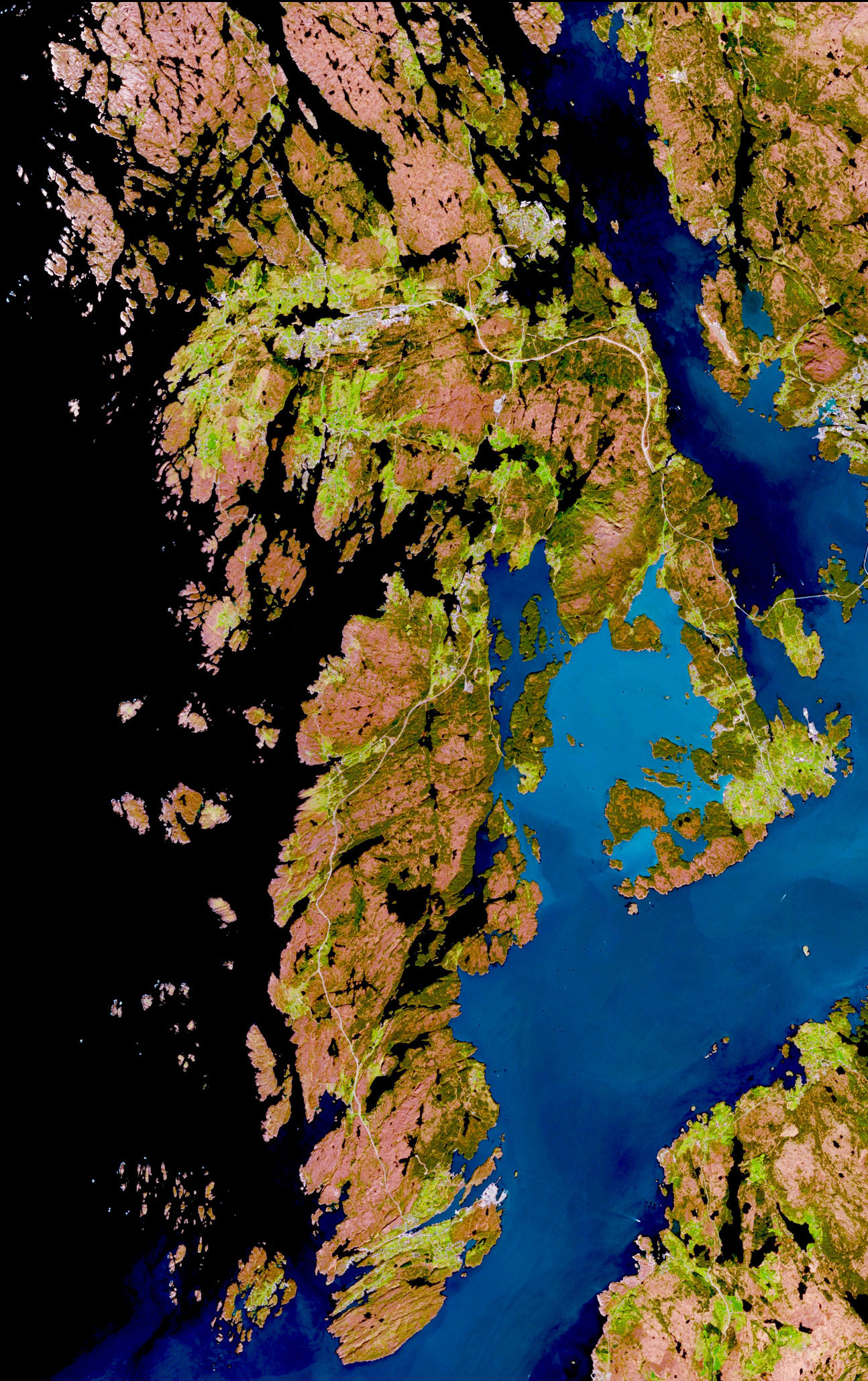
- View of the island by Sentinel-2
- Interactive map of the island

Geography
- Location: Vestland, Norway
- Coordinates: 59.77833°N 5.2347°E
- Area: 171 km^{2} (66 sq mi)
- Length: 33 km (20.5 mi)
- Width: 12 km (7.5 mi)
- Highest elevation: 474 m (1555 ft)
- Highest point: Siggjo

Administration
- Norway
- County: Vestland
- Municipality: Bømlo Municipality

Demographics
- Population: 9452 (2023)

Bømlo is an island in Vestland county, Norway. At 171 square kilometres (66 sq mi), it is the largest island in Bømlo Municipality, lying just off the western coast of Norway. The island sits at the northern entrance to the vast Hardangerfjorden, west of the Stokksund strait, south of the Selbjørnsfjorden, and east of the North Sea. In the 1800s, the Kulleseid Canal was built across a small isthmus in the central part of the island, giving a shortcut from the eastern side of the island to the western side of the island.

The large island of Stord lies just to the east and the smaller island of Moster lies to the southwest. There are hundreds of other small islands surrounding Bømlo. The island does have a permanent ferry-free road connection to the mainland via the Triangle Link: the Spissøy Bridge, the Bømla Bridge, and then the Bømlafjord Tunnel. The main settlements on the island include the villages of Svortland, Rubbestadneset, Foldrøyhamn, Langevåg, and Melandsvågen.

The flat surface that makes up Bømlo is a strandflat. This strandflat formed at least partly through weathering 210 million years ago during the Triassic period.

== See also ==
- List of islands of Norway
