= Rolf Hauge (army officer) =

Norwegian army officer

- Born: 1 July 1915; Bergen, Norway
- Died: 1989 (aged 73–74)
- Spouse: Margaret Gerrard Watt Burnett (m. 1942)
- Military career
- Allegiance: Norway
- Branch: Norwegian Army
- Service years: 1934–1972
- Rank: Colonel
- Units: Kongsberg and Bergen anti-aircraft command Norwegian Armed Forces in exile No. 10 (Inter-Allied) Commando; Norwegian Army Command Germany
- Commands: No. 5 Norwegian Troop; Artillery Regiment 3
- Conflicts: Second World War: Norwegian Campaign (POW); Battle of the Scheldt; Operation Infatuate (WIA); Operation Doomsday
- Awards: Norwegian: St. Olav's Medal with Oak Branch; War Medal; Defence Medal 1940–1945; Haakon VII 70th Anniversary Medal; British: Military Cross; 1939–45 Star; France and Germany Star

Rolf Hauge MC (1915 – 1989) was a Norwegian army officer with the rank of colonel. Having participated in the 1940 Norwegian Campaign, opposing the German invasion of Norway, he later served with the Norwegian Armed Forces in exile, commanding No. 5 Norwegian Troop of the No. 10 (Inter-Allied) Commando.

== Personal life ==
Hauge was born in Bergen, a son of Jørgen Ingjeldsen Hauge and Randi Urheim. He had his schooling at Bergen Cathedral School. He married Margaret Gerrard Watt Burnett from Scotland in 1942; the couple had a son in 1943. Hauge died in 1989.

== Pre-World War II ==
In 1934–35, Hauge studied at and graduated from the Norwegian field artillery's officer school. Following his first round of military studies, he studied social economics in 1935–37. In 1937 he began two years of studies at the Norwegian Military Academy, becoming a lieutenant serving in the Kongsberg and Bergen anti-aircraft command in 1939.

== World War II ==
During the Norwegian Campaign in 1940, Hauge took part in the defence of Rjukan from 9 April onwards. He had recently graduated from the Norwegian Military Academy as an anti-aircraft officer, and, as a lieutenant, commanded an improvised heavy machine gun company fighting at Rjukan until the forces there were dissolved on 3 May 1940, following the Allied evacuation from southern and central Norway. Although Rjukan and the entire county of Telemark had been considered by the Norwegian military leadership as having no strategic value, it was nonetheless defended following requests by the Allies, who wanted the heavy water production facilities at Rjukan defended against the advancing German forces. (Note: The German-controlled production of heavy water at Vemork near Rjukan ended in 1943, after a successful sabotage action by operatives from Norwegian Independent Company 1 and a bombing raid by American heavy bombers.)

After the end of the fighting in Rjukan, Hauge attempted to make his way through neutral Sweden to the areas in Northern Norway still controlled by Norway, but was handed over to the Germans by Swedish officials. Having been held as a prisoner by the Germans in Trondheim until June 1940, he made contact with the resistance movement later in 1940. He was arrested in December 1940, due to the discovery of a resistance group by the Germans, but was released shortly before Christmas, on parole with the obligation to report to the German occupiers.

Fearing further consequences, he decided to escape to Sweden. Here he was given tickets to travel the "long way" to Britain: aircraft to Moscow, by train to Odessa, by boat over the Black Sea, then by ship from Suez around the Cape of Good Hope to the Atlantic Ocean, finally ending up in Glasgow in September 1941. In Great Britain he joined the Norwegian Armed Forces in exile, where he served as second-in-command of Company 4 of the Norwegian Brigade. In June 1942 two infantry platoons from this company were sent to a shock troops training course at Fort William. In August 1942 Hauge was given the command of No. 5 Norwegian Troop of the No. 10 (Inter-Allied) Commando, with the rank of captain. Hauge was authorized to select volunteers from the whole Norwegian Brigade, but with the core from Company 4 which recently had undergone the shock troops training course. The unit was initially based in Nefyn in Wales, and underwent a standard three-week Commando Hardening Course in Achnacarry before they were accepted as commandos.

In January 1943 a detachment from the troop participated in Operation Cartoon, an attack on the pyrite mines of Stordø Kisgruber at Litlabø near Sagvåg in Stord Municipality, Norway. From May 1943 the unit was based in Eastbourne and went through intensive training in preparation for landing operations. From January 1944 they were stationed in Shetland, where they took part in raids to the Norwegian coast, and in June they moved back to Eastbourne. Hauge's unit took part in the Battle of the Scheldt, in particular the Operation Infatuate, the victorious attack on Walcheren in November 1944. Hauge's report from the attack on Walcheren is reprinted in Eystein Fjærli's book from 1982. The unit had a loss of four killed and seventeen wounded during the eight days of the attack, Hauge being amongst the wounded. While recuperating, Hauge was awarded the British Military Cross for his leadership during the Walcheren battle.

In January 1945, No. 5 Norwegian Troop took part in the attack on the island Kapelsche Veer, along with No. 47 (Royal Marine) Commando. This attack was not an immediate success, but the island was conquered by Canadian troops a few weeks later. After the first Norwegian assault against the German lines had resulted in more than 50% casualties, Hauge had called off the renewed attacks ordered by No. 47 (Royal Marine) Commando. No. 5 Norwegian Troop saw no further fighting during the war after the Kapelsche Veer attack, being instead sent to officially neutral Sweden on 1 May 1945. On 9 May 1945, eight days after arriving in Sweden, Hauge led No. 5 Norwegian Troop over the border to Norway to take part in the disarming of the surrendered German forces there. When Crown Prince Olav returned to Norway on 13 May, No. 5 Norwegian Troop formed his guard of honour.

Among Hauge's war decorations were the St. Olav's Medal With Oak Branch, the Norwegian War Medal, the Defence Medal 1940–1945, the Haakon VII 70th Anniversary Medal, the British Military Cross, the 1939–45 Star, and the France and Germany Star.

== Later career ==
Hauge continued his military career after World War II. He lectured at the Norwegian Military Academy from 1945 to 1946, studied at the Royal Swedish Academy of War Sciences from 1946 to 1948, and commanded a field artillery battalion of the Norwegian Army Command Germany in 1949. From 1951 to 1952 he served as a NATO staff officer, and from 1952 to 1958 he headed a field artillery training school. From 1958 to 1972 he headed the Norwegian field artillery regiment 3 in Trondheim, with the rank of colonel.

Hauge held lectures about his wartime front-line service at the Oslo-based officers' society Oslo Militære Samfund in November 1945 and November 1948.
