= Ottesens Skipsbyggeri =

Shipyard on the western coast of Norway

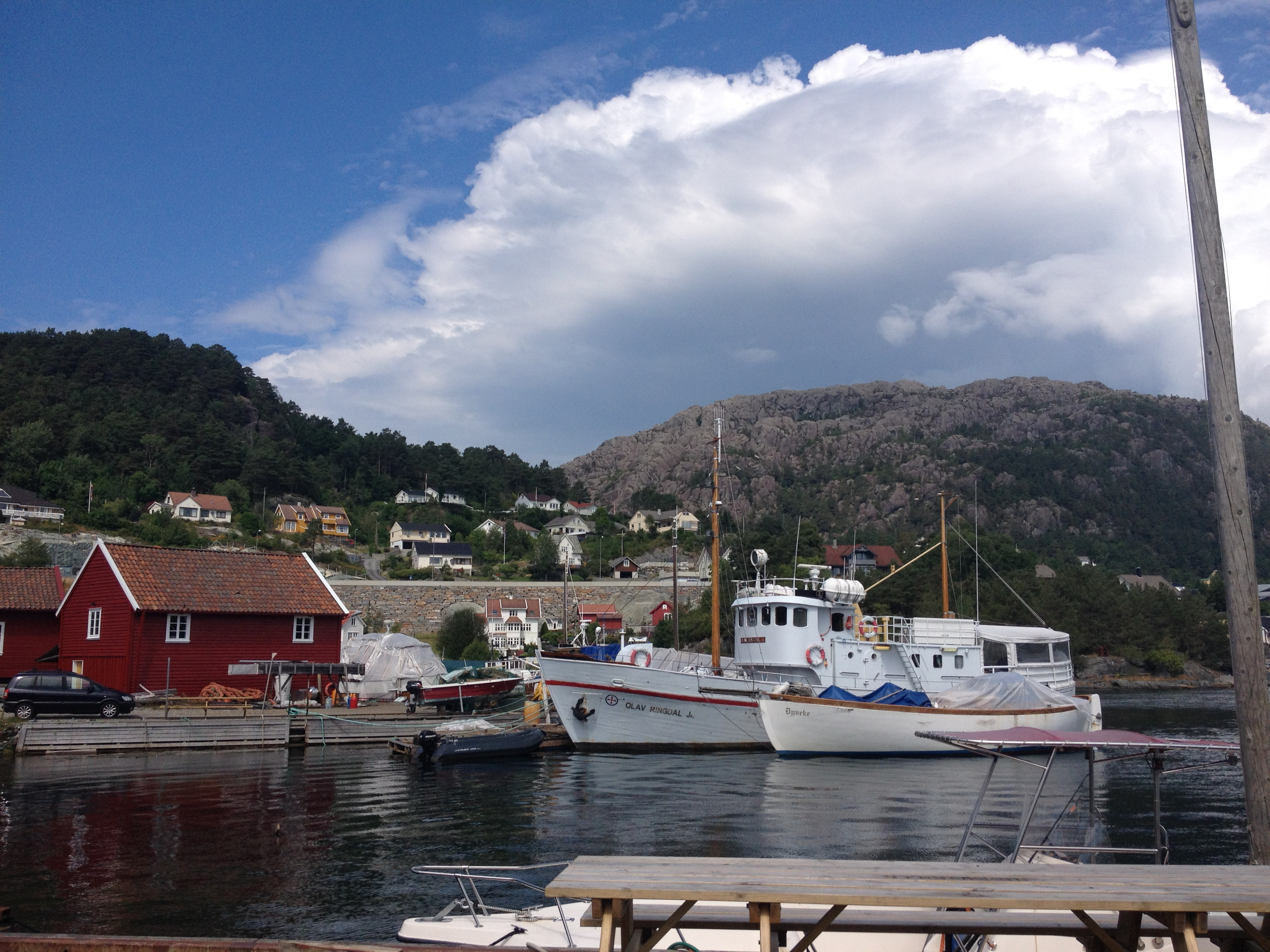
Premises of the former Ottesen skipsbyggeri

Ottesens Skipsbyggeri (lit. 'Ottesen's Shipyard') is a company located at Jensaneset in the village of Sagvåg in Stord Municipality on the western coast of Norway. The shipyard was founded in 1825, and at its height between 1902 and 1961, a total of 214 new ships were built on site. In periods with much activity, the company employed as many as 80 workers.

Today the company has the responsibility to maintain and develop the shipyard property, which consists of two areas designated as areas of special importance to industrial heritage.

== History ==
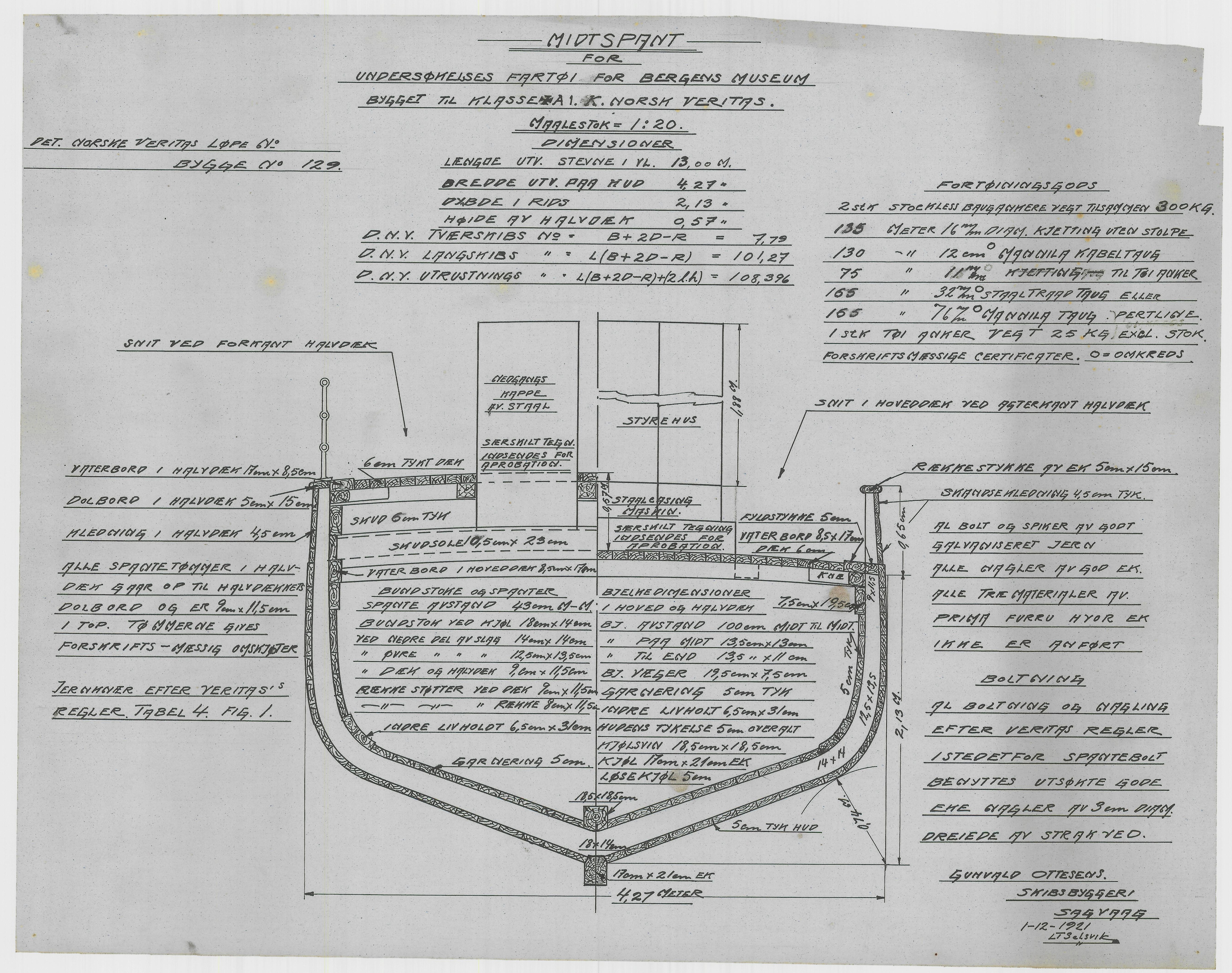
Schematics for marine research vessel «Herman Friele

Ottesens Skipsbyggeri was founded in 1825 by Otte Ottesen. The village of Sagvåg already housed several small shipyards at the time making it a skilled community in regards to ship construction. Towards 1900 several of the minor shipyards in the area were bought by Ottesens Skipsbyggeri. The first ships constructed at the shipyard were trading vessels entering the Baltic Sea trade, and fishing vessels for use in the North Sea and along the coast of Iceland.

Otte Ottesen's grandchildren acquired the company in 1902 and started massive modernisation efforts which included electrical lightning and the establishment of mechanical workshop.

In 1961 the shipyard stopped producing new ships, and focused on repairs.

Among the ships produced at the shipyard were several special duty ships; among others a marine research vessel called "Herman Friele" for the University of Bergen and ships used for search and rescue along the coast of Norway.

== Present status ==
The company has a responsibility to develop and maintain the shipyard property in accordance with the regulations for cultural heritage and environment in Stord municipality. The property consists of two areas designated as areas of special importance to industrial heritage. New structures is allowed on the property, as long as they keep true to the maritime influence of the area and use the building style of existing buildings.
