= Bømlafjord Tunnel =

Road tunnel in Norway

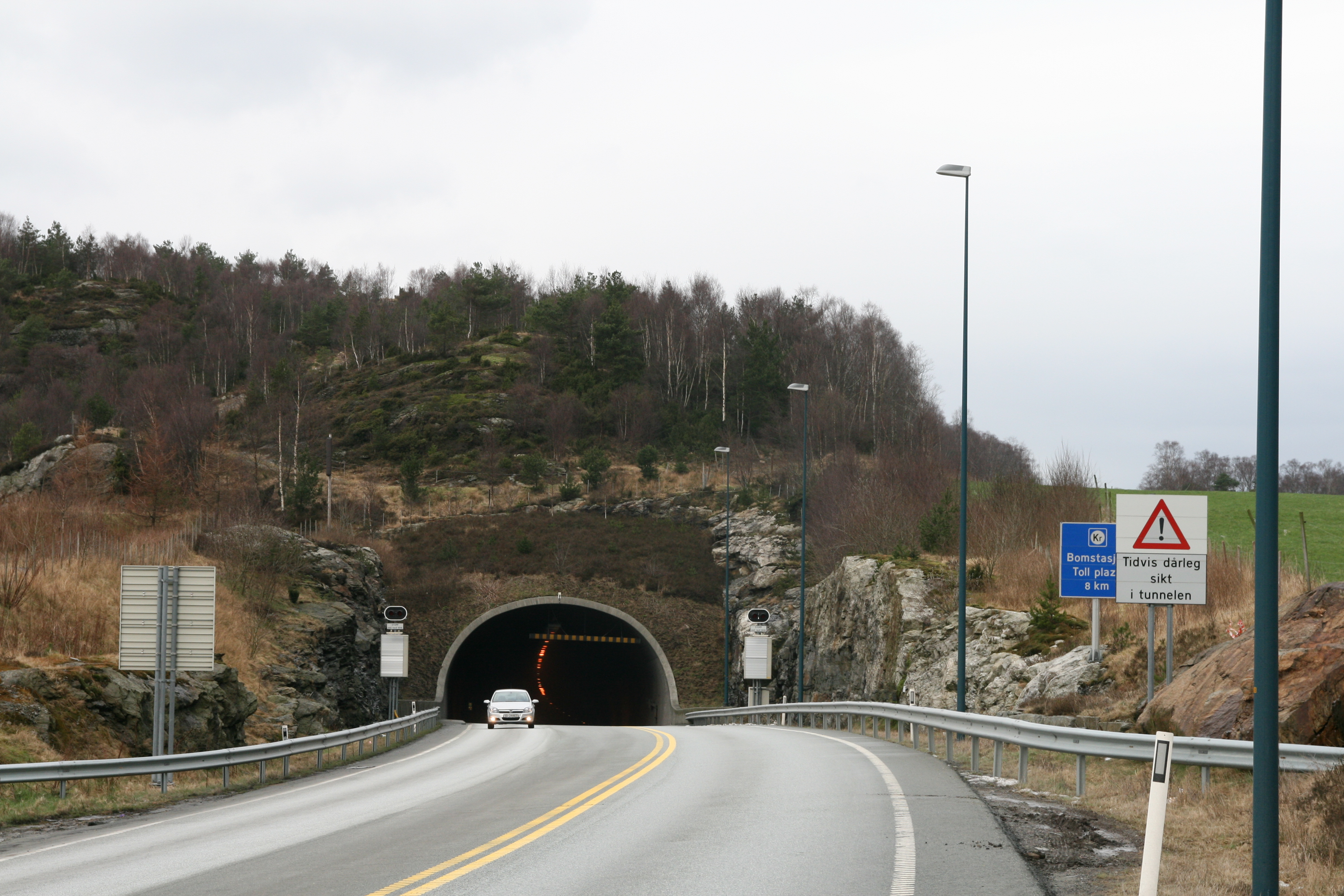
- Entrance to the tunnel from Sveio
- Interactive map of Bømlafjord Tunnel

Overview
- Location: Sveio Municipality and Stord Municipality, Norway
- Coordinates: 59.72216°N 5.43896°E
- Route: E39
- Start: Føyno
- End: Dalshovda

Operation
- Work began: 16 September 1997
- Opened: 27 December 2000
- Operator: Norwegian Public Roads Administration
- Toll: No
- Vehicles per day: 4,974 (2016)

Technical
- Length: 7,820 m (25,660 ft)
- No. of lanes: 3
- Operating speed: 80 km/h (50 mph)
- Min elevation: −260.4 m (−854 ft)
- Grade: 9%

The Bømlafjord Tunnel (Norwegian: Bømlafjordtunnelen) is a subsea road tunnel under Bømlafjorden which connects the island of Føyno in Stord Municipality to the mainland at Dalshovda in Sveio Municipality in Vestland county, Norway. The tunnel is 7.82 kilometers (4.86 mi) long and reaches 260.4 m (854 ft) below mean sea level. It carries three lanes of European Road E39 and is part of the Triangle Link, a fixed link which connects Sunnhordland to Haugaland. Plans for the tunnel arose in the 1980s; construction started in 1997 and the tunnel opened on 27 December 2000. The tunnel was built using the drilling and blasting method, with two teams building from each end. The tunnel runs through an area composed mostly of gneiss, phyllite and greenstone. The tunnel was the longest subsea tunnel in Norway until the opening of Karmøytunnelen. It is still (2013) the deepest point on the E-road network. The tunnel was a toll road from the opening until 30 April 2013. In 2012 the tunnel had an average 4,084 vehicles per day.

== Planning ==
The background for the Triangle Link was the desire to have a fixed link between the islands of Stord and Bømlo. The first documented proposals were made in the 1960s and involved building a pontoon bridge across Stokksundet. Following the 1982 opening of the Vardø Tunnel—the first subsea tunnel in Norway—Engineer Finn Nitter d.e. proposed a fixed link between the two islands. It would have crossed Digernessundet on a suspension bridge and continued along a causeway and low bridge onwards to a 2.2-kilometer-long (1.4 mi) subsea tunnel under Spissøysundet and a low bridge over Gassasundet. In addition, a 7.5-kilometer (4.7 mi) long tunnel would have been built from Føyno to Ulveråker in Sveio. The company Johannes Sørlie launched an all-tunnel proposal in 1985, estimated to cost 700 million Norwegian krone (NOK) and which would have resulted in 18 kilometers (11 mi) of subsea tunnel connecting Bømlo, Stord and the mainland. An inter-municipal committee was positive to the proposals, while Josef Martinsen, director of Hordaland Public Roads Administration, stated that the project was unrealistic. The limited company Ytre Sunnhordland Bru- og Tunnelselskap AS (SBT) was founded in October 1986 by the municipal authorities of Bømlo, Stord, Fitjar and Sveio, Hordaland County Municipality and five banks.

In December 1986, the Public Roads Administration recommended a bridge. A report published by SBT in 1987 considered detailed plans for a subsea tunnel to the mainland, which was followed up by seismic surveys in the fjord. SBT changed its name to Sunnhordland Bru- og Tunnelselskap, and a majority of the board shifted towards being in favor of a fixed link. The Norwegian Coastal Administration stated that they would not allow a pontoon bridge, as it would interfere with ship traffic. On 26 June 1987, SBT's board decided to work towards getting permission to collect advance tolls on the ferry services. On 16 September, they unanimously supported the triangular proposal, which was estimated to cost NOK 660 million. This was criticized by Hordaland Public Roads Administration, who stated that it would take a longer time to plan, and thus complete, the Triangle Link.

From 1988, environmental groups started opposing the Triangle Link. The most active was the local chapter of the Norwegian Society for the Conservation of Nature, who stated that the road would have a negative impact for local boat traffic to the recreational islands of Føyno and Nautøya. They therefore recommended that the municipalities select a pontoon bridge. Another opponent to the project was the Action Committee Against a Hasty Construction of the Triangle Link, who wanted to delay the decision until after the 1991 municipal elections to ensure that the municipal councils had backing in the public. Also Gisle Tjong, a local citizen, opposed the project, stating that the risk was too large and that it was uncertain how long the tolls would last. He argued that the tolls could just as well last 60 as 15 years. Instead, he wanted to use advance tolls and fuel fees, place the income in the bank and then pay the whole fixed link with the saved-up funds. Most of the opposition against the project was from Stord, while in Bømlo there was near consensus in favor of the project. The exception was in southern Bømlø, where there was concerns that their ferry service to the mainland would be terminated, which would result in considerably longer driving time to Haugesund. Concerns were also raised regarding people with fear of tunnels and proposals were made to keep a ferry service for such people.

The Triangle Link was passed by the various municipal councils in February and March 1988. Hordaland Public Roads Administration still supported a pontoon bridge, and stated that two and a half years of work on a master plan had been wasted. A new master plan for the Triangle Link was published in early 1989. It recommended that the Langevåg–Buavåg Ferry, which connected to southern Bømlo, remain, but that the other four ferry services be terminated. During late 1989, advance tolling on the ferries was approved by the municipal councils and the county council, who recommended that collection start from 1 July 1990. However, the start date was not supported by the national government and the issue placed on hold.

In July 1992, the master plan was passed by the Council of State. On 10 December 1992, Parliament approved advanced payment of tolls on the ferry, which were made effective from 1 January 1993. Ticket prices increased by between NOK 10 and 12. This resulted in protests from the ferry employees who stated that they would have to collect the tolls which would remove their jobs; Norwegian Seafarers' Union representatives stated that they considered suing the state. Work on the development plan started in 1992. It included safety and environmental improvements which increased the project's cost by NOK 200 million, and it was made subject to consultative statements in May 1994. A report on the Coastal Highway (E39) was published in 1995, which recommended that the Skjersholmane–Valevåg Ferry be removed. Following a dispute regarding the impact of the bridge landing on Stord, SBT proposed building a culvert on Digernes as a compromise to avoid developing a new plan which could have postponed the project several years. On 11 June 1996, Parliament decided with 144 against 20 votes to build the Triangle Link. The original name proposed for the tunnel was Sunnhordlandsporten ("The Portal to Sunnhordland"), but this was changed to Bømlafjordtunnelen.

== Construction ==
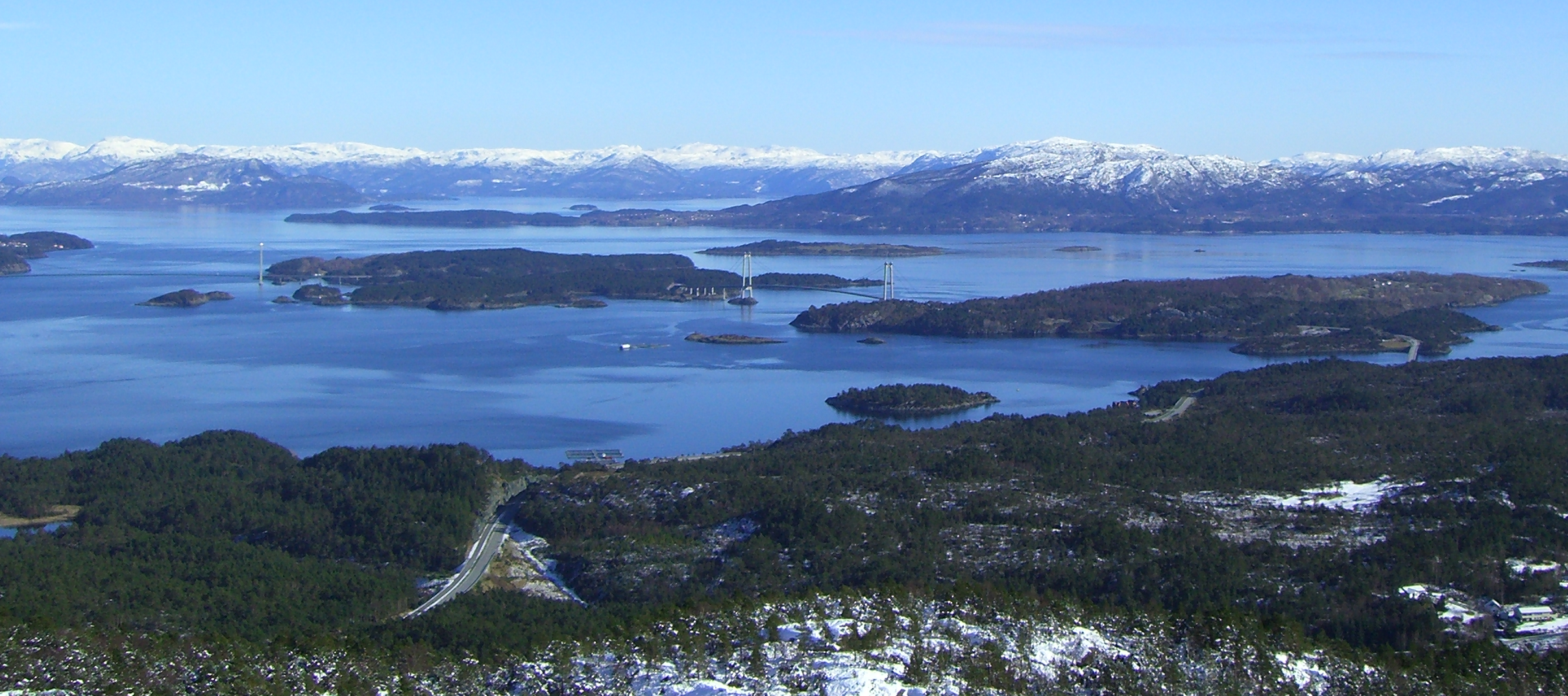
Overview of the Triangle Link area as seen from Bømlo

Geological sampling was undertaken by the Norwegian Geological Survey and Grøner, and included both core samples and reflection seismology. Late core samples showed that the tunnel would have to be located 30 meters (98 ft) further down than originally planned to avoid deposits. The tunnel construction was awarded to two companies: the contract starting from Dalshovda in Sveio and was worked by the Public Roads Administration, while the tunneling from Føyno was worked by NCC. Both used the drilling and blasting method. NCC was awarded the contract after bidding NOK 175 million for the job. Construction from Sveio started on 16 September 1997 and from Føyno on 6 March 1998. In all, 625,000 cubic meters (22,100,000 cu ft) of earthwork was extracted. The earthwork from the Føyno side was transported by barge to Austevoll Municipality and used to build the Austevoll Bridge. The earthwork from the Sveio side was used to build roads and a golf course in the area. On average, the tunnel was built at a speed of 55 meters (180 ft) per week, with the record being 96.7 meters (317 ft). Between 30 and 40 people worked with the tunneling on each team. The lowest point was reached on 5 May 1999 and the breakthrough took place on 2 September 1999, five months before schedule. Construction involved injection of 282 tonnes (278 long tons; 311 short tons) and spraying of 14,900 cubic meters (530,000 cu ft) of gunite.

The tunnel was budgeted to cost NOK 496 million, but ended up costing NOK 487 million. It opened along with the Stord Bridge on 27 December 2000. Six hours before the opening, the bottom of the tunnel was used for a wedding. The toll company held a course for people with fear of tunnels to master their fears, with 60 people participating. The official opening took place on 30 April 2001. When it opened, it was the longest and second-deepest subsea tunnel in Europe and Norway, after the Hitra Tunnel.

== Specifications ==
Map of the Triangle Link

The Bømlafjord Tunnel is 7,860 meters (25,790 ft) long and crosses Bømlafjorden as part of European Route E39. To the southeast, the tunnel begins at Dalshovda in Sveio. It runs under Bømlafjord, then passes below the island of Otterøya and continues under the fjord again before ending on the island of Føyno. The tunnel is 11 meters (36 ft) wide and has three lanes. As the tunnel has a significant slope, two lanes runs uphill and one runs downhill. It has a height of 4.7 meters (15 ft) and has its deepest point at 260.4 meters (854 ft) below mean sea level. Safety measures include fire extinguishers, emergency telephones and break-down pullovers every 250 meters (820 ft). There are turning points for trucks every 1,500 meters (4,900 ft) and lights and barriers at the entrances to notify drivers if the tunnel is closed. It features radio coverage and a system to register the position and key information about all vehicles in the tunnel. All the emergency equipment is connected to the Public Roads Administrations centre in Bergen. The tunnel has mobile telephone coverage. In 2016, the tunnel had an average 4,974 vehicles per day.

The Triangle Link was partially financed with tolls, with toll collection located at Føyno. It was constructed as a grade-separated intersection, such that any car passes through the toll plaza once. As of 2011, the fees were NOK 85 for cars and NOK 270 for trucks. Frequent travellers could prepay for at least 40 passings to the toll company, and receive a 40 percent discount. The tolls were removed in April 2013 since the tunnel got paid off.

The tunnel runs through an area with complex and varied geology. It runs through two rock complexes, the Halsnøy Basement Rock on the Sveio side, and Hardangerfjord Cover Complex on the Stord side. Both were created during the creation of the Caledonian orogeny 500 million years ago. The Halsnøy Basement Rock consists of Precambrian rock with elements of gneiss of both sedimentary and magmatic origin. They range between granite gneiss to mylonite. In the area between the two complexes, there is some amount of gabbro. At the lowest point, the tunnel runs through a section of phyllite, which continues to be the dominant species until the tunnel reaches Otterøya. Below the island the tunnel reaches a section of greenstone, before it rises again through more phyllite.
