= Otterøya (Vestland) =

Island in Vestland, Norway

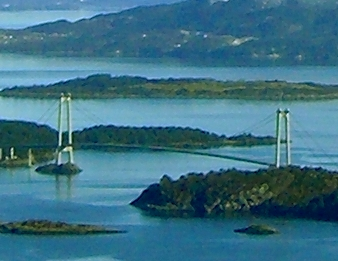
- View of the island (top-center of the photo)
- Interactive map of the island
- Other names: Otrøyna / Otrøya / Otterøy

Geography
- Location: Vestland, Norway
- Coordinates: 59.72508°N 5.43034°E
- Area: 0.45 km^{2} (0.17 sq mi)
- Length: 975 m (3199 ft)
- Width: 880 m (2890 ft)
- Highest elevation: 27 m (89 ft)

Administration
- Norway
- County: Vestland
- Municipality: Bømlo Municipality

Demographics
- Population: 0

Otterøya is an unpopulated island in Bømlo Municipality in Vestland county, Norway. The 0.45-square-kilometre (110-acre) island lies in the Bømlafjorden, southeast of the islands of Føyno, Nautøya, and Spyssøya. The southern part of the island is a nature reserve. The Bømlafjord Tunnel runs underneath the island.

== See also ==
- List of islands of Norway
