= Stokksund (Vestland) =

Strait in Vestland, Norway

- Stokksundet
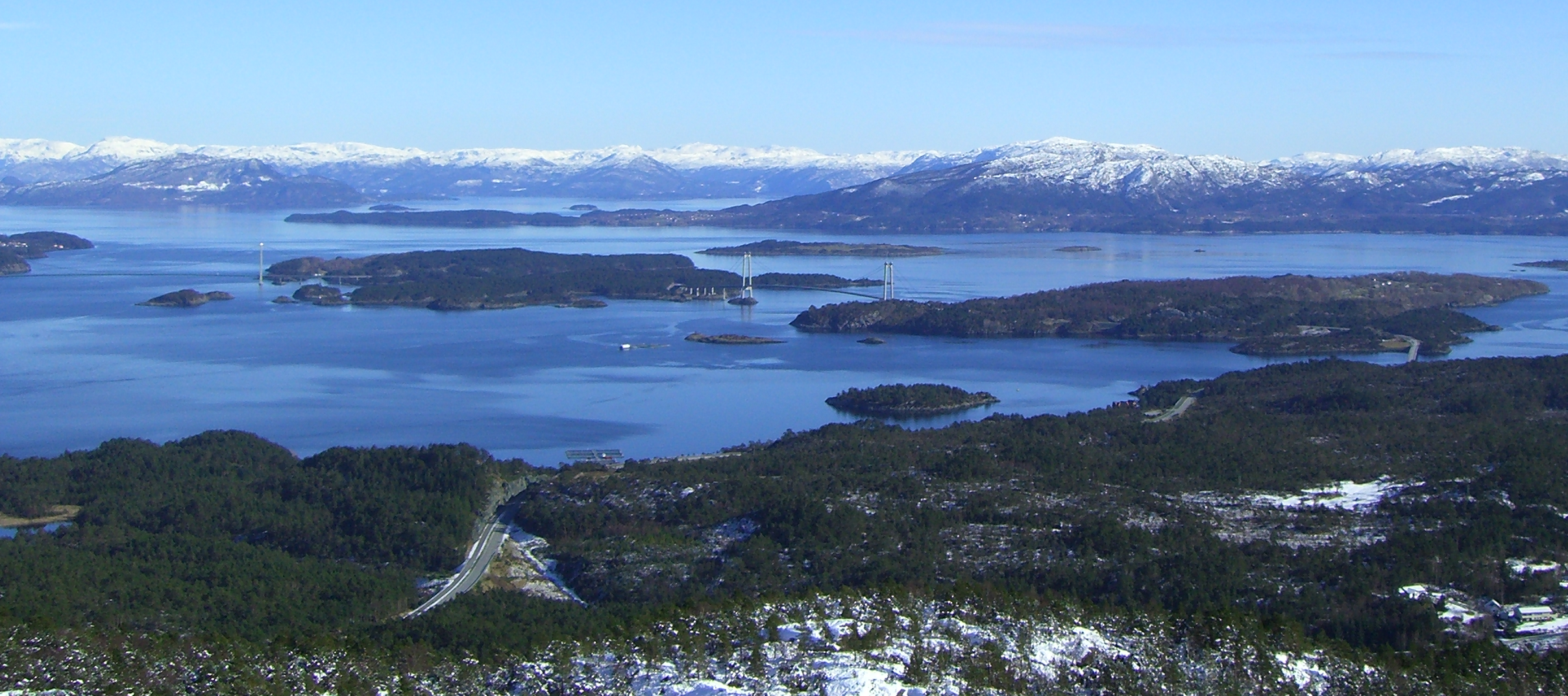
- View of the Stokksund on the left
- Interactive map of the fjord
- Location: Vestland county, Norway
- Coordinates: 59.8077°N 5.32062°E
- Type: Sound
- Basin countries: Norway
- Max. length: 15 kilometres (9.3 mi)
- Settlements: Sagvåg, Rubbestadneset

Stokksund is a sound between the islands of Stord and Bømlo in Vestland county, Norway. It is about 15 kilometres (9.3 mi) long and it runs from the village of Koløyhamn in Fitjar Municipality in the north then heads south to the islands of Føyno and Nautøya (in Stord Municipality) and Spyssøya (in Bømlo Municipality). The Digernessundet is a small strait on the south end that connects the Stokksundet to the vast Hardangerfjorden. On the southern end of the strait, the Stord Bridge and Bømla Bridge cross the sound, connecting the islands of Stord and Bømlo to the Bømlafjord Tunnel as part of the Triangle Link which connects both islands to the mainland.
