= Framnes =

Framnes may refer to:

- Sigbjørn Framnes (born 1965), Norwegian politician
- Framnes Mountains, a group of Antarctic mountain ranges in Mac. Robertson Land, to the south of the Mawson Coast
- Cape Framnes, a cape which forms the northeast end of Jason Peninsula
