= Operation Cartoon =

1943 British Commando operation in Norway

- Part of World War II
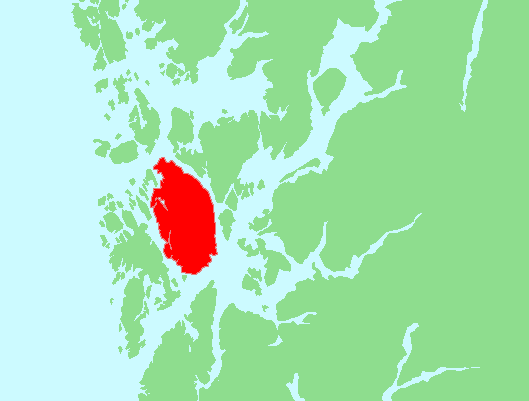
- Stord island in the North Sea.
Date	23/24 January 1943
Location	Stord Island, Norway, North Sea 59°48′29″N 05°27′59″E
Result	Allied victory

Belligerents
United Kingdom; Norway	Germany

Strength
Land: 63 British commandos and 10 Norwegian commandos Sea: 7 motor torpedo boats	

Casualties and losses
1 killed, 10 wounded	3 captured
- German steamer sunk during the operation.

Operation Cartoon was a British Commando raid on the island of Stord near Leirvik in Vestland, Norway on the night of 23/24 January 1943. The operation was carried out by 53 men of No. 12 Commando supported by ten men from the Norwegian 10 (IA) Commando (Captain Harald Risnes). RAF Coastal Command co-operated with the Commandos, with aircraft from 18 Group.

== Operation ==
The raiders were transported to Stord by seven Royal Norwegian Navy motor torpedo boats of the 30th MTB Flotilla. Their objective was the destruction of the Pyrite mine on the island. On arrival, half the commandos were landed at Sagvåg quay and engaged German defensive positions, while the remainder were landed on the other side of the bay. The commandos carrying 50 lb (23 kg) of explosives reached the Pyrite mine which was 2 mi (3.2 km) away after twenty-five minutes. The explosive charges put the Stordø Kisgruber mine out of action for a year. As they departed, the torpedo boats attacked a German steamer which they left sinking. The commandos took three German prisoners, papers and equipment, for the loss of one commando killed, two commandos and eight sailors injured.

== Aftermath ==
Admiral John Tovey said afterwards that

...the whole operation was as creditable as it was enjoyable to the Norwegians who carried it out.

and later that month the Norwegians sailed in a whaler to ambush a convoy at Lister light and bring it to Britain. The plan failed and the Norwegians stayed in Norway and at the end of February, hijacked some small vessels and fishing boats to Scotland. The Norwegian MTBs sank two ships in the Norwegian Leads in the middle of March
