= Stordø Kisgruber =

Norwegian mining company

Coordinates: 59°47′30″N 5°24′00″E

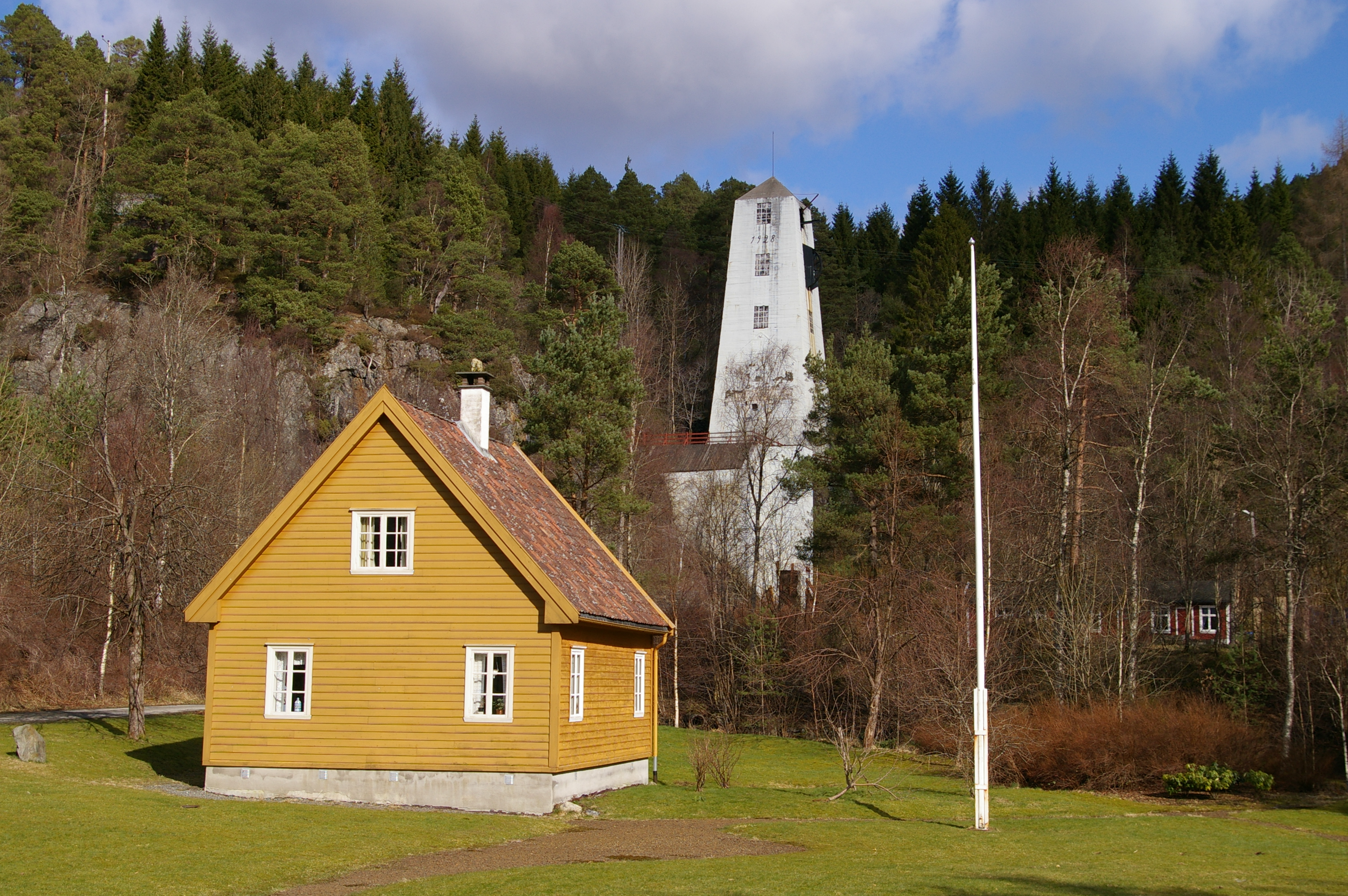
The elevator tower at Stordø Kisgruber at Litlabø, Stord

Stordø Kisgruber was a Norwegian mining company which operated the pyrite mines in Litlabø in Stord Municipality in Hordaland, Norway.

Mining for pyrite at Litlabø had first been established in 1865. Stordø Kisgruber A/S was established in 1907 and maintained mining operations which ended in 1968. A total of about eight million tons of ore was won during the operation of the mine. Under the elevator tower is the main mine shaft which went straight down about 750 meters deep. Altogether there are 80 km of shafts into the mountain. A railway line operated between Litlabø and the quays at Sagvåg.

During the Nazi occupation of Norway, the mines delivered pyrite to Germany for use by the country's war industry. During 1941, this amounted to 9,000 tons per month. In January 1943 the mines were targeted by the British Commando raid Operation Cartoon. Several dynamite charges were set off in various buildings at Litlabø. The hoist machine, the compressor house and the locomotive engine shed, among others, were blown up.

The Mining Museum at Litlabø (Norwegian: Gruvemuseet på Litlabø) was later established to commemorate the mines and the accompanying society.
