= Grov, Stord =

Village in Stord Municipality, Norway

Grov
- Village
- Interactive map of Grov
- Coordinates: 59.8438°N 5.52689°E
- Country: Norway
- Region: Western Norway
- County: Vestland
- District: Sunnhordland
- Municipality: Stord Municipality
- Elevation: 60 m (200 ft)
- Time zone: UTC+01:00 (CET)
  - Summer (DST): UTC+02:00 (CEST)
- Post Code: 5414 Stord

Grov is a village in Stord Municipality in Vestland county, Norway. The village is located on the island of Stord, about a 7-minute drive north of the town of Leirvik. Grov lies along the European route E39 highway and the Langenuen strait, overlooking the island of Huglo across the strait. Grov is known for its fantastic natural surroundings and peaceful life by the sea.
