= Grov =

Grov may refer to:

== Places ==
- Grov, Kinn, a village in Kinn municipality in Vestland county, Norway
- Grov, Stord, a village in Stord municipality in Vestland county, Norway
- Grov, Troms, a village in Tjeldsund municipality, Troms county, Norway

== People ==
- Martinus Grov, a Norwegian archer
