= Litlabø =

Village in Stord Municipality, Norway

- Village
- Interactive map of Litlabø
- Coordinates: 59.79021°N 5.42046°E
- Country: Norway
- Region: Western Norway
- County: Vestland
- District: Sunnhordland
- Municipality: Stord Municipality
- Elevation: 23 m (75 ft)
- Time zone: UTC+01:00 (CET)
  - Summer (DST): UTC+02:00 (CEST)
- Post Code: 5410 Sagvåg

Litlabø is a village and former mining community in Stord Municipality in Vestland county, Norway. It is located on the island of Stord at the northern side of the lake of Storavatnet, just northeast of the village of Sagvåg and about 5 kilometres (3.1 mi) northwest of the town of Leirvik. The village had about 450 inhabitants as of 2001. Litlabø was the location for the pyrite mines of Stordø Kisgruber, which operated from 1907 to 1968.
