= Ragnar Rommetveit =

Norwegian psychologist

- Born: July 11, 1924; Stord Municipality, Norway
- Died: June 11, 2017 (aged 92)
- Education: University of Oslo
- Occupation: Psychologist

Ragnar Rommetveit (11 July 1924 – 11 June 2017) was a Norwegian psychologist.

He was born in Stord Municipality. Rommetveit graduated as dr.philos. from the University of Oslo in 1953, with the thesis Social Norms and Roles. He was appointed professor at the University of Oslo from 1959 to 1994. His textbook Språk, Tanke og Kommunikasjon from 1970 has been used for decades in Norway as an introductory book in language psychology. He is a fellow of the Norwegian Academy of Science and Letters.
