= Jan Kåre Hystad =

Norwegian jazz musician (born 1955)

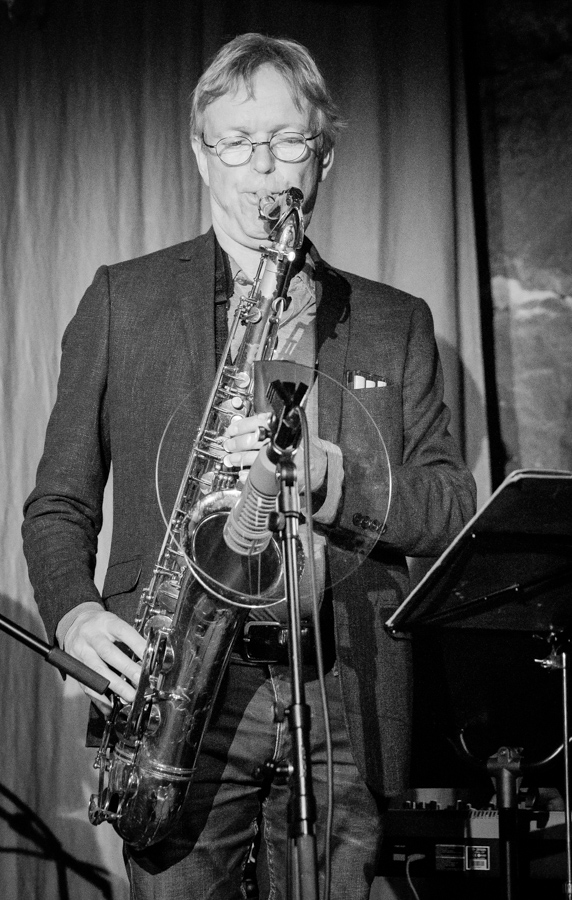
- Hystad in 2017

Background information
- Also known as: Hysen
- Born: 9 July 1955 (age 71); Stord Municipality, Norway
- Genre: Jazz
- Occupations: Musician, band leader, composer
- Instruments: Saxophones, clarinet, flute

Jan Kåre "Hysen" Hystad (born 9 July 1955) is a Norwegian jazz musician (saxophone, clarinet, flute), and the older brother of jazz saxophonist Ole Jacob Hystad. He is known as leader of his own Quartet and as part of the Bergen Big Band with cooperations with Teje Rypdal, John Surman and Karin Krogh.

== Career ==
Hystad was born in Stord Municipality and was classically educated at Griegakademiet, University of Bergen. Since 1978 he has been a resident of Bergen where he has been freelance musician, he led his own ensembles, as well as being involved as musical director and musician at Den Nationale Scene and in Bergen Big Band. Han ga ut Cafè Hysen Noir (2000), with contributions by Guttorm Guttormsen, Harald Dahlstrøm/Håkon Berge/Atle Halstensen piano, Yngve Moe/Sveinung Sand bass, Tarald Tvedten trommer, Erlend Fauske gitar. He conduct his own Jan Kåre Hystad Quartet including Dag Arnesen (piano), Frank Jakobsen (drums) and Sigurd Ulveseth (bass). They released the album Vargtime – Varg Veum's favoritter (2002), which was launched at the same time as Varg Veum's 60 years anniversary, and the publication of the book Som i et speil (2002) by Gunnar Staalesen. The production Vargtime toured thereon Norwegian as well as Danish jazz scenes, "Kongsberg Krimfestival" (2005) and Kongsberg Jazzfestival (2006). The follow-up Vargtime 2 – four cousins (2006), with musicians Ole Jacob Hystad, Tor Yttredal and Gunnar Onarheim (saxophone), as well as Heidi Torsvik and Oddbjørn Hanto (vocals), was released simultaneously as Staalesen's Dødens drabanter (2006). Otherwise, he has collaborated on albums with Ole Amund Gjersvik and his broren Ole Jacob Hystad.

The Hystad brothers toured US and Canada with Terje Rypdal's Crime Scene within Bergen Big Band and joined by Rypdal's Skywards, the band. They will wisit the Vancouver Jazz Festival and the Montreal Jazz Festival. The latter ifestival is the world's largest of its kind.

== Discography ==
=== Solo albums ===
- 2000* Café Hysen Noir (Acoustic Records)

=== As band leader ===
- 1998: Milonga Triste (Acoustic Records), quartet with Morten Færestrand, Ole Amund Gjersvik & Stein Inge Brækhus
- 1999: Design by Sound (Acoustic Records), trio with Stein Inge Brækhus & Ole Amund Gjersvik
- 2002: Vargtime – Varg Veum's favoritter (Gemini Records), as J.K.H. Quartet
- 2006: Vargtime 2 – Four Cousins (Gemini Records), as J.K.H. Quartet
- 2009: Vargtime 3 – Something Good (Acoustic Records), as J.K.H. Quartet

=== Collaborative works ===
With Bergen Blues Band

- 1980: Bergen Blues Band (Harvest, EMI Norge)

With Jan Eggum

- 1984: Alarmen Går (Karussell)

With Knut Skodvin

- 1989: Gynt (Gynt), with Harald Dahlstrøm, Ole Thomsen & Tone Ljøkelsøy

With Ole Amund Gjersvik

- 1990: A Voice from the Past (Acoustic Records)

With Knut Vaage & Ragnvald Vaage

- 1993: Eg strøyer mine songar ut (Albedo), feat. Linda Øvrebø

With Knut Vaage & Ragnvald Vaage

- 1994: Jeg – En Beach Boy (Albedo), with Trygve Thue

With Kaizers Orchestra

- 2001: Ompa Til Du Dør (Acoustic Records)

With Britt-Synnøve Johansen

- 2002: Mot Himmlen I Paris – Piaf På Norsk (West Audio Production)
- 2010: Skyt Meg Med Tre Roser – Tango På Norsk (Adelante Records)

Within Bergen Big Band

- 2003: Adventures in European New Jazz And Improvised Music (Europe Jazz Oddysey), with Mathias Rüegg "Art & Fun" on compilation with various artists
- 2005: Seagull (Grappa Music), feat. Karin Krog conducted by John Surman recorded at the Nattjazz Festival, Bergen 2004
- 2007: Meditations on Coltrane (Grappa Music), with The Core
- 2008: Som den gyldne sol frembryter (Grappa Music)
- 2010: Crime Scene (ECM Records), with Terje Rypdal recorded at the Nattjazz Festival, Bergen 2009
