= Liv Kari Eskeland =

Norwegian politician (born 1965)

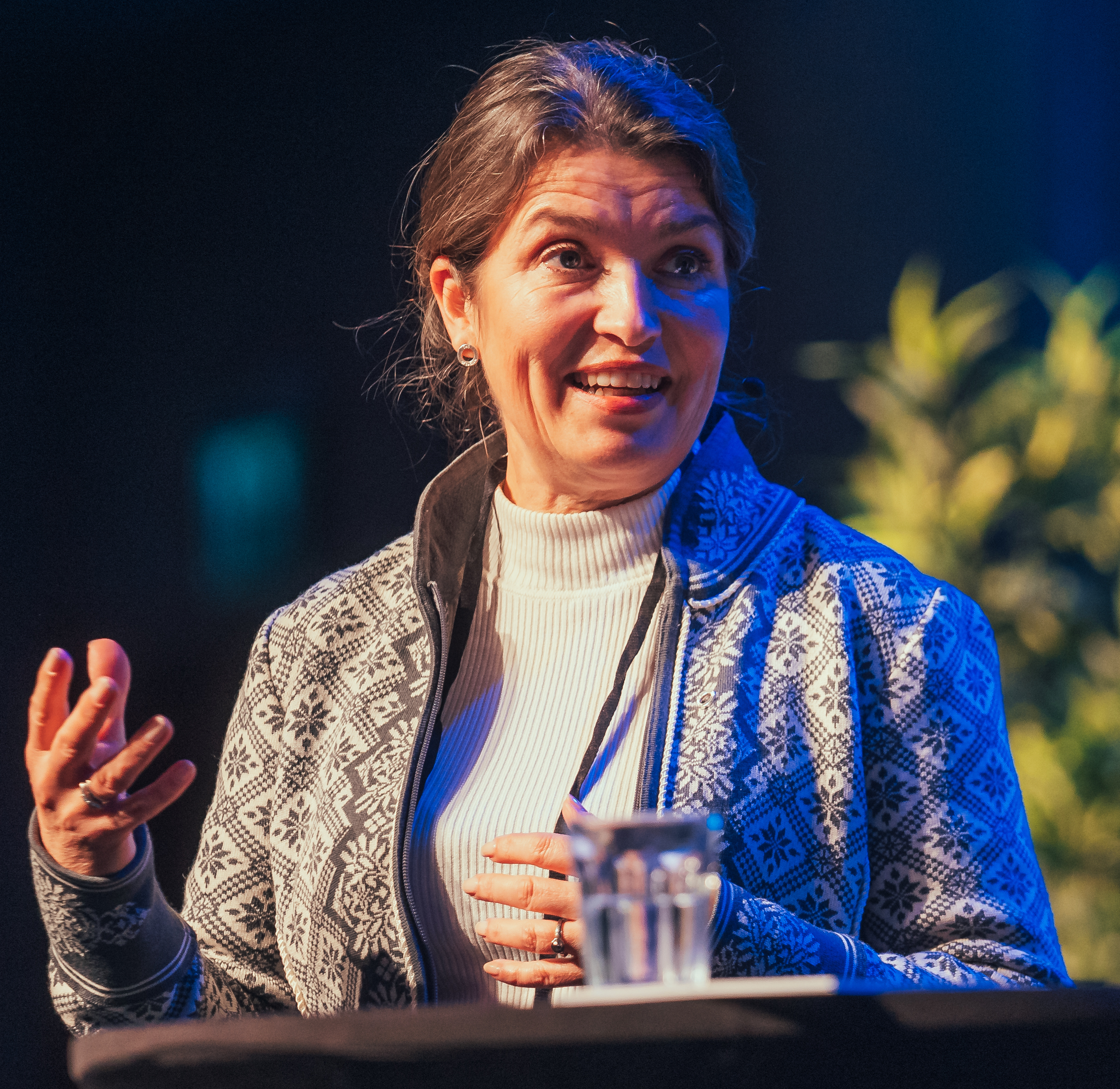
- Born: 21 May 1965 (age 61)
- Education: Norwegian University of Science and Technology
- Occupation: Politician
- Employer: Architect
- Political party: Conservative Party

Liv Kari Eskeland (born 21 May 1965) is a Norwegian politician for the Conservative Party. She served as mayor of Stord Municipality from 2007 to 2015, met regularly as deputy member of the Storting from 2017 to 2021, and was elected ordinary representative to the Storting from 2021.

== Early and personal life ==
Eskeland was born on 21 May 1965, a daughter of Leiv Eskeland and Marie-Anne Eskeland. She was educated as architect from the Norwegian University of Science and Technology.

== Political career ==
=== Local politics ===
Eskeland was a member of the municipal council of Stord Municipality, and served as mayor of Stord Municipality from 2007 to 2015.

=== Parliament ===
She was elected deputy representative to the Storting for the periods 2009–2013, 2013–2017, and 2017–2021 for the Conservative Party. She replaced Erna Solberg at the Storting from October 2017 to 2021, and was a member of the Standing Committee on Energy and the Environment from 2017 to 2021.

She was elected ordinary member to the Storting for the period 2021–2025, and was a member of the Standing Committee on Transport and Communications from 2021.

=== Other ===
Eskeland chaired Kommunal Landspensjonskasse (KLP) from 2014 to 2017, and was a board member of the Language Council of Norway from 2016 to 2018.
