= Nysæter Church =

Church in Vestland, Norway

- Nysæter kyrkje
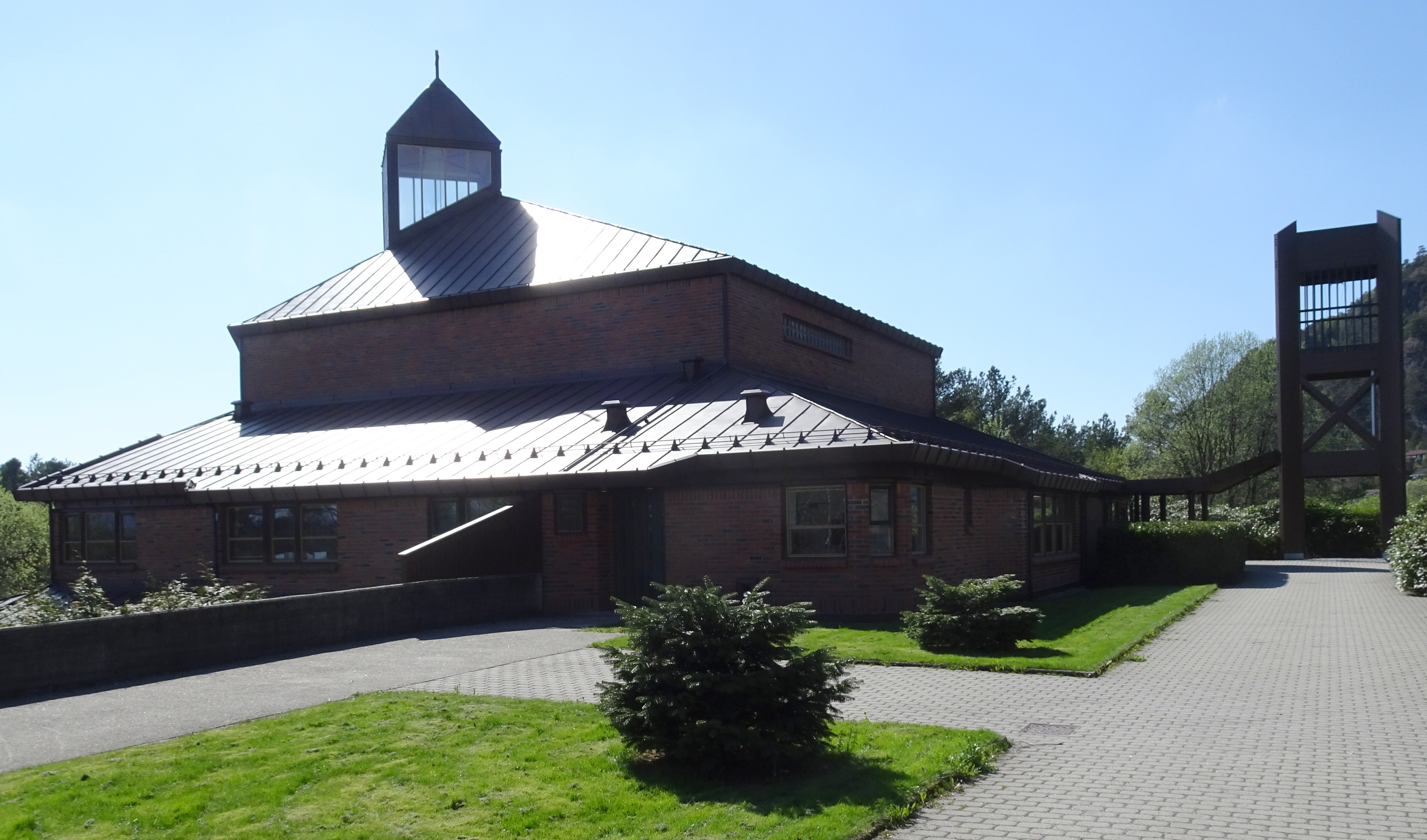
- View of the church
- Nysæter Church
- 59°46′56″N 5°23′53″E
- Location: Stord Municipality, Vestland
- Country: Norway
- Denomination: Church of Norway
- Churchmanship: Evangelical Lutheran

History
- Status: Parish church
- Founded: 1991
- Consecrated: January 1992

Architecture
- Functional status: Active
- Architect: Colin Ansbach
- Architectural type: Fan-shaped
- Completed: 1991 (35 years ago)

Specifications
- Capacity: 350
- Materials: Brick

Administration
- Diocese: Bjørgvin bispedømme
- Deanery: Sunnhordland prosti
- Parish: Nysæter
- Norwegian Cultural Heritage Site
- Type: Church
- Status: Not protected
- ID: 280992

Nysæter Church (Norwegian: Nysæter kyrkje) is a parish church of the Church of Norway in Stord Municipality in Vestland county, Norway. It is located in the village of Sagvåg on the southwestern coast of the island of Stord. It is the church for the Nysæter parish which is part of the Sunnhordland prosti (deanery) in the Diocese of Bjørgvin. The red brick church was built in a fan-shaped design in 1991 using plans drawn up by the architect Colin Ansbach. The church seats about 350 people.

== History ==
Planning for a new church in Sagvåg began during the late 1980s. Colin Ansbach was hired to design a new brick church. Construction took place during 1990-1991, finishing up in the fall of 1991. The church was consecrated in January 1992.

== See also ==
- List of churches in Bjørgvin
