= Spyssøya =

Island in Vestland, Norway

Spyssøya Spyssøy Spissøya
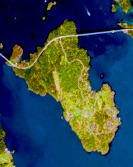
- View of the island from space
- Interactive map of the island

Geography
- Location: Vestland, Norway
- Coordinates: 59.73105°N 5.3665°E
- Area: 1.5 km^{2} (0.58 sq mi)
- Length: 2.2 km (1.37 mi)
- Width: 1.2 km (0.75 mi)
- Coastline: 6.5 km (4.04 mi)
- Highest elevation: 68 m (223 ft)

Administration
- Norway
- County: Vestland
- Municipality: Bømlo Municipality

Spyssøya is an island in Bømlo Municipality in Vestland county, Norway. The 1.5-square-kilometre (0.58 sq mi) island lies at the confluence of the Stokksund strait and the Hardangerfjorden. he island of Bømlo lies to the northwest, the island of Moster lies to the southwest, the island of Otterøya lies to the southeast, and the island of Nautøya lies to the northeast. Spyssøya is connected to the island of Bømlo by the Spissøy Bridge and to the island of Nautøya via the Bømla Bridge. Permanent inhabitants on the small island were few until the bridges were built. Since that time, the island's population has been increasing.

== See also ==
- List of islands of Norway
