= Olaf Kullmann =

Norwegian naval officer and peace activist

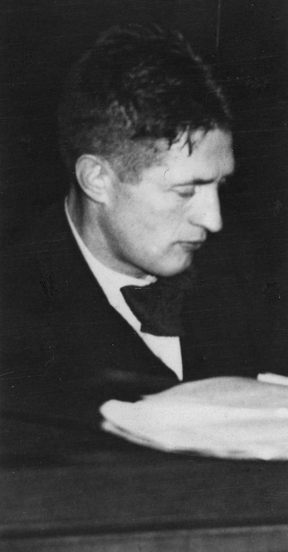
Olaf Kullmann

Olaf Bryn Kullmann (2 July 1892 – 9 July 1942) was a Norwegian naval officer and peace activist.

== Early life and career ==
He was born in Stord Municipality in the county of Hordaland, Norway. He was a son of vicar and school manager Jakob Kullmann (1852–1910) and Ingeleiv Kristine Mæland (1864–1951). He studied at the Norwegian Naval Academy, and served on a torpedo boat with the rank of Premier Lieutenant from 1916. He later studied law, graduated with the Candidate of Law degree in 1923, served as a deputy in Vestfold, and from 1925 was an attorney in Bergen. From 1925 to 1930 he worked in Oslo. He then returned to the navy, from 1929 with the rank of Captain. He had responsibility for the torpedo battery at Oscarsborg Fortress.

== Political turnaround ==
Kullmann eventually turned against the ideas of the existing military. He had been an adviser for the Norwegian Labour Party when in 1932 it proposed to replace the entire armed forces with a semi-armed "civil guard", and was a member of the party for some time. In the summer of 1932 he participated on an anti-war congress in Amsterdam. For his agitation, Kullmann was suspended and legally relieved of his naval engagements. The campaign was spearheaded by Minister of Defence Vidkun Quisling (later head of government of Nazi German occupied Norway), and a support campaign for Kullmann was spearheaded by the Labour Party. Kullmann also formed a short-lived Peace Party.

The latter half of the 1930s started with the Second Italo-Abyssinian War, which Kullmann protested. For this he was expelled from Italy, where he had travelled in 1935. He issued the book Hjelp din bror, etioperen ("Help Your Brother, the Ethiopian") in Norway in 1938. In 1940, Norway was invaded by Germany, involving Norway in World War II. Kullmann subsequently bicycled around Norway to agitate for pacifism.

== Incarceration and death ==
The German occupiers demanded his signature on a declaration that he would forever cease his pacifist agitation; Kullmann refused and was arrested in June 1941. He was imprisoned in Møllergata 19 and in Grini concentration camp, then sent to Sachsenhausen concentration camp on 3 April 1942, where he died in July. He was memorialized in a poem by fellow Sachsenhausen inmate Arnulf Øverland in the 1956 poetry collection Sverdet bak døren.

Kullmann was a granduncle of later Norwegian Nobel Committee member Kaci Kullmann Five.

== Selected works ==
- Fred eller krig for Norden? (1935)
- Europe Awake (1936)
- Hjelp din bror, etioperen (1938)
- Folkereisning mot krig (1939)
- Lovsangen (1940)

== Other sources ==
- Gjelsvik, Tore (1979) Norwegian Resistance: 1940–1945 (Univ of Toronto Press) ISBN 978-0-7735-0507-0
- Ottosen, Kristian (1990) Liv og død : historien om Sachsenhausen-fangene (Oslo: Aschehoug) ISBN 82-03-16484-6
