= Ole Jacob Hystad =

Norwegian jazz musician (born 1960)

- Born: 20 July 1960 (age 66); Stord Municipality, Norway
- Genres: Jazz
- Occupations: Musician, band leader, composer
- Instruments: Saxophone, clarinet

Ole Jacob Hystad (born 20 July 1960) is a Norwegian jazz musician (tenor saxophone and clarinet). He was born in Stord Municipality, and is the brother of jazz saxophonist Jan Kåre Hystad.

== Career ==
Hystad is leader of his own Ole Jacob Hystad Quartet, originally comprising additional Sigurd Ulveseth (bass), Ben Besiakov, (piano), and Stein Inge Brækhus (drums). Later the quartet substituted Brækhus with Alex Riel for their second album Tune in – take out (2002), and has lately consisted of Dag Arnesen (piano), Sigurd Ulveseth (bass) and Frank Jakobsen (drums). He also played in Bakeriet Bluesband, and on releases by the musicians Atle Hansen, Lars Erik Drevvatne and Ole Amund Gjersvik, and been at the forefront of Stord Jazz and Blues Festival.

The Hystad brothers toured US and Canada with Terje Rypdal's Crime Scene as part of Bergen Big Band.

== Discography ==
=== As band leader ===
- 1998: Touch of time (Taurus Records), as O.J.H. Quartet (Ben Besiakov, Sigurd Ulveseth & Stein Inge Brækhus)
- 2002: Tune in – take out (Taurus Records), as O.J.H. Quartet (Ben Besiakov, Sigurd Ulveseth & Alex Riel) playing music inspired by Dexter Gordon

=== Collaborative works ===
With Ole Amund Gjersvik

- 1990: A Voice from the Past (Acoustic Records)
- 1995: Around the Fountain (Acoustic Records)

With Britt-Synnøve Johansen

- 2002: Mot Himmlen I Paris – Piaf På Norsk (West Audio Production)

Within Bergen Big Band

- 2003: Adventures in European New Jazz And Improvised Music (Europe Jazz Oddysey), with Mathias Rüegg "Art & Fun" on compilation with various artists
- 2005: Seagull (Grappa Music), feat. Karin Krog conducted by John Surman recorded at the Nattjazz Festival, Bergen 2004
- 2007: Meditations on Coltrane (Grappa Music), with The Core
- 2008: Som den gyldne sol frembryter (Grappa Music)
- 2010: Crime Scene (ECM Records), with Terje Rypdal recorded at the Nattjazz Festival, Bergen 2009

With Jan Kåre Hystad

- 2006: Vargtime 2 – Four Cousins (Gemini Records)

With Christian Welde

- 2009: Skywatching (WeldeMedia), including Jan Ingvar Toft, Mike McGurk and Roger Pedersen

With Organ Jam

- 2013: Organics (Normann Records)
