= Sigurd Ulveseth =

Norwegian jazz musician and orchestra leader (born 1953)

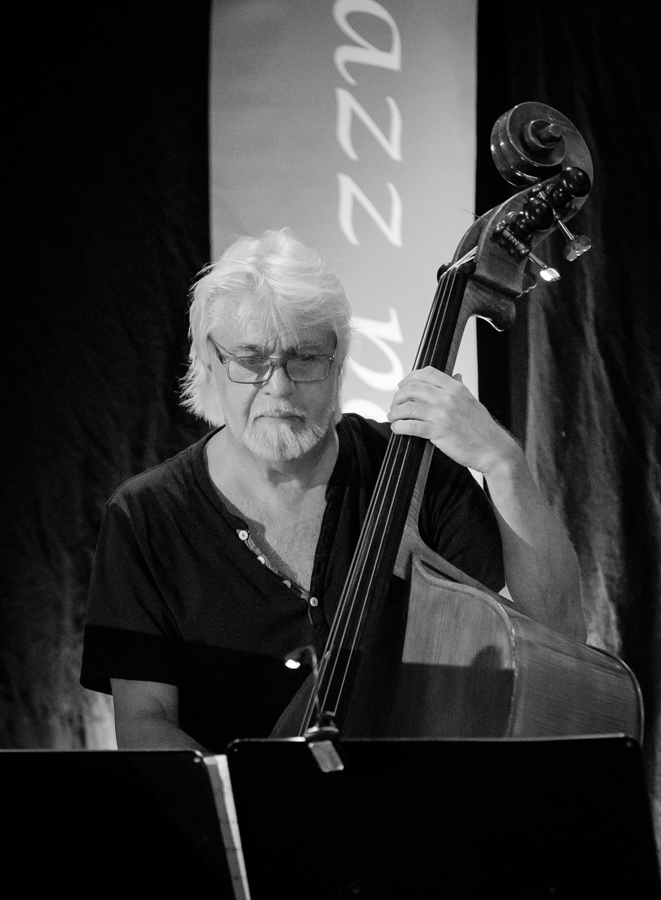
- Ulveseth in 2017

Background information
- Born: 13 July 1953 (age 73); Bergen, Hordaland
- Origin: Norway
- Genres: Jazz
- Occupations: Musician, composer
- Instrument: Upright bass
- Website: www.usf.no/no/program/2014/07/sigurd-ulveseth-kvartett

Sigurd Ulveseth (born 13 July 1953) is a Norwegian jazz musician (Upright bass) and Orchestra leader, known from a number of album releases.

== Career ==
Ulveseth was born in Bergen. With his own quartet, he has released three albums. The band consists of Adam Nussbaum (drums), Knut Riisnæs (saxophone), and Dag Arnesen (piano). He is also part of "Marit Sandvik Band", the band "SWAP" with Jan Gunnar Hoff, "North West Quartet" with Frode Nymo among others. He has recorded with Bergen musicians Dag Arnesen, Frank Jakobsen, Tore Faye, Knut Kristiansen, Ole Jacob Hystad, Jan Kåre Hystad and Merethe Mikkelsen. Moreover, he toured Vietnam with Urban Connection.

== Honors ==
- Vossajazzprisen 1998
- The 10th Sildajazz Award 2009

== Discography ==
- 1995: To wisdom, the prize (Gemini Music)
- 1997: Infant eyes (Gemini)
- 2001: Wish I knew (Gemini)

Awards
Preceded by Frank Jakobsen	Recipient of the Vossajazzprisen; 1998	Succeeded by Helge Lilletvedt
Preceded by Olav Dale	Recipient of the Sildajazzprisen; 2009	Succeeded by Fredrik Luhr Dietrichson
