= Magne Rommetveit (philologist) =

Norwegian lexicographer

Magne Rommetveit (4 October 1918 – 6 January 2009) was a Norwegian lexicographer.

He was born in Stord Municipality. He finished his secondary education in Vossavangen in 1940 and took the cand.philol. degree in 1950. He worked as a lexicographer associated with the University of Oslo, and eventually became a docent and professor of Nynorsk philology from 1978 to 1988. He was involved in Nynorskordboka and Norsk ordbok, but his main work was the agricultural lexicon Norsk landbruksordbok. Commencing the work in 1955, it was published at Samlaget in 1978 with 80,000 entries. He later wrote the more popular book on Nynorsk synonyms, Med andre ord. Published in 1985 as a follow-up of the earlier På godt norsk, it was reissued several times.

He was a co-founder of several Nynorsk institutions in Oslo: Kringkastingsringen which fought for Nynorsk use in the NRK, where he was general manager from 1955 to 1970; the weekly newspaper Dag og Tid in 1962 for which he coined the name; and the news agency Nynorsk Pressekontor in 1969. He became an honorary member of Noregs Mållag in 1998.
