= Eldøyane =

Peninsula in Vestland, Norway

- Peninsula
- Interactive map of Eldøyane
- Coordinates: 59.75561°N 5.48776°E
- Location: Vestland, Norway
- Part of: Stord island
- Water bodies: Hardangerfjorden
- Elevation: 3 m (9.8 ft)

Eldøyane is a partially man-made former island located just outside the town of Leirvik in Stord Municipality in Vestland county, Norway. The island was connected to the larger island of Stord by land reclamation, and over the years, the former island has been flattened and expanded by land reclamation. This now makes it a peninsula jutting out into the Hardangerfjorden. Eldøyane is the location of the company Aker Stord. This makes it one of the largest industrial sites in the town of Leirvik.
