= Digernessundet =

Strait in Sunnhordland, Norway

- Interactive map of the fjord
- Location: Vestland county, Norway
- Coordinates: 59.74532°N 5.42241°E
- Type: Strait
- Basin countries: Norway
- Max. length: 3 kilometres (1.9 mi)

Digernessundet is a strait in Stord Municipality in Vestland county, Norway. The 3-kilometre (1.9 mi) long strait runs between the islands of Føyno and Stord, which connects the Stokksund to the north with the Bømlafjorden to the south. The Stord Bridge crosses the Digernessundet.
