= Sigbjørn Framnes =

Norwegian politician (born 1965)

Sigbjørn Framnes (born 20 March 1965) is a Norwegian politician for the Progress Party.

He was elected as a deputy representative to the Parliament of Norway from Hordaland for the terms 2013–2017, 2017–2021 and 2021–2025. In 2023 he became mayor of Stord Municipality, and is a member of Hordaland county council.
