= Føyno =

Island in Vestland, Norway

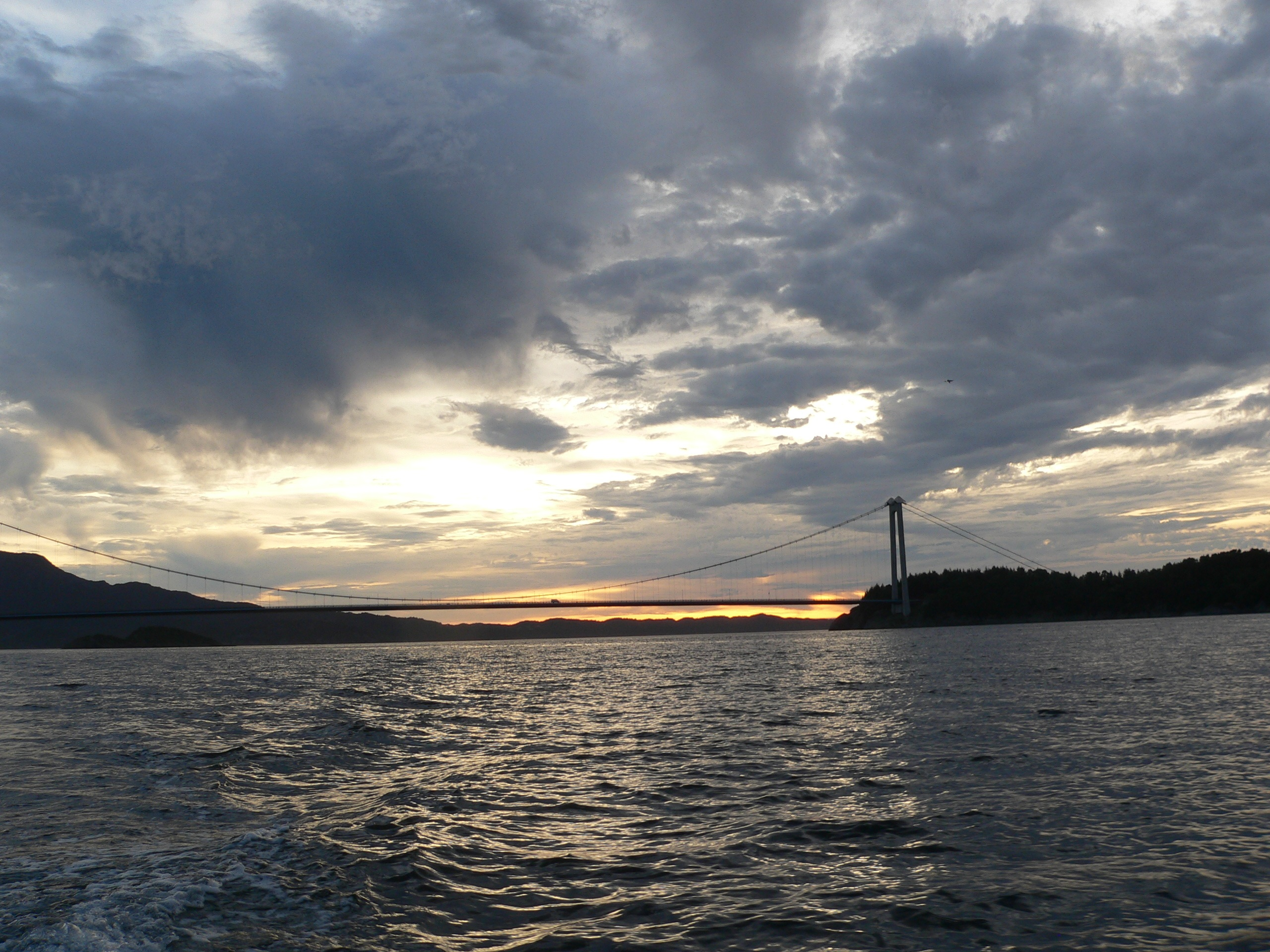
- Føyno and the bridge
- Interactive map of the island

Geography
- Coordinates: 59.73865°N 5.41016°E
- Area: 1 km^{2} (0.39 sq mi)
- Length: 1.4 km (0.87 mi)
- Width: 1.4 km (0.87 mi)
- Highest elevation: 50 m (160 ft)

Administration
- Norway
- County: Vestland
- Municipality: Stord Municipality

Føyno is an island in Stord Municipality in Vestland county, Norway. The 1-square-kilometre (0.39 sq mi) island lies southwest of the island of Stord at the southern end of the Stokksundet sound. The Digernessundet strait runs between this island and the neighboring island of Stord. Føyno had a central place in the district of Sunnhordland during the Middle Ages, and gave its name to the medieval skipreide of Føyen.

== Transportation ==
The island had no road connections to anywhere prior to December 2000 when the Triangle Link was opened. Føyno became a central piece of the bridge-tunnel connection connecting Stord Municipality and Bømlo Municipality to the mainland of Sveio Municipality to the south. The Bømlafjord Tunnel heads south from Føyno to Sveio Municipality and the Stord Bridge goes north to the island of Stord. A short bridge from Føyno to the neighboring island of Nautøya to the east connects with the large Bømla Bridge which finally connects to the island of Bømlo. The island became a central part of the European route E39 highway in Western Norway as part of the Triangle Link. The toll station for this link is located on Føyno.

== See also ==
- List of islands of Norway
