= Nautøya =

Island in Vestland, Norway

Nautøya Nautøy
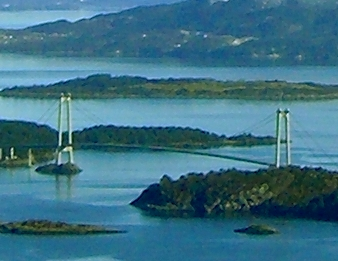
- View of the area. Nautøya is the middle one of the three small islands showing.
- Interactive map of the island

Geography
- Location: Vestland, Norway
- Coordinates: 59.73636°N 5.39491°E
- Length: 1.5 km (0.93 mi)
- Width: 850 m (2790 ft)
- Highest elevation: 39 m (128 ft)

Administration
- Norway
- County: Vestland
- Municipality: Stord Municipality

Demographics
- Population: 0

Nautøya is an unpopulated island in Stord Municipality in Vestland county, Norway. It sits at the southern end of the Stokksundet strait about 3.5 kilometres (2.2 mi) south of the village of Sagvåg. The island is connected to the nearby island of Spissøya by the Bømla Bridge and to the nearby island of Føyno via a small bridge. Country Road 542, part of the Triangle Link, runs across the island.

== See also ==
- List of islands of Norway
