= Huglo =

Island in Vestland, Norway

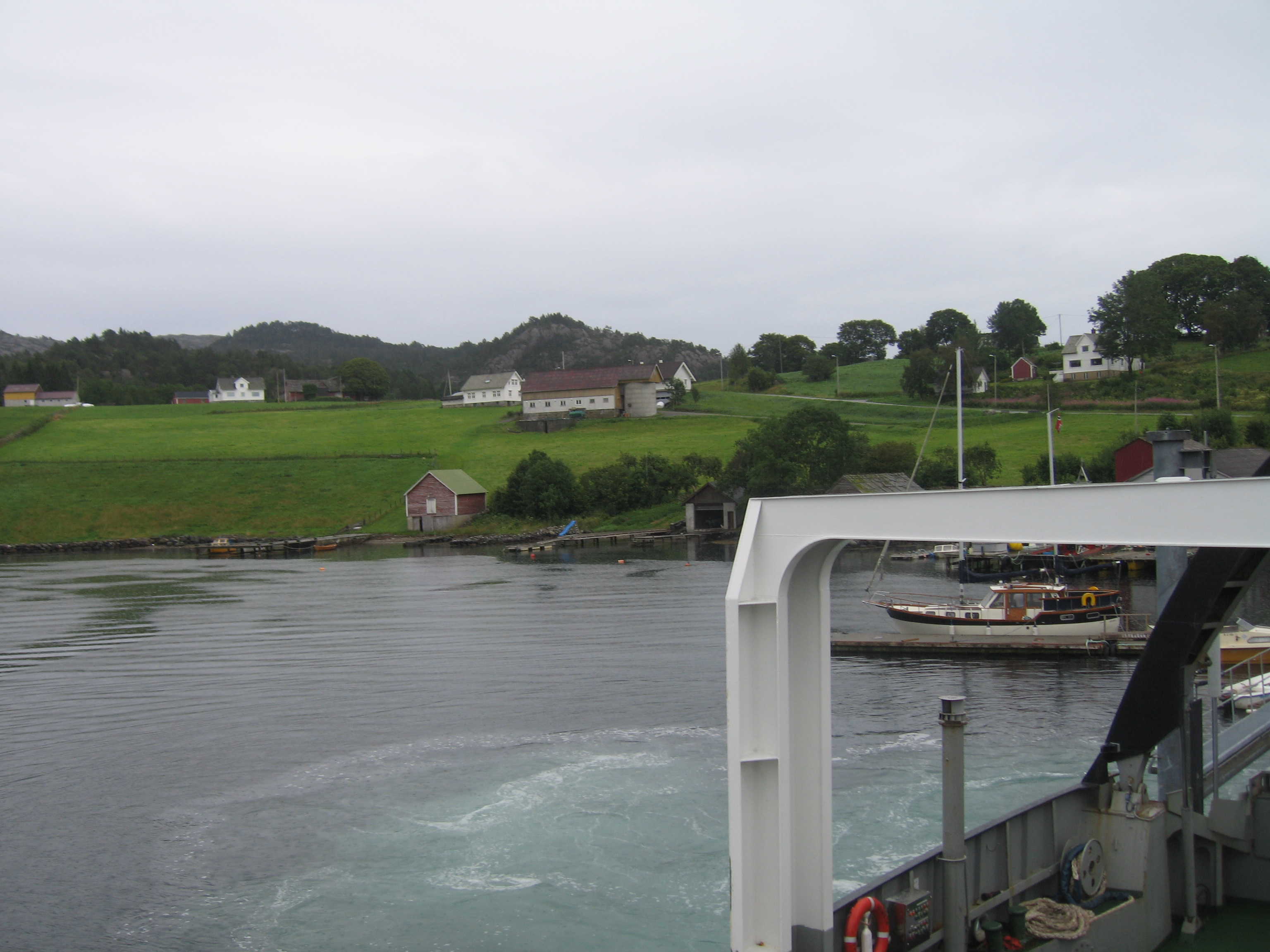
- View of Huglo, from the ferry
- Interactive map of the island

Geography
- Location: Vestland, Norway
- Coordinates: 59.8508°N 5.5850°E
- Area: 13.5 km^{2} (5.2 sq mi)
- Length: 6.9 km (4.29 mi)
- Width: 3.8 km (2.36 mi)
- Highest elevation: 218 m (715 ft)
- Highest point: Høgafjellet

Administration
- Norway
- County: Vestland
- Municipality: Stord Municipality

Demographics
- Population: 96 (2020)
- Pop. density: 7.1/km^{2} (18.4/sq mi)

Huglo is an island in Stord Municipality in Vestland county, Norway. The 13.5-square-kilometre (5.2 sq mi) island lies in the Hardangerfjorden, east of the island of Stord and south of the island of Tysnesøya. The small island of Skorpo lies immediately northeast of this island. The highest point on the rugged island is the 218-metre (715 ft) tall Høgafjellet.

The island of Huglo has no road connections off the island other than the regular car ferry routes connecting to the neighboring islands of Stord and Tysnesøya. There are about 100 inhabitants there, and the primary industries are farming, furniture making, and customized golf clubs.

== See also ==
- List of islands of Norway
