= Leirvik =

Town in Vestland, Norway

Leirvik Stord
- Town/City
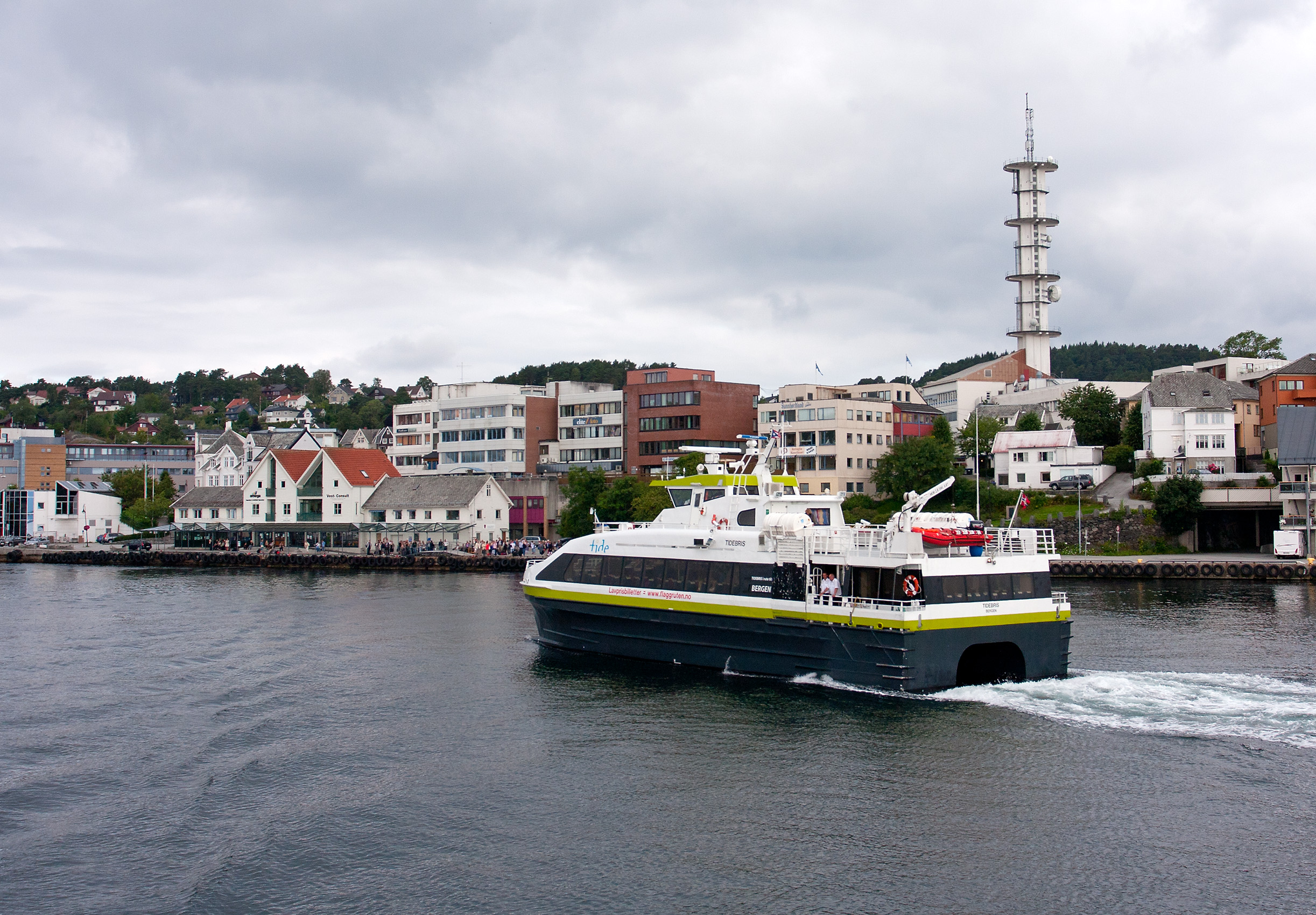
- View of the town harbour area
- Interactive map of Leirvik; Stord
- Coordinates: 59.77977°N 5.50053°E
- Country: Norway
- Region: Western Norway
- County: Vestland
- District: Sunnhordland
- Municipality: Stord Municipality
- Established as
- By (town): 1997

Area
  - Total: 10.34 km^{2} (3.99 sq mi)
- Elevation: 2 m (6.6 ft)

Population (2025)
  - Total: 14,767
  - Density: 1,428/km^{2} (3,700/sq mi)
- Demonym: Stordabu
- Time zone: UTC+01:00 (CET)
  - Summer (DST): UTC+02:00 (CEST)
- Post Code: 5417 Stord

Leirvik or Stord is a town and the administrative centre of Stord Municipality in Vestland county, Norway. The town lies along the southern coast of the large island of Stord, along the Hardangerfjorden. The town gained "town status" in 1997. The town includes the Eldøyane peninsula where the large Kværner Stord industrial area is located.

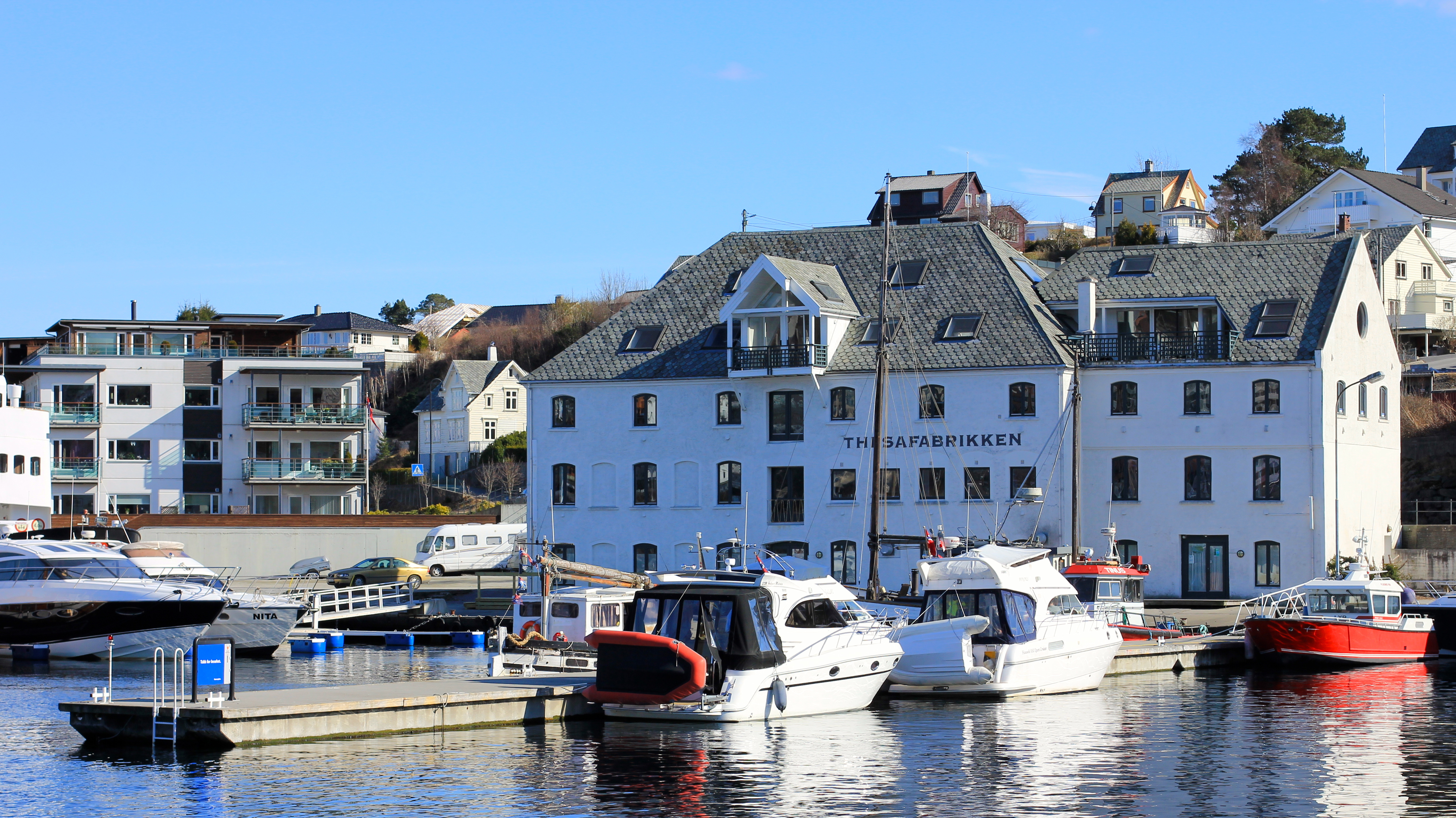
View of the harbor area of Leirvik

Leirvik is the regional centre of the traditional district of Sunnhordland, and has many public services and offices such as the Haugaland og Sunnhordland District Court and the Sunnhordland Museum, as well as many shops and restaurants. Stord Church and several schools such as Stord Upper Secondary School and Western Norway University of Applied Sciences are all located in the town.

The 10.34-square-kilometre (2,560-acre) town has a population (2025) of 14,767 and a population density of 1,428 inhabitants per square kilometre (3,700/sq mi). The entire municipality has about 18,700 residents (2019), so Leirvik has about 75% of the total population of the municipality. Leirvik is also the largest urban area that is located in a municipality where Nynorsk is the preferred language form.

== Transportation ==
The town lies along the European route E39 highway, just east of the Stord Bridge which is part of the Triangle Link which connects a number of islands to the mainland via road bridges and an undersea tunnel. There is a ferry quay at Skjersholmane in the western part of the town which has regular ferry connections to the nearby islands of Halsnøya, Fjelbergøya, and Borgundøya which lie to the east in the Hardangerfjorden. A regular ferry connection to the nearby island of Huglo departs just north of Leirvik at the quay at Jektavik. In the main harbour of Leirvik, there are several daily express boat departures to nearby islands of Halsnøy, Fjellbergøy and Borgundøy as well as the villages of Husnes, Skånevik and Ølen and the county capital of Bergen. Stord Airport is located approximately 12 kilometres (7.5 mi) west of Leirvik center close to the village of Sagvåg. From the main bus terminal of Leirvik, there are local buses, as well as regional express buses towards Bergen to the north and Stavanger to the south.

== Media ==
The newspaper Sunnhordland is published in Leirvik, as well as the online newspaper Stord24. NRK also has a local office in Leirvik.

== Name ==
Confusingly, when Stord Municipality declared that the urban area of Leirvik was a town in 1997, they decided to name the town "Stord", with the village of Leirvik being the central part of the town. This was done because the Norwegian government required a populated place to have at least 5,000 residents in order to be called a town. Leirvik alone did not have enough residents unless the whole surrounding areas were also included, so the name "Stord" would represent the whole area. Even though this is the official name, the public acceptance of this has been minimal and controversial, and the name of the urban community remains "Leirvik".

The name Leirvik (Leirvík) translates into "clay bay". The name is derived from the Old Norse words leira which means "clay" and vík which means "bay". The name comes from the high concentration of clay in the ground. The locals often colloquially refer to Leirvik by the name "Vikjo", meaning "the bay" in local dialect, rather than "Leirvik".

== See also ==
- List of towns and cities in Norway
