= Stord Municipality =

Municipality in Vestland, Norway

Stord Municipality Stord kommune
- Municipality
- Stordøen herred (historic name)
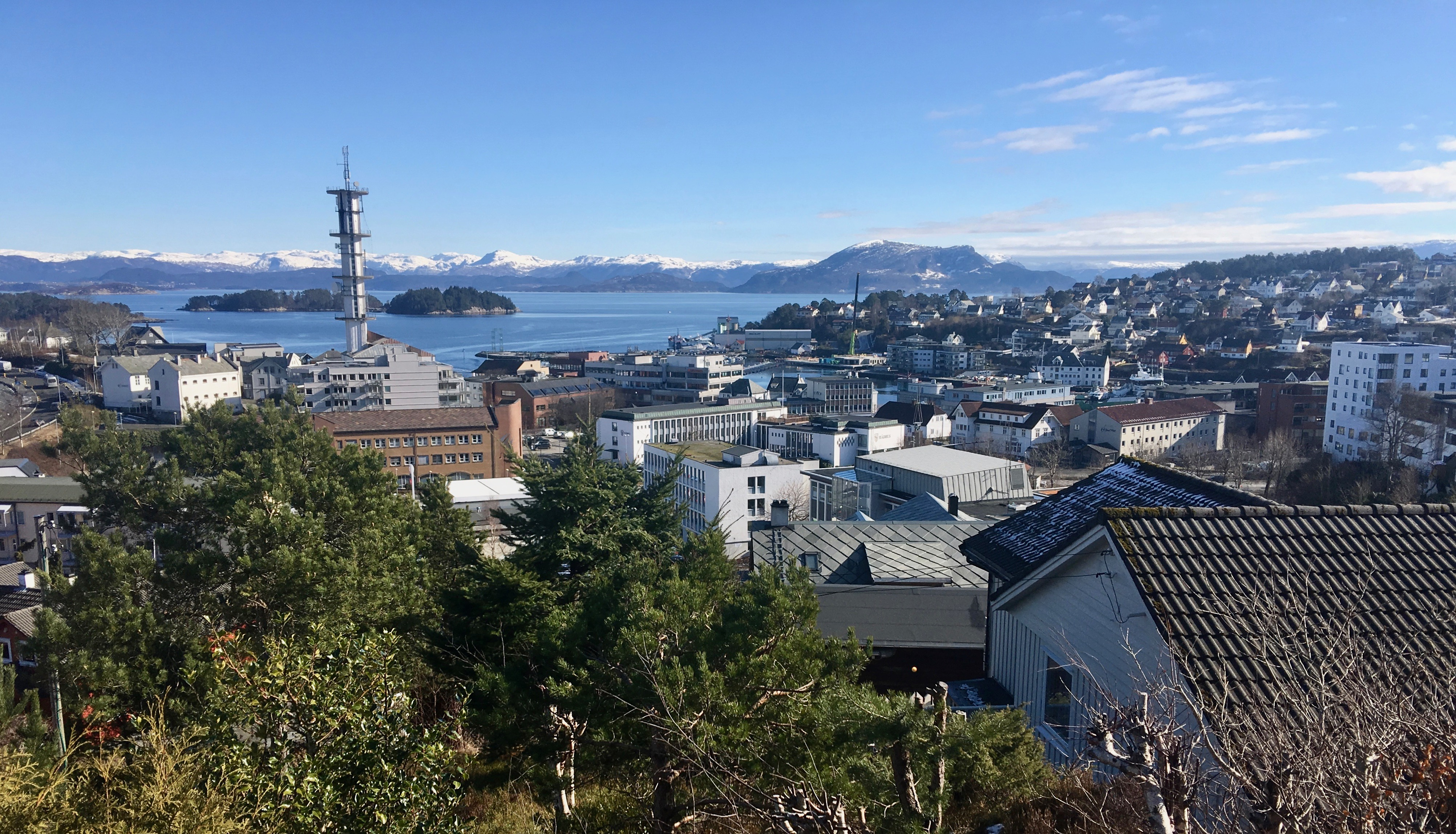
- View of the town of Leirvik

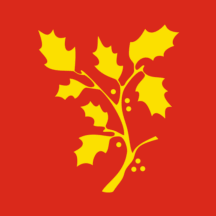
- Flag Coat of arms

- Vestland within Norway

- Stord within Vestland
- Coordinates: 59°48′29″N 05°27′59″E
- Country: Norway
- County: Vestland
- District: Sunnhordland
- Established: 1 Jan 1838
  - Created as: Formannskapsdistrikt
- Administrative centre: Leirvik

Government
  - Mayor (2023): Sigbjørn Framnes (FrP)

Area
  - Total: 143.72 km^{2} (55.49 sq mi)
  - Land: 137.45 km^{2} (53.07 sq mi)
  - Water: 6.27 km^{2} (2.42 sq mi) 4.4%
  - Rank: #317 in Norway
- Highest elevation: 749.25 m (2,458.2 ft)

Population (2025)
  - Total: 19,350
  - Rank: #70 in Norway
  - Density: 134.6/km^{2} (349/sq mi)
  - Change (10 years): ▲ +4.7%
- Demonym: Stordabu / Stording

Official language
  - Norwegian form: Nynorsk
- Time zone: UTC+01:00 (CET)
  - Summer (DST): UTC+02:00 (CEST)
- ISO 3166 code: NO-4614
- Website: Official website

Stord is a municipality in Vestland county, Norway. It is located in the traditional district of Sunnhordland. Stord Municipality is sometimes called "Norway in miniature" since it has such a variety of landscapes: coastline, fjords, forests, agricultural land, and mountain areas. The administrative centre of the municipality is the town of Leirvik, which is also the largest town in the municipality and the whole region of Sunnhordland. Leirvik was declared a town in 1997. Other population centres in the municipality include the large village of Sagvåg and the smaller villages of Litlabø and Grov.

The 143.72-square-kilometre (55.49 sq mi) municipality is the 317th largest by area out of the 357 municipalities in Norway. Stord Municipality is the 70th most populous municipality in Norway with a population of 19,350. The municipality's population density is 134.6 inhabitants per square kilometre (349/sq mi) and its population has increased by 4.7% over the previous 10-year period.

== General information ==
The parish of Stordøen (later spelled Stord) was established as a municipality on 1 January 1838 (see formannskapsdistrikt law). In 1863, Stordøen Municipality was divided: the northern district (population: 2,313) became the new Fitjar Municipality and the southern district (population: 2,634) remained as a smaller Stordøen Municipality.

On 15 May 1868, Stordøen Municipality was divided again: the southern mainland district (population: 900) became the new Valestrand Municipality and the northern district (population: 1,734) remained as a smaller Stordøen Municipality.

On 1 January 1898, the southern part of the island of Huglo (population: 117) was transferred from the neighboring Fjelberg Municipality to Stord Municipality.

On 1 January 1970, the small uninhabited part of the island of Stord along the Valvatnavågen that belonged to Bømlo Municipality was transferred to Stord Municipality.

=== Name ===
The municipality (originally the parish) is named after the large island of Stord (Old Norse: Storð). The meaning of the name is uncertain, but it may come from the word storð which means "ground" or "earth" (this is an old word that is still used in Icelandic literature). Before 1889, the name was spelled "Stordøen".

=== Coat of arms ===
Arms from 1955 until 1987.

Current arms since 1987.

The first coat of arms was adopted on 3 December 1955, but since it did not meet the government regulations, it was not formally approved by the King in council. The blazon is "Azure, a chevron and fire pit argent with flames Or (heraldry)". This means the arms have a blue field (background) and the charge is a chevron and a fire pit. The chevron and fire pit have a tincture of argent which means it is commonly colored white, but if it is made out of metal, then silver is used. The flame on the fire pit has a tincture of Or which means it is commonly colored yellow, but if it is made out of metal, then gold is used. Due to the fact that it uses two metals for tinctures, it was not approved since it violated heraldic principles. The chevron in the arms is derived from the arms of the Smør family, who used a chevron in their arms. The family was an important noble family in the 14th and 15th century who originated from this area. The flame symbolises the old industries in the village. The arms were designed by Magnus Hardeland. The municipal flag has the same design as the coat of arms.

A new coat of arms was designed during the 1980s in order to meet the national heraldry requirements. It was granted on 19 June 1987. The official blazon is "Gules, a holly branch Or" (Norwegian: På raud grunn ein gul kristtorn-kvist). This means the arms have a red field (background) and the charge is a holly branch with seven leaves and seven berries. The charge has a tincture of Or which means it is commonly colored yellow, but if it is made out of metal, then gold is used. The holly was chosen since it is a common tree in the municipality. The arms were designed by Truls Nygaard after an original idea by Harry Herstad. The municipal flag has the same design as the coat of arms.

=== Churches ===
The Church of Norway has two parishes (sokn) within Stord Municipality. It is part of the Sunnhordland prosti (deanery) in the Diocese of Bjørgvin.

Churches in Stord Municipality
Parish (sokn)	Church name	Location of the church	Year built
Stord	Stord Church	Leirvik	1857
Nysæter	Nysæter Church	Sagvåg	1991

== Geography ==
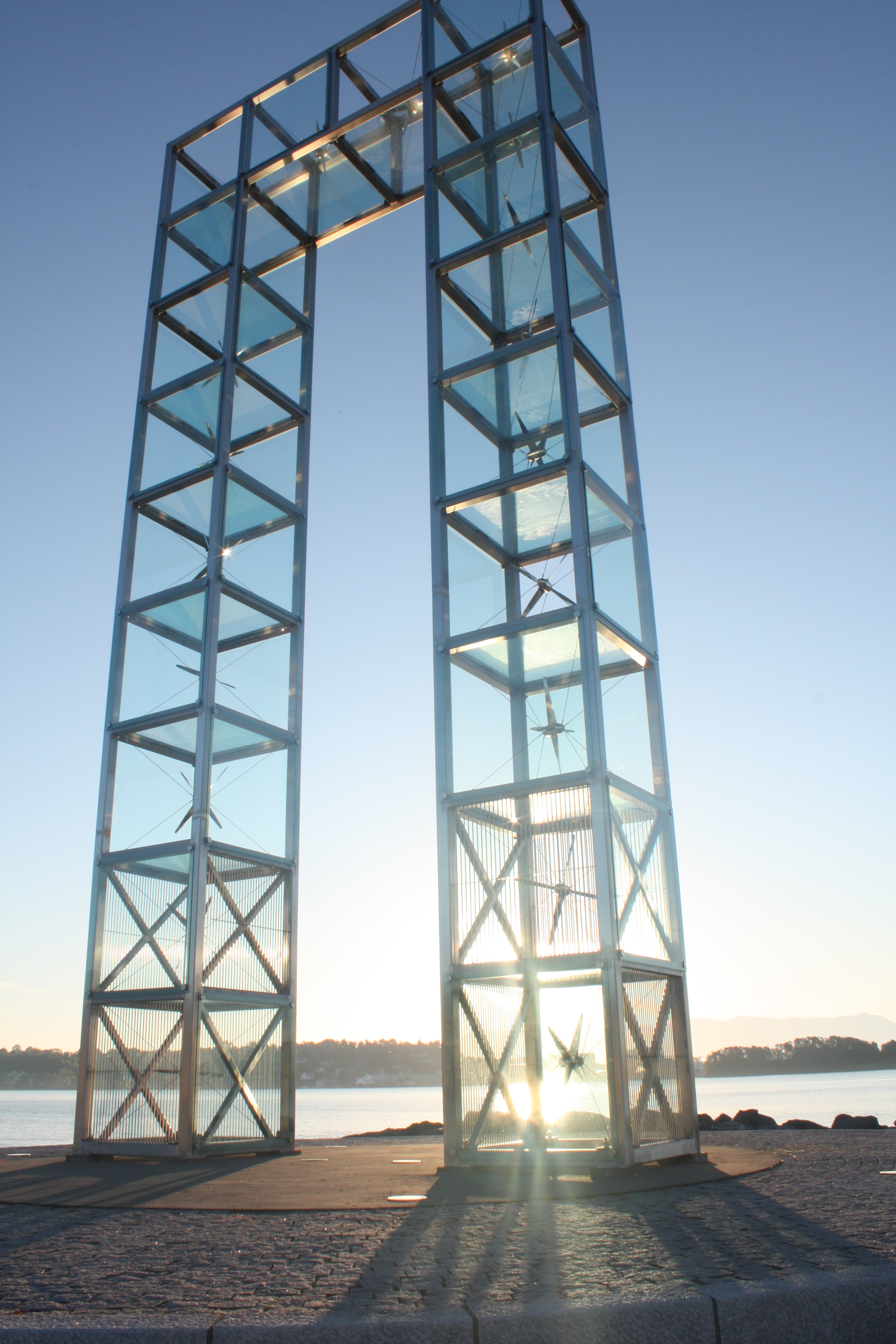
View of the Storddøra, a sculpture located in the Leirvik harbour

Stord Municipality is located on the southern half of the island of Stord (the northern part is part of Fitjar Municipality). The municipality also includes the islands of Huglo, Nautøya, and Føyno. The Hardangerfjorden runs along the southern border of the island municipality, separating it from the municipalities of Kvinnherad, Vindafjord, and Sveio. The Langenuen strait runs along the eastern side, separating it from Tysnes Municipality. The Stokksund and Digernessundet straits runs along the western border, separating it from Bømlo Municipality. The highest point in the municipality is the 749.25-metre (2,458.2 ft) tall mountain Mehammarsåta.

== History ==
The Battle of Stord was fought on or by this island between the Norwegian king Hakon Haraldsson and the Danish king Harald "Bluetooth" Gormsson, supported by Hakon's brother's sons led by Harald "Greycloak" Eiriksson.

== Population ==
Historical population

Year	Pop.	±% p.a.
1855	4,690	—
1865	2,634	−5.61%
1875	2,031	−2.57%
1891	2,261	+0.67%
1900	2,396	+0.65%
1910	3,150	+2.77%

Year	Pop.	±% p.a.
1920	3,972	+2.35%
1930	4,057	+0.21%
1946	5,030	+1.35%
1951	5,583	+2.11%
1960	7,470	+3.29%
1970	10,150	+3.11%

Year	Pop.	±% p.a.
1980	12,859	+2.39%
1990	14,483	+1.20%
2000	16,144	+1.09%
2010	17,565	+0.85%
2020	18,759	+0.66%
2023	19,098	+0.60%

Note: The municipal borders were changed in 1863, 1868, and 1898, causing a significant change in the population.
Source: Statistics Norway and Norwegian Historical Data Centre

== Economy ==
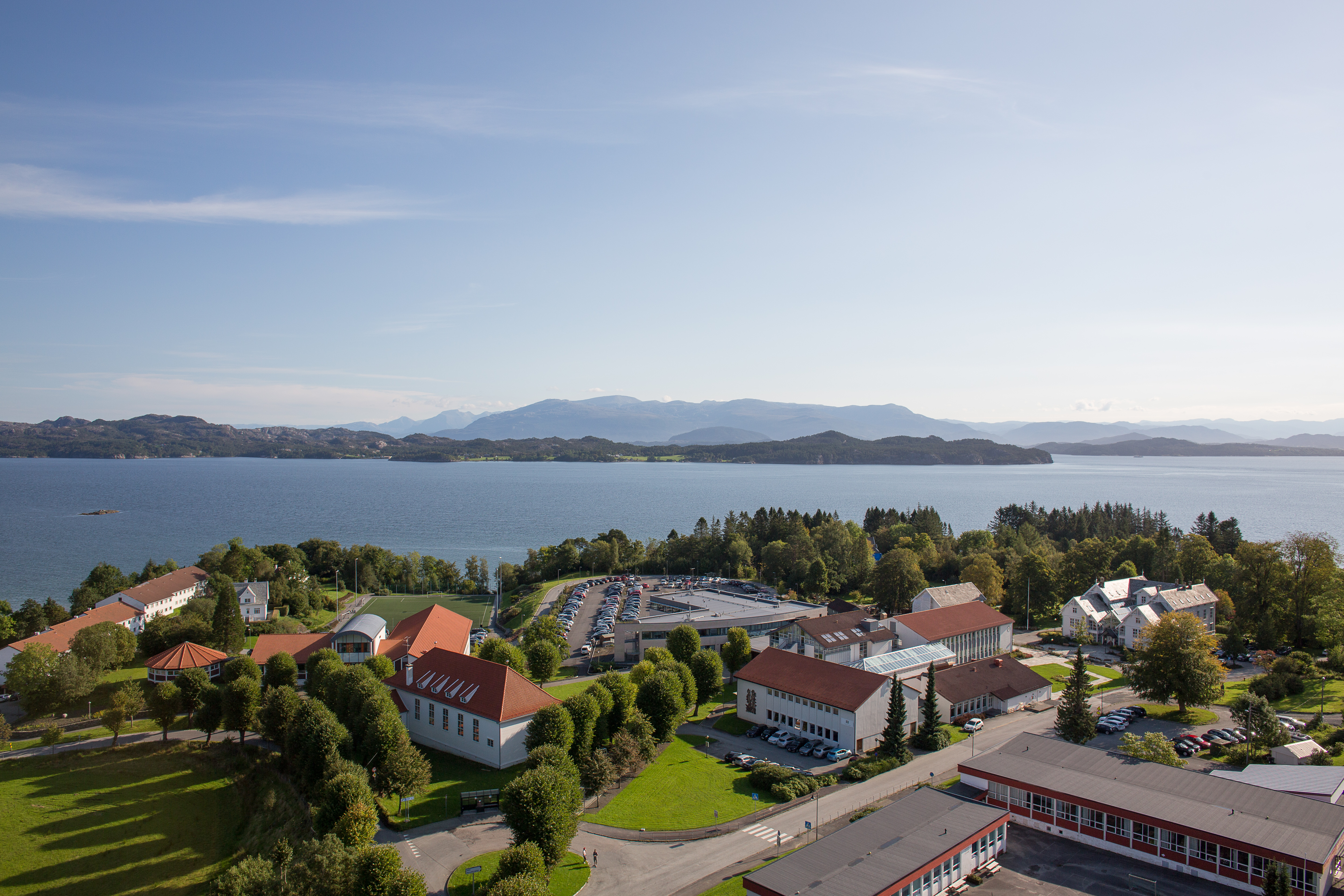
Campus Stord

The 3 largest private employers in Stord municipality are: Aker Solutions, Wärtsilä Norway AS and Leirvik AS. Together these three companies employ more than 3000 people.

Aker Solutions, situated south of Leirvik on the peninsula of Eldøyane, is the largest yard in Norway. Aker Solutions has built the biggest oil production platforms in the world, Gullfaks C and Troll.

== Transport ==
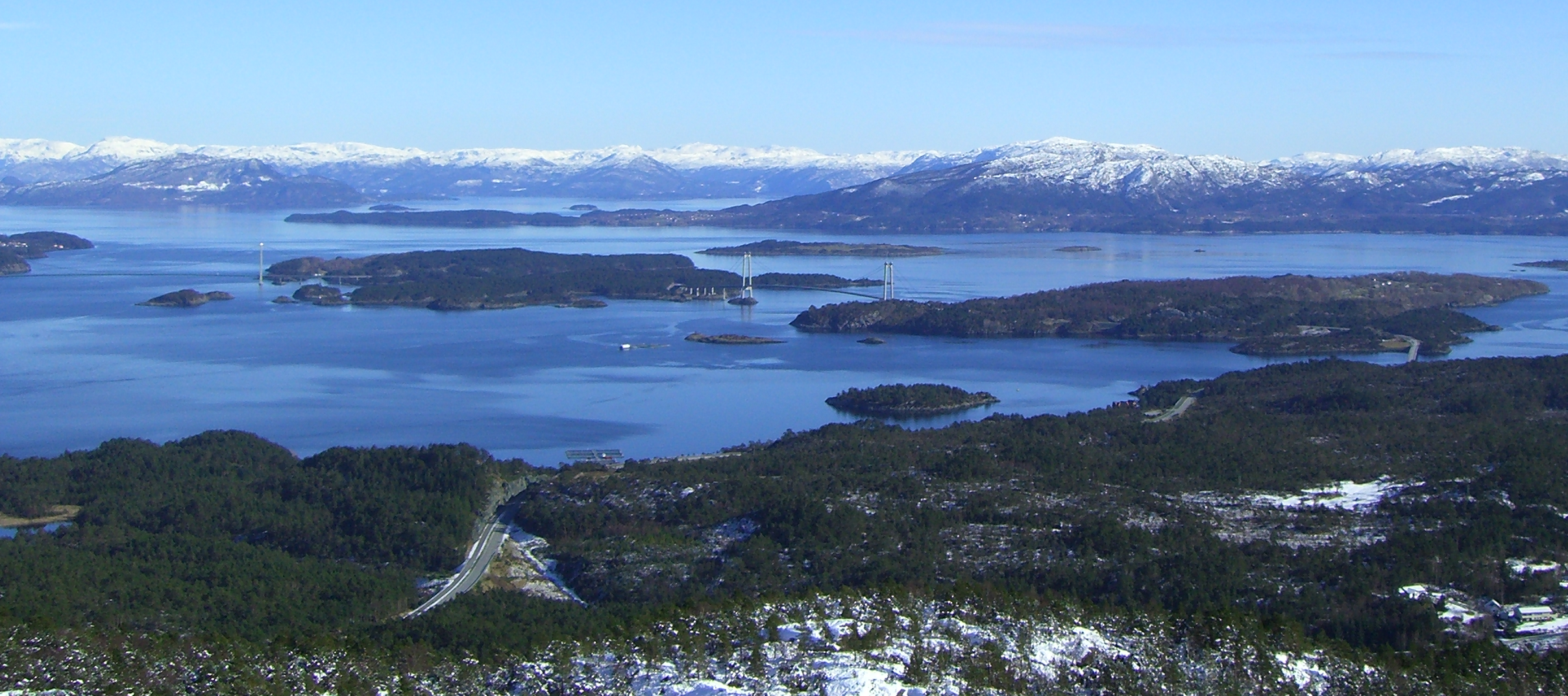
View of the Triangle Link

An extensive tunnel and bridge system, the Triangle Link, connected Stord to the mainland on 27 December 2000 and to the neighboring island of Bømlo on 30 April 2001. The bridges involved are the Bømla Bridge and Stord Bridge and the tunnel is the Bømlafjord Tunnel. The airport in Stord is Stord Airport, Sørstokken, is located northwest of Sagvåg on the Sørstokken peninsula. On 10 October 2006, Atlantic Airways Flight 670 skidded off the runway at the airport. Four people died.

== Healthcare ==
Stord Hospital is a local hospital for the municipalities in Sunnhordland, with a total of around 50,000 inhabitants. The hospital has specialist health services in medicine, surgery, X-ray, and gynecology. Stord District Psychiatric Center (DPS) is close by and has specialist health services within mental health care for adults and children. Stord ambulance station has premises in the same area and Sunnhordland inter-municipal emergency room is co-located with the hospital.

== Government ==
Stord Municipality is responsible for primary education (through 10th grade), outpatient health services, senior citizen services, welfare and other social services, zoning, economic development, and municipal roads and utilities. The municipality is governed by a municipal council of directly elected representatives. The mayor is indirectly elected by a vote of the municipal council. The municipality is under the jurisdiction of the Haugaland og Sunnhordland District Court and the Gulating Court of Appeal.

=== Municipal council ===
The municipal council (Kommunestyre) of Stord Municipality is made up of 35 representatives that are elected to four year terms. The tables below show the current and historical composition of the council by political party.

Stord kommunestyre 2023–2027
Party name (in Nynorsk)	Number of representatives
Labour Party (Arbeidarpartiet)	10
Progress Party (Framstegspartiet)	7
Conservative Party (Høgre)	8
Industry and Business Party (Industri‑ og Næringspartiet)	2
Christian Democratic Party (Kristeleg Folkeparti)	2
Red Party (Raudt)	1
Centre Party (Senterpartiet)	1
Socialist Left Party (Sosialistisk Venstreparti)	3
Liberal Party (Venstre)	1
Total number of members:	35

Stord kommunestyre 2019–2023
Party name (in Nynorsk)	Number of representatives
Labour Party (Arbeidarpartiet)	11
Progress Party (Framstegspartiet)	6
Green Party (Miljøpartiet Dei Grøne)	1
Conservative Party (Høgre)	6
Christian Democratic Party (Kristeleg Folkeparti)	2
Red Party (Raudt)	1
Centre Party (Senterpartiet)	5
Socialist Left Party (Sosialistisk Venstreparti)	2
Liberal Party (Venstre)	1
Total number of members:	35

Stord kommunestyre 2015–2019
Party name (in Nynorsk)	Number of representatives
Labour Party (Arbeidarpartiet)	11
Progress Party (Framstegspartiet)	4
Green Party (Miljøpartiet Dei Grøne)	1
Conservative Party (Høgre)	6
Christian Democratic Party (Kristeleg Folkeparti)	3
Pensioners' Party (Pensjonistpartiet)	1
Centre Party (Senterpartiet)	3
Socialist Left Party (Sosialistisk Venstreparti)	4
Liberal Party (Venstre)	2
Stord List (Stordlisto)	2
Total number of members:	35

Stord kommunestyre 2011–2015
Party name (in Nynorsk)	Number of representatives
Labour Party (Arbeidarpartiet)	10
Progress Party (Framstegspartiet)	5
Conservative Party (Høgre)	9
Christian Democratic Party (Kristeleg Folkeparti)	3
The Democrats (Demokratane)	1
Centre Party (Senterpartiet)	3
Socialist Left Party (Sosialistisk Venstreparti)	2
Liberal Party (Venstre)	2
Total number of members:	35

Stord kommunestyre 2007–2011
Party name (in Nynorsk)	Number of representatives
Labour Party (Arbeidarpartiet)	8
Progress Party (Framstegspartiet)	6
Conservative Party (Høgre)	6
Christian Democratic Party (Kristeleg Folkeparti)	4
The Democrats (Demokratane)	2
Centre Party (Senterpartiet)	3
Socialist Left Party (Sosialistisk Venstreparti)	3
Liberal Party (Venstre)	3
Total number of members:	35

Stord kommunestyre 2003–2007
Party name (in Nynorsk)	Number of representatives
Labour Party (Arbeidarpartiet)	14
Progress Party (Framstegspartiet)	6
Conservative Party (Høgre)	3
Christian Democratic Party (Kristeleg Folkeparti)	4
The Democrats (Demokratane)	1
Centre Party (Senterpartiet)	1
Socialist Left Party (Sosialistisk Venstreparti)	4
Liberal Party (Venstre)	2
Total number of members:	35

Stord kommunestyre 1999–2003
Party name (in Nynorsk)	Number of representatives
Labour Party (Arbeidarpartiet)	14
Progress Party (Framstegspartiet)	6
Conservative Party (Høgre)	4
Christian Democratic Party (Kristeleg Folkeparti)	5
Centre Party (Senterpartiet)	1
Socialist Left Party (Sosialistisk Venstreparti)	3
Liberal Party (Venstre)	2
Total number of members:	35

Stord kommunestyre 1995–1999
Party name (in Nynorsk)	Number of representatives
Labour Party (Arbeidarpartiet)	13
Progress Party (Framstegspartiet)	7
Conservative Party (Høgre)	6
Christian Democratic Party (Kristeleg Folkeparti)	7
Centre Party (Senterpartiet)	3
Socialist Left Party (Sosialistisk Venstreparti)	6
Liberal Party (Venstre)	3
Total number of members:	45

Stord kommunestyre 1991–1995
Party name (in Nynorsk)	Number of representatives
Labour Party (Arbeidarpartiet)	11
Progress Party (Framstegspartiet)	4
Conservative Party (Høgre)	8
Christian Democratic Party (Kristeleg Folkeparti)	7
Centre Party (Senterpartiet)	3
Socialist Left Party (Sosialistisk Venstreparti)	10
Liberal Party (Venstre)	2
Total number of members:	45

Stord kommunestyre 1987–1991
Party name (in Nynorsk)	Number of representatives
Labour Party (Arbeidarpartiet)	14
Progress Party (Framstegspartiet)	7
Conservative Party (Høgre)	7
Christian Democratic Party (Kristeleg Folkeparti)	8
Centre Party (Senterpartiet)	2
Socialist Left Party (Sosialistisk Venstreparti)	3
Liberal Party (Venstre)	4
Total number of members:	45

Stord kommunestyre 1983–1987
Party name (in Nynorsk)	Number of representatives
Labour Party (Arbeidarpartiet)	15
Progress Party (Framstegspartiet)	3
Conservative Party (Høgre)	9
Christian Democratic Party (Kristeleg Folkeparti)	8
Liberal People's Party (Liberale Folkepartiet)	1
Centre Party (Senterpartiet)	2
Socialist Left Party (Sosialistisk Venstreparti)	4
Liberal Party (Venstre)	3
Total number of members:	45

Stord kommunestyre 1979–1983
Party name (in Nynorsk)	Number of representatives
Labour Party (Arbeidarpartiet)	11
Progress Party (Framstegspartiet)	2
Conservative Party (Høgre)	12
Christian Democratic Party (Kristeleg Folkeparti)	9
New People's Party (Nye Folkepartiet)	2
Centre Party (Senterpartiet)	2
Socialist Left Party (Sosialistisk Venstreparti)	4
Liberal Party (Venstre)	3
Total number of members:	45

Stord kommunestyre 1975–1979
Party name (in Nynorsk)	Number of representatives
Labour Party (Arbeidarpartiet)	15
Conservative Party (Høgre)	8
Christian Democratic Party (Kristeleg Folkeparti)	10
New People's Party (Nye Folkepartiet)	3
Centre Party (Senterpartiet)	3
Socialist Left Party (Sosialistisk Venstreparti)	3
Liberal Party (Venstre)	3
Total number of members:	45

Stord kommunestyre 1971–1975
Party name (in Nynorsk)	Number of representatives
Labour Party (Arbeidarpartiet)	13
Conservative Party (Høgre)	5
Christian Democratic Party (Kristeleg Folkeparti)	6
Centre Party (Senterpartiet)	3
Liberal Party (Venstre)	5
Socialist common list (Venstresosialistiske felleslister)	3
Total number of members:	35

Stord kommunestyre 1967–1971
Party name (in Nynorsk)	Number of representatives
Labour Party (Arbeidarpartiet)	15
Conservative Party (Høgre)	5
Communist Party (Kommunistiske Parti)	1
Christian Democratic Party (Kristeleg Folkeparti)	5
Centre Party (Senterpartiet)	2
Liberal Party (Venstre)	7
Total number of members:	35

Stord kommunestyre 1963–1967
Party name (in Nynorsk)	Number of representatives
Labour Party (Arbeidarpartiet)	16
Conservative Party (Høgre)	4
Communist Party (Kommunistiske Parti)	1
Christian Democratic Party (Kristeleg Folkeparti)	6
Centre Party (Senterpartiet)	1
Liberal Party (Venstre)	6
Local List(s) (Lokale lister)	1
Total number of members:	35

Stord heradsstyre 1959–1963
Party name (in Nynorsk)	Number of representatives
Labour Party (Arbeidarpartiet)	11
Conservative Party (Høgre)	4
Communist Party (Kommunistiske Parti)	2
Christian Democratic Party (Kristeleg Folkeparti)	5
Centre Party (Senterpartiet)	1
Liberal Party (Venstre)	5
Local List(s) (Lokale lister)	1
Total number of members:	29

Stord heradsstyre 1955–1959
Party name (in Nynorsk)	Number of representatives
Labour Party (Arbeidarpartiet)	11
Conservative Party (Høgre)	3
Communist Party (Kommunistiske Parti)	3
Christian Democratic Party (Kristeleg Folkeparti)	5
Farmers' Party (Bondepartiet)	2
Liberal Party (Venstre)	4
Local List(s) (Lokale lister)	1
Total number of members:	29

Stord heradsstyre 1951–1955
Party name (in Nynorsk)	Number of representatives
Labour Party (Arbeidarpartiet)	6
Communist Party (Kommunistiske Parti)	2
Christian Democratic Party (Kristeleg Folkeparti)	4
Local List(s) (Lokale lister)	8
Total number of members:	20

Stord heradsstyre 1947–1951
Party name (in Nynorsk)	Number of representatives
Labour Party (Arbeidarpartiet)	5
Communist Party (Kommunistiske Parti)	2
Christian Democratic Party (Kristeleg Folkeparti)	5
Joint List(s) of Non-Socialist Parties (Borgarlege Felleslister)	8
Total number of members:	20

Stord heradsstyre 1945–1947
Party name (in Nynorsk)	Number of representatives
Labour Party (Arbeidarpartiet)	4
Communist Party (Kommunistiske Parti)	4
Christian Democratic Party (Kristeleg Folkeparti)	4
Local List(s) (Lokale lister)	8
Total number of members:	20

Stord heradsstyre 1937–1941*
Party name (in Nynorsk)	Number of representatives
Labour Party (Arbeidarpartiet)	7
Local List(s) (Lokale lister)	13
Total number of members:	20
Note: Due to the German occupation of Norway during World War II, no elections were held for new municipal councils until after the war ended in 1945.

=== Mayors ===
The mayor (Nynorsk: ordførar) of Stord Municipality is the political leader of the municipality and the chairperson of the municipal council. The following people have held this position:

- 1838–1851: Claus Daae
- 1852–1853: Morten Baade
- 1853–1853: Christofer Juel Olsen
- 1854–1857: Mikkel Sjursen Eide
- 1858–1859: Søren Vincent Hagerup
- 1860–1861: Nils Christophersen Sundnæs
- 1862–1863: Thorbjørn Johannessen Eidsvaag
- 1864–1883: Baard Madsen Haugland (V)
- 1884–1891: Østen Larsen Eskeland (V)
- 1892–1897: Per Mikkelsen Lønning (V)
- 1898–1901: Østen Larsen Eskeland (V)
- 1902–1907: Peter Vogelius Bredal Deinboll (H)
- 1908–1931: Ole Olsen Høyland (V)
- 1932–1934: Nils Økland (V)
- 1935–1942: Severin Eskeland (V)
- 1942–1942: Edvard Tjelmeland (NS)
- 1943–1944: Jon Gjerstad (NS)
- 1945–1945: Reidar Johannessen (NS)
- 1945–1955: Ola Høyland (Bp)
- 1956–1963: Onar Onarheim (H)
- 1964–1971: Amund Engelsen (V)
- 1972–1979: Syvert Birkenes (KrF)
- 1980–1981: Onar Onarheim (H)
- 1982–1991: Werner Eiler Hagerup (KrF)
- 1991–2007: Magne Rommetveit (Ap)
- 2007–2015: Liv Kari Eskeland (H)
- 2015–2017: Harry Herstad (Ap)
- 2017–2023: Gaute Straume Epland (Ap)
- 2023–present: Sigbjørn Framnes (FrP)

== Notable people ==
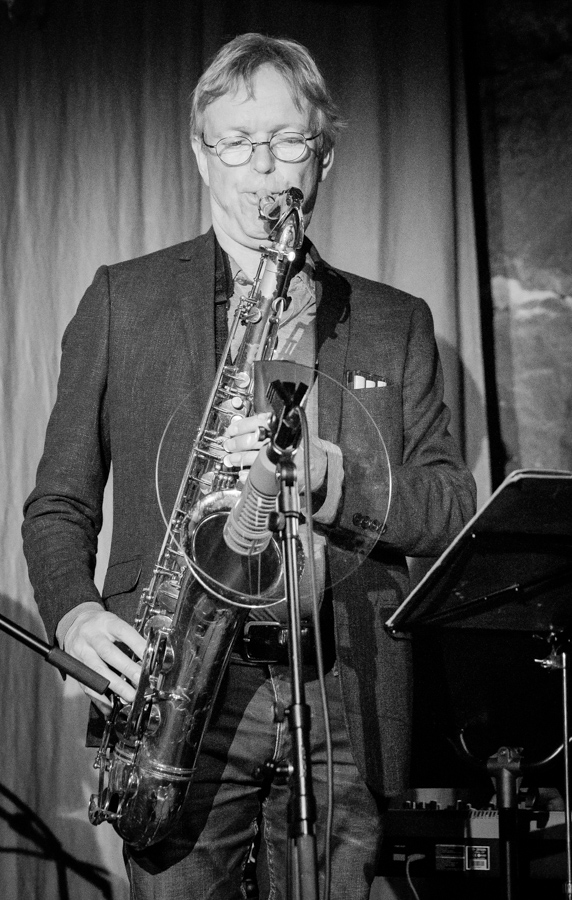
Jan Kåre Hysta, 2017

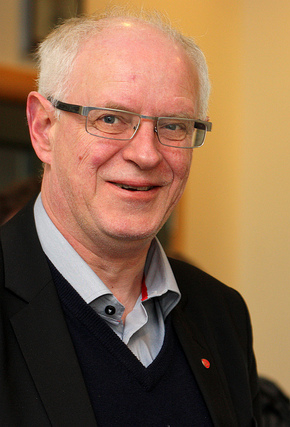
Magne Rommetveit, 2012

- Lars Eskeland (1867–1942), an educator, writer, and proponent of Nynorsk
- Olaf Lange (1875–1965), a painter who visualised the complexity of the modern urban life with symbolistic paintings who lived in Stord around 1950
- Olaf Kullmann (1892–1942), a Norwegian naval officer and then peace activist
- Magne Rommetveit (1918–2009), a Norwegian lexicographer
- Ragnar Rommetveit (1924–2017), a psychologist and academic
- Ivar Eskeland (1927–2005), a philologist, publisher, translator, biographer, literary critic, newspaper editor, theatre worker, and radio personality
- Hans J. Røsjorde (born 1941), a politician and County Governor of Oslo and Akershus from 2001 to 2011
- Jan Kåre Hystad (born 1955), a jazz musician who plays saxophone, clarinet, and flute
- Rune Belsvik (born 1956), a novelist, playwright, short story writer, and children's writer
- Magne Rommetveit (born 1956), a Norwegian politician and mayor of Stord from 1992–2007
- Ole Jacob Hystad (born 1960), a jazz musician who plays tenor saxophone and clarinet
- Janove Ottesen (born 1975), a musician who sings and plays guitar and barrels
- Synnøve Macody Lund (born 1976), a journalist, film critic, model, and actress
- Obtained Enslavement (formed 1989 in Stord - 2000), a black metal band from Stord

=== Sport ===
- Geirmund Brendesæter (born 1970), a former footballer with nearly 300 club caps
- Gro Espeseth (born 1972), a former footballer with 105 caps for Norway women
- Odd Christian Eiking (born 1994), a cyclist
- Anders Mol (born 1997), a beach volleyball player
