= Sagvåg =

Village in Stord Municipality, Norway

- Village
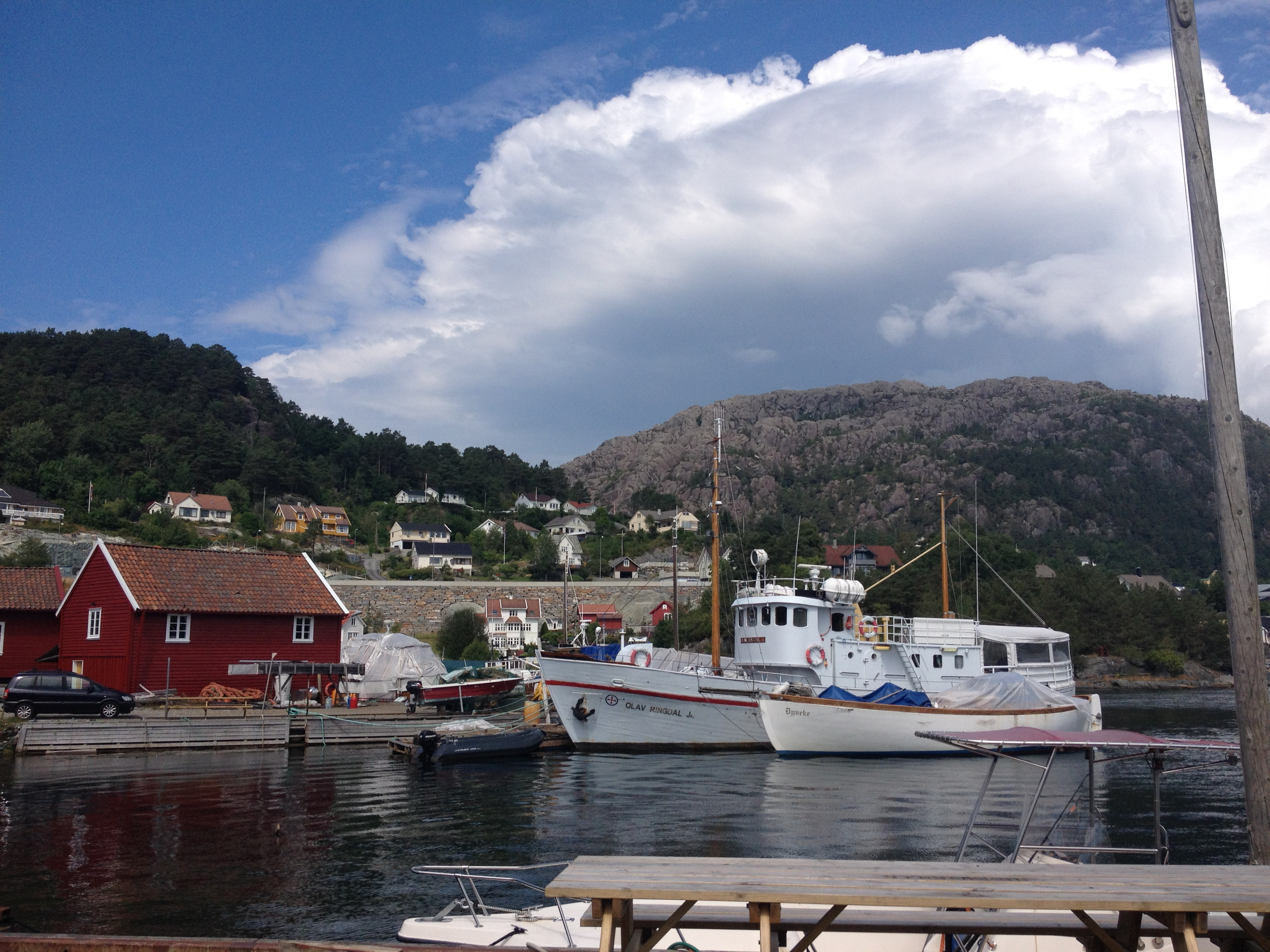
- View of the village harbour
- Interactive map of Sagvåg
- Coordinates: 59.78121°N 5.38858°E
- Country: Norway
- Region: Western Norway
- County: Vestland
- District: Sunnhordland
- Municipality: Stord Municipality

Area
  - Total: 2.65 km^{2} (1.02 sq mi)
- Elevation: 27 m (89 ft)

Population (2025)
  - Total: 3,477
  - Density: 1,312/km^{2} (3,400/sq mi)
- Time zone: UTC+01:00 (CET)
  - Summer (DST): UTC+02:00 (CEST)
- Post Code: 5410 Sagvåg

Sagvåg is a village in Stord Municipality in Vestland county, Norway. The village is located on the southwest coast of the island of Stord, about 5 kilometres (3.1 mi) west of the town of Leirvik. The Stord Airport, Sørstokken lies about 2 kilometres (1.2 mi) northwest of Sagvåg. Nysæter Church was built here in 1991 to serve the population of the village. The small mining village of Litlabø lies just northeast of Sagvåg.

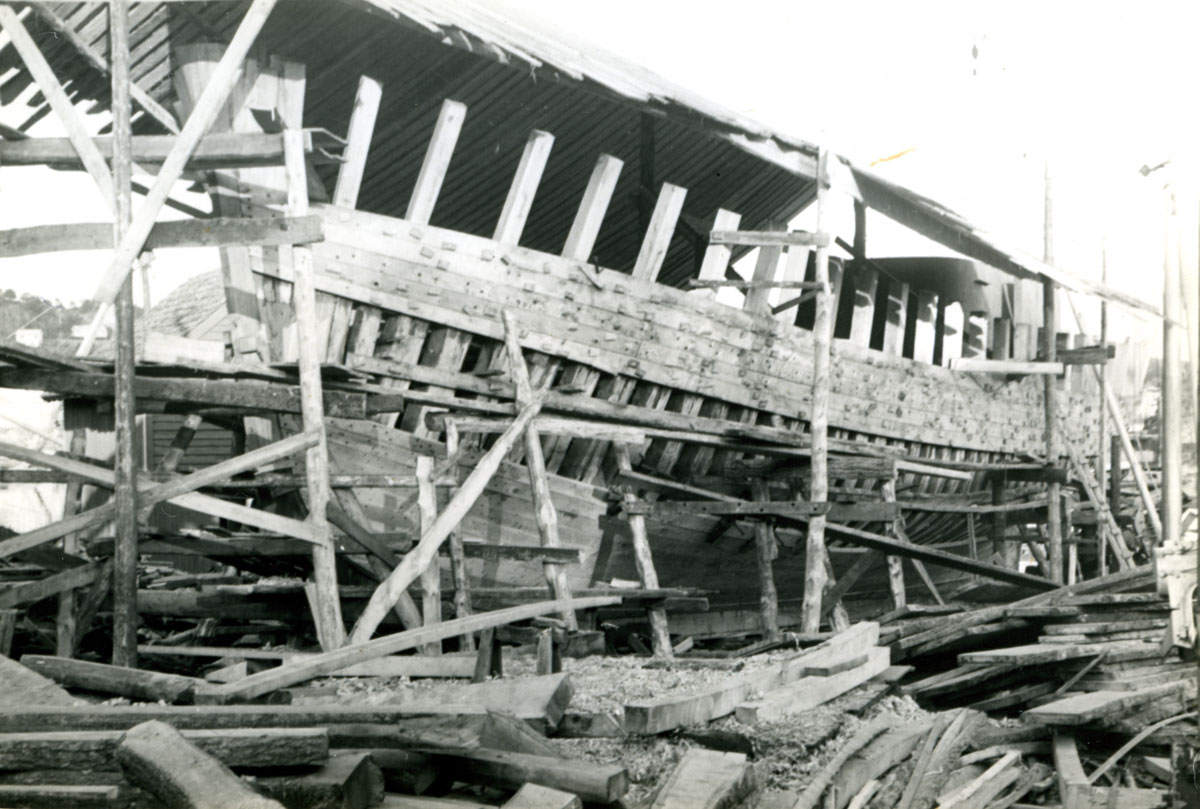
View of a boat being built at Ottesens Skipsbyggeri in Sagvåg. (date unknown)

The 2.65-square-kilometre (650-acre) village has a population (2025) of 3,477 and a population density of 1,312 inhabitants per square kilometre (3,400/sq mi). This makes it Sunnhordland's second largest community, after the nearby town of Leirvik.

Wärtsilä Norway AS has a factory in Sagvåg, producing automation systems for the marine industry. The harbour of Sagvåg is noted to be excellent for visiting leisure boats. There was considerable shipbuilding activities in Sagvåg up until the 1960s, building wooden fishing and whaling vessels. Prior to the construction of the Triangle Link bridges and tunnel in 2001, Sagvåg was a ferry port with regular ferry routes connecting the islands of Stord and Bømlo to the west.
