= Stord Bridge =

Suspension bridge in Stord, Norway

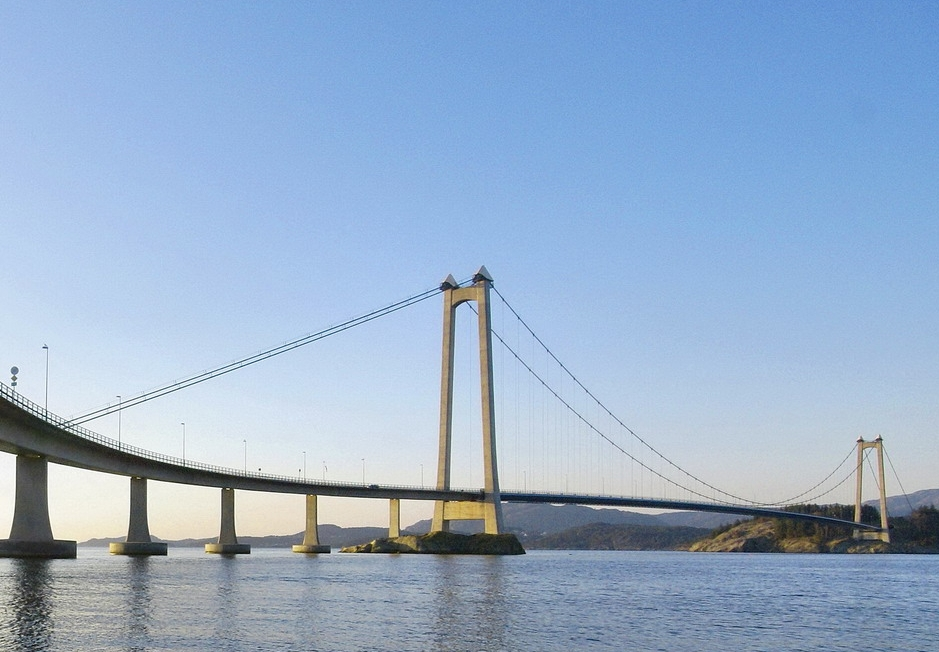
- Coordinates: 59°44′51″N 5°24′10″E
- Carries: Two lanes of E39; One pedestrian/bicycle path
- Crosses: Digernessundet
- Locale: Stord Municipality, Norway
- Official name: Stordabrua
- Maintained by: Norwegian Public Roads Administration

Characteristics
- Design: Suspension bridge
- Total length: 1,077 m (3,533 ft)
- Width: 13.5 m (44 ft)
- Longest span: 677 m (2,221 ft)
- Clearance below: 18 m (59 ft)

History
- Opened: 28 December 2000

Statistics
- Daily traffic: 6,690

Location
- Interactive map of Stord Bridge

The Stord Bridge (Norwegian: Stordabrua) is a suspension bridge which crosses Digernessundet between the islands of Stord and Føyno in Stord Municipality in Vestland county, Norway. The bridge is 1,077 meters (3,533 ft) long, has a main span of 677 meters (2,221 ft) and a clearance below of 18 meters (59 ft). It carries two lanes of European Route E39 and a combined pedestrian and bicycle pathway. It is part of the Triangle Link, a fixed link which connects the islands of Stord and Bømlo, and both to the mainland. In 2010, the bridge had an average 5,021 vehicles per day. The bridge and the link was a toll road from the opening until 30 May 2013.

Plans for a crossing arose in the 1960s; and until the 1990s proposals were for a pontoon bridge further north. The Stord Bridge was conceived after the decision to combine the crossing with the Bømlafjord Tunnel. The project was resisted both by local environmental groups and the Norwegian Public Roads Administration, the latter because the new plans would delay completion. Construction was undertaken by a joint venue between NCC and HBG Steel Structures. Construction started in 1999 and was the first bridge in Norway to have the cables spun on-site. The bridge cost 442 million Norwegian krone (NOK) and was taken into use on 27 December 2000.

== Background ==
The motivation for the Triangle Link was the desire to have a fixed link between the islands of Stord and Bømlo. The first documented proposals were made in the 1960s and involved building a pontoon bridge across Stokksund, inspired by the plans to build what would become the Nordhordland Bridge north of Bergen. In 1973, the municipal councils of Bømlo, Stord and Fitjar decided to launch a planning process, which concluded that a pontoon bridge between Sørstokken and Foldrøyholmen would be optimal. The report also considered bridges across the Fitjar Archipelago and a crossing via Spissøy and Føyno. There were protests from the shipping industry, who wished to continue to use the strait for ship traffic. The islands were connected with a network of five ferry services: Skjersholmane–Valevåg connected Stord and Sveio, Skjersholmane–Utbjoa connected Stord and Vindafjord, Sagvåg–Siggjarvåg connected Stord and Bølmo, and Bømlo was connected to the mainland both by the Mosterhamn–Valevåg Ferry and the Langevåg–Buavåg Ferry.

In the early 1980s, plans for Stord Airport, Sørstokken were launched. Thus, the plans for a bridge crossing Stokksundet were again raised in 1982, this time by the industry on Bømlo, who would have to travel by ferry to reach the new airport. A committee was established in May 1983, which gave Engineer Harald Møyner the assignment of producing a new report. He launched three proposals: a pontoon or suspension bridge between Foldrøyholmen and Litlaneset; a suspension bridge between Setraneset and Sokkbleikjo, which would terminate just south of the new airport; and a combined fixed link between Spissøy and Digernes, without passing via the Fitjar Archipelago. The latter proposal was the first time a fixed link to the mainland was proposed. The Norwegian Civil Aviation Administration protested against a possible suspension bridge near the airport, but stated that one further away would be fine.

A map of the Triangle Link and the ferry services it replaced

Surveys of traffic patterns on Bømlo were undertaken by Vestland Public Roads Administration in 1984. Based on it and other feedback, the agency stated that it preferred a pontoon bridge between Foldrøyholmen and Sørstokken, north of the ferry between Bømlo and Stord. It was estimated to cost NOK 190 million, in addition to auxiliary roads for NOK 40 million. In 1982, plans were launched for a fixed link to the mainland further south, which would include a bridge over Digernessundet, a causeway and low bridge across Spissøysundet and a low bridge over Gassasundet. In addition, a tunnel would have to be built from Føyno to Sveio. This proposal was similar to the finalized Triangle Link. In 1985, an all-tunnel proposal, following the same route, was proposed. Hordaland Public Roads Administration stated that the proposals were unrealistic. The limited company Ytre Sunnhordland Bru- og Tunnelselskap AS (SBT) was founded in October 1986 by the municipalities of Bømlo, Stord, Fitjar and Sveio, Hordaland County Municipality and five banks.

In December 1986, the Public Road Administration recommended a bridge solution. SBT changed its name to Sunnhordland Bru- og Tunnelselskap, and a majority of the board shifted towards being in favor of a fixed link. The Norwegian Coastal Administration stated that they would not allow a pontoon bridge. On 26 June 1987, SBT decided to work towards permission to collect advanced tolls on the ferry services. The board unanimously supported the triangular proposal on 16 September, which was estimated to cost NOK 660 million. This was criticized by Hordaland Public Roads Administration, who stated that it would take longer time to plan, and thus complete, the Triangle Link.

From 1988, environmentalists started actively opposing the Triangle Link. The most active were the local chapter of the Norwegian Society for the Conservation of Nature and Nature and Youth, who stated that the road would have serious consequences for the local boat traffic to the recreational islands of Føyno and Nautøy. Instead, they recommended that the municipalities chose a pontoon bridge. Another opponent to the project was the Action Committee Against a Hasty Construction of the Triangle Link, who argued to delay the decision until after the 1991 municipal elections, to ensure that the municipal councils had backing in the public. Gisle Tjong stated that the risk in the project was large and that it was uncertain how long the tolls would last: they could just as well be 60 as 15 years. He instead wanted to collect tolls in advance.

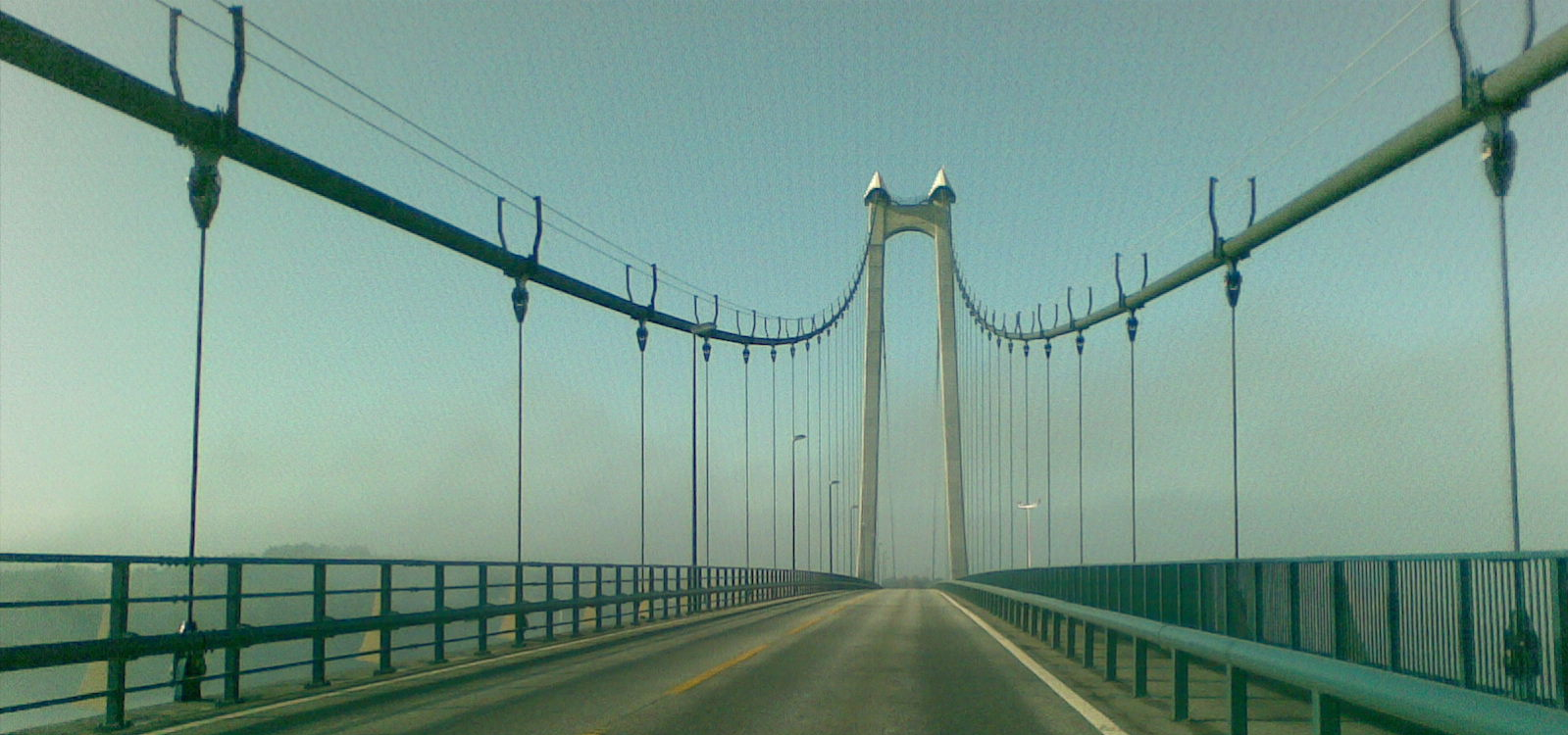
The bridge deck

The Triangle Link was passed by the various municipal councils in February and March 1988. Hordaland Public Roads Administration still supported a pontoon bridge, and stated that two and a half years of work on a master plan had been wasted. A new master plan for the Triangle Link was published in early 1989. During late 1989, advance tolls on the ferries was approved by the municipal councils and the county council. They recommended that collection start on 1 July 1990, but this was not immediately supported by the government.

In July 1991, the master plan was passed by the Council of State. On 10 December 1992, Parliament approved advanced payment of tolls on the ferry, which were made effective from 1 January 1993. Ticket prices increased with between NOK 10 and 12. This resulted in protests from the ferry employees who stated that they would have to collect the tolls which would remove their jobs. Work on the development plan started in 1992. It included safety and environmental improvements which increased the project's cost by NOK 200 million. In May 1994, the plans was made subject to consultative statements. In May, SBT proposed building a culvert on Digernes as a compromise to avoid a new plan which could have postponed the project several years. On 11 June 1996, Parliament approved with 144 against 20 votes to build the Triangle Link. The original name proposal for the bridge was Stordbrua; this was later changed to Stordabrua after input from the municipal councils and name committees.

== Construction ==
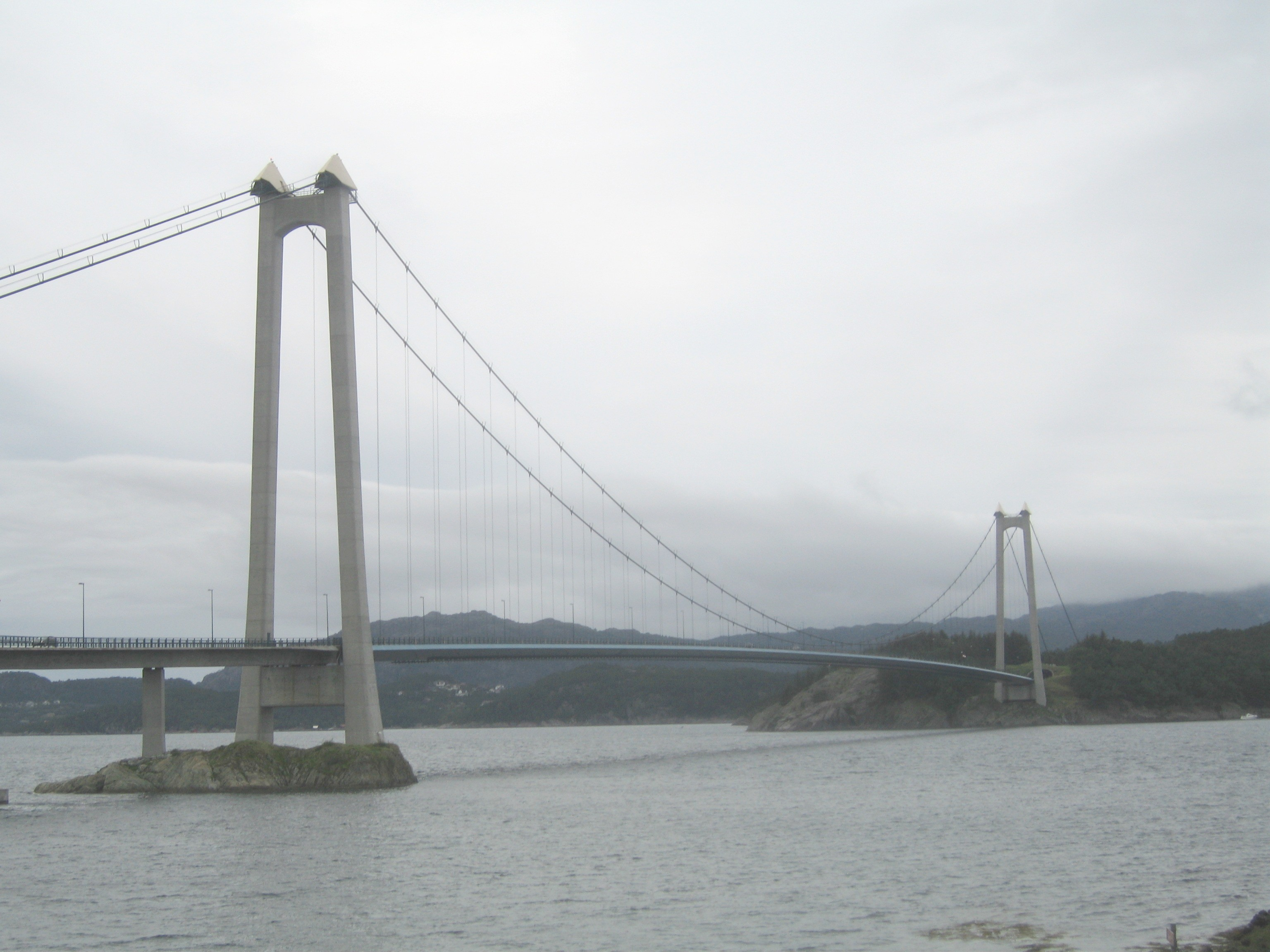
The bridge looking towards Stord

The construction of the Stord Bridge was undertaken as part of the same contract as the Bømla Bridge, which was awarded in December 1998 to Triangle Contractors, a joint venture between NCC and HBG Steel Structures. Most of the work was carried out by NCC with HBG having responsibility for the steel parts of the deck and the cables. HBG had previously built the steel for the Osterøy Bridge, which opened in 1997. The responsibility for the cables was given to Brown Beach Associates and Hordaland Mekaniske Verksted. Construction started on 20 February 1999. After the pylons were completed on 25 September 1999, two catwalks were erected between them, with the constructors choosing two continuous catwalks instead of three separate pairs. Extra stability to the catwalks was achieved by building connections between the two.

The cables were spun on-site using a reel because of the problems which had arisen using a bundle on the Great Belt Bridge in Denmark. This also allowed for cost savings, as the reels could be used two times. The cables were spun using air spinning with controlled tension, which allowed spinning with little space and with a crew with limited spinning experience. This involved installing a carrier which shuttles forward and back over the catwalk; it spins the upper side of the cable in the one direction and the lower side in the other direction. The system has two reel racks, each with four reels of wire. Each rack only uses one reel at a time, allowing for minimum down-time when changing reels. Wires were connected using pressure casing. The balance in the system is kept in place using a counterbalance tower. Spinning of the main cable started on 2 March 2000 and was concluded on 14 April. In all 11,600 kilometers (7,200 mi) of steel wire were used to create the cables. The two bridges were the first time that on-site spinning was chosen in Norway, and it gave a cost saving of NOK 10 to 11 million.

The cables consist of seven bundles which consist of 420 wires—each with a diameter of 5.35 millimeters (0.211 in). When compressed, this gives a diameter of 320 millimeters (13 in) and a quality of 1,570 megapascals. The fastening poles were delivered five weeks after schedule; a new mounting method was developed which allowed them to be installed in a quarter of the time, in part by using a helicopter, and the whole five-week delay was eradicated. This allowed the deck sections to be installed as scheduled. There arose problems with small holes being created in the coating; as these had also been found on the Great Belt Bridge, it was decided that nothing would be done with the issue.

The deck sections were produced by HBG in Schiedam, Netherlands, and transported by Barge to Stord. Each section is 36 meters (118 ft) long and consisted of two welded subsections. They were mounted using the crane ship Uglen, allowing up to nine and an average of four sections to be installed per day and completed in June 2000. The section of the bridge built as a beam bridge on the Føyno side was built by filling in the shallow fjord under the bridge with earthwork, building the bridge and then removing the earthwork again. Construction took 700,000 man-hours and cost NOK 442 million. The bridge was taken into use along with the Bømlafjord Tunnel on 27 December 2000. The bridge allowed, along with the rest of the Triangle Link, four ferry services to terminate.

== Specifications ==
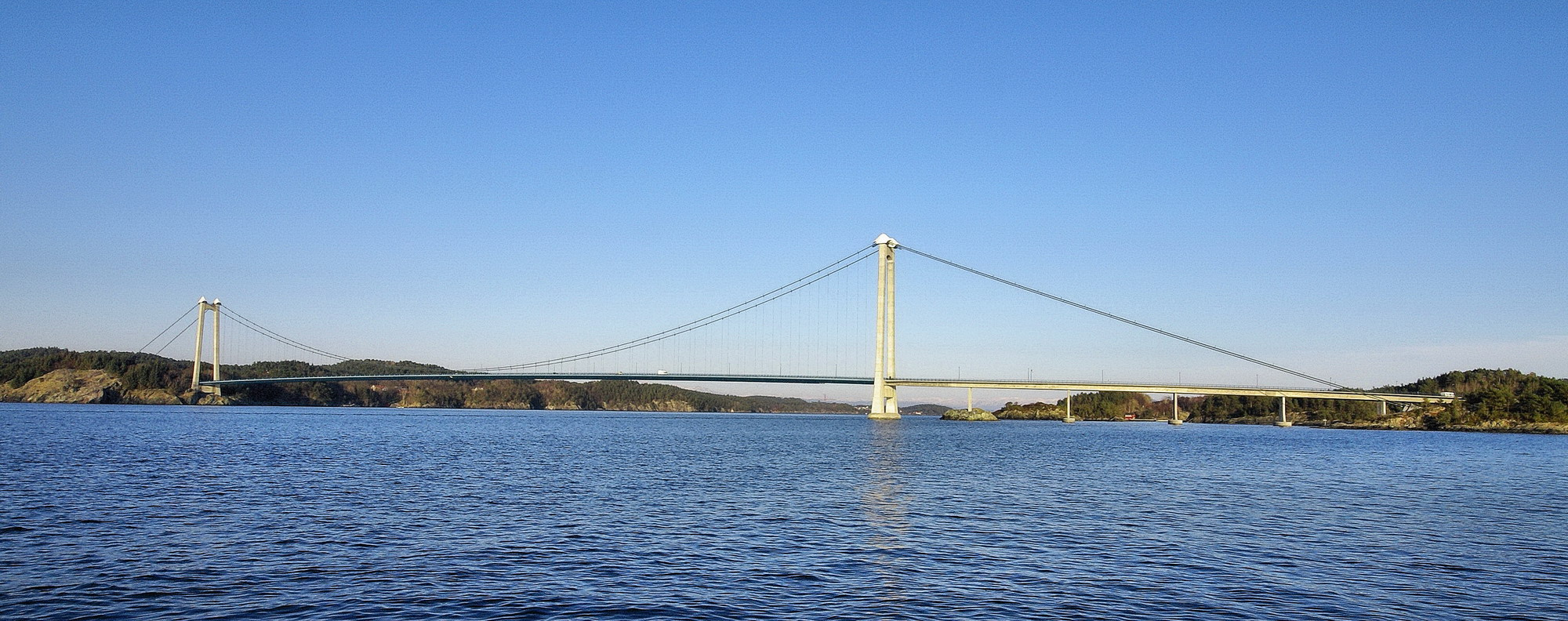
The bridge with Føyno to the right

The Stord Bridge is a 1,077-meter (3,533 ft) long suspension bridge with a 677-meter (2,221 ft) long main span. It carries two lanes of European route E39 and a combined pedestrian and bicycle path across Digernessundet, connecting the islands of Stord and Føyno. The bridge has a width of 13.5 meters (44 ft) and a clearance below of 18 meters (59 ft). It has two concrete pylons, each 97 meters (318 ft) tall, one on Digernesklumpen on Stord, the other on a small islet just off Føyno. The pylons consist of 2,800 cubic meters (99,000 cu ft) of concrete and 700 tonnes (690 long tons; 770 short tons) of steel. The deck between the towers consists of 19 pre-built steel sections, each 36 meters (118 ft) long and 2.6 meters (8 ft 6 in) tall. They are connected to the main suspended cable, which is 360 millimeters (14 in) thick and 1,142 meters (3,747 ft) long, by vertical cables every 12 meters (39 ft). The bridge's vertical curvature has a radius of 11,640 meters (38,190 ft). In 2012, the bridge had an average 5,284 vehicles per day. The bridge was paid off and the tolls removed on 30 April 2013.
