= Triangle Link =

Fixed link of roads and tunnels in Norway

Coordinates: 59.74091°N 5.40510°E

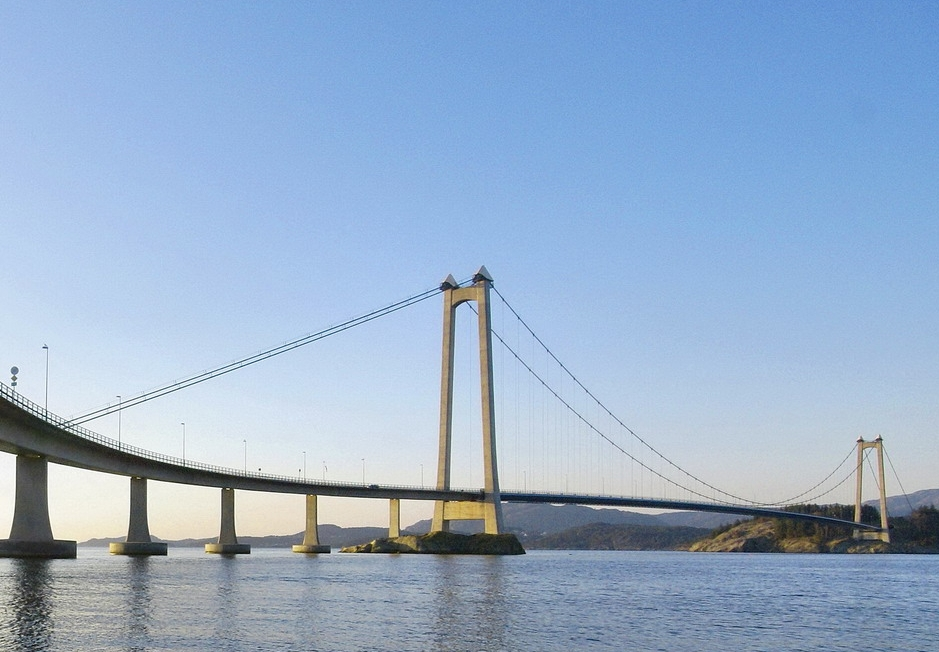
Stord Bridge with Stord in the background

The Triangle Link (Norwegian: Trekantsambandet) is a fixed link with three branches connecting the islands of Stord and Bømlo to each other and the mainland at Sveio, Norway. It consists of the underwater Bømlafjord Tunnel from Sveio to the island of Føyno, the Stord Bridge from there to Stord, and a road including the Bømla Bridge and the Spissøy Bridge to Bømlo. The section from Sveio to Stord is part of European Route E39, while the branch to Bømlo is part of County Road 542.

The Bømlo Tunnel is 7,860 meters (25,790 ft) long and reaches 260 meters (850 ft) below mean sea level. It is the longest subsea tunnel in Norway and was the deepest in the world when it opened. The Stord Bridge and Bømla Bridge are both suspension bridges, with lengths of 1,077 and 998 meters (3,533 and 3,274 ft) and main spans of 677 and 577 meters (2,221 and 1,893 ft). The Spissøy Bridge is a 283-meter (928 ft) beam bridge. The link is 21.5-kilometer (13.4 mi) long toll road with a toll plaza on Føyno. The section from Stord to Bømlo has a pedestrian and bicycle path.

Plans for a link between Bømlo and Stord were first launched as a pontoon bridge in the 1960s. In the late 1980s, the plans evolved into a triangular project. There was controversy surrounding the project, in particular from environmentalists. The Parliament of Norway passed the plans in 1996, and construction started the following year. The bridges and link between Stord and Bømlo opened on 28 December 2000, while the tunnel opened on 30 April 2001. The link cost 1.8 billion Norwegian krone (NOK) after substantial cost overruns and remained a toll road until 30 April 2013.

== Route description ==
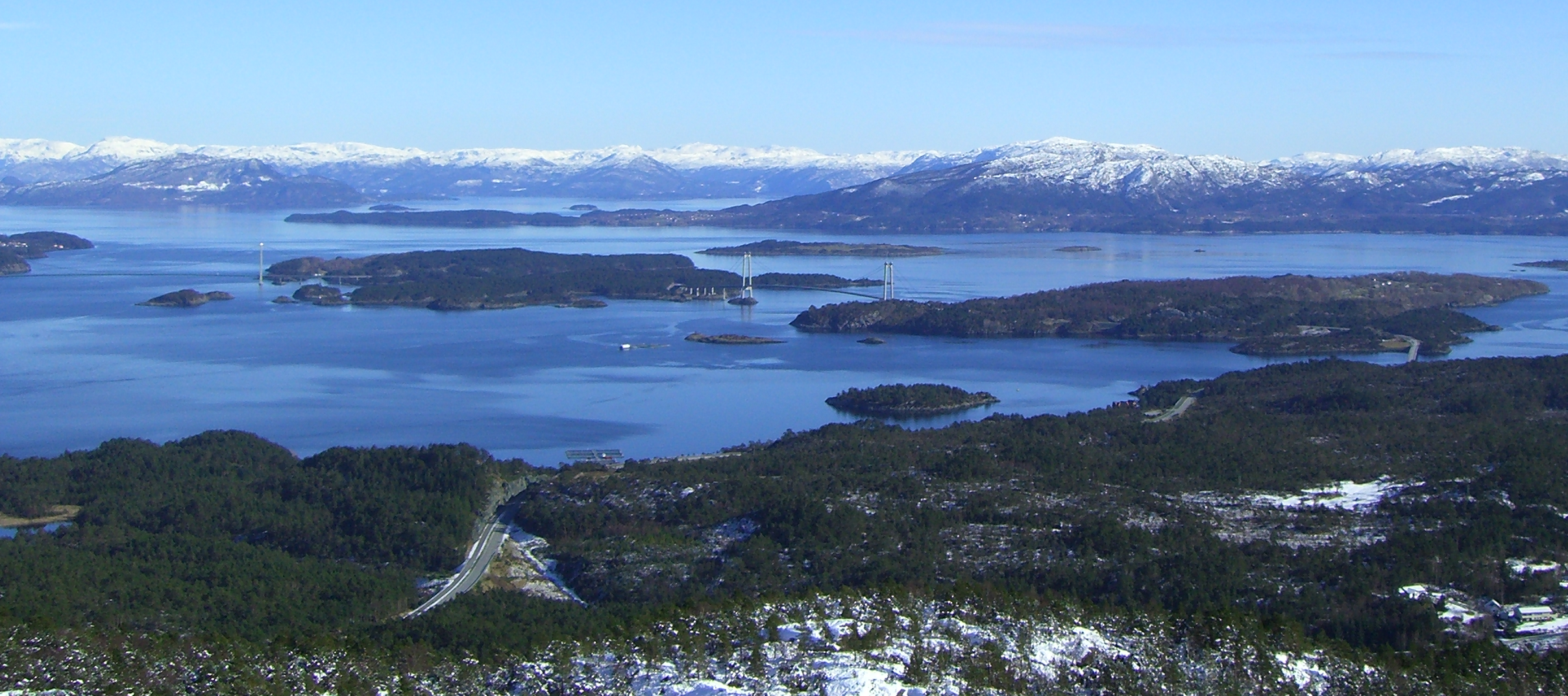
Overview of the Triangle Link, with the Stord Bridge to the left, the Bølmo Bridge in the middle, Spissøy Bridge to the right and the Bølmafjord Tunnel below the fjord up to the right

The Triangle Link is part of two routes, European route E39 and County Road 542. The section from Stord to Sveio, including the Stord Bridge and the Bømlafjord Tunnel, is part of the E39 highway (the Coastal Highway) which runs along the west coast of Norway. The section from the interchange on the island of Føyno, including the Bøla Bridge and the Spissøy Bridge, is on County Road 542. The link acts both as a mainland connection for Stord and Bømlo to the mainland at Sveio, as well as a link between the two island communities, which have a combined population of 30,000.

The Bømlafjord Tunnel is a 7,860-meter (25,790 ft) long subsea tunnel which crosses Bømlafjorden. It is 11 meters (36 ft) wide, 4.7 meters (15 ft) tall and reaches 260.4 meters (854 ft) below mean sea level. The tunnel has three lanes, one downhill and two uphill, with the direction of the extra lane switching at the bottom. When it opened, it was the longest and second-deepest subsea tunnel in Europe. Stord Bridge is a suspension bridge which crosses Digernessundet, connecting Stord with Føyno. It is 1,077 meters (3,533 ft) long and has a main span (distance between the pylons, or towers) of 677 meters (2,221 ft). The bridge is 13.5 meters (44 ft) wide and has a clearance of 18 meters (59 ft). It has two 97-meter (318 ft) tall pylons, one foundationed on Digernesklubben and one on Føyno. The pylons were built in concrete, while the deck is built as 19 in steel sections, each 36 meters (118 ft) long and weighing 150 tonnes (150 long tons; 170 short tons). Stord Bridge has the second-longest span in Norway, after the Askøy Bridge.

A map of the Triangle Link and the ferry services it replaced

Bømla Bridge is a suspension bridge which crosses Spissøysundet, connecting Spissøy and Nautøya. It is 998 meters (3,274 ft) long and has a main span of 577 meters (1,893 ft). The bridge is 13 meters (43 ft) wide and has a clearance of 36 meters (118 ft). The higher clearance was built to allow ship traffic which runs through Nyleia between Bømlo and Stord to continue to run. The bridge has two 105-meter (344 ft) tall pylons, one foundationed on Brunsholmen and one on Spissøy. The bridge has a similar aesthetically design to the Stord Bridge, and also features a steel deck with concrete pylons. It has the fifth-longest span in Norway. Spissøy Bridge is a beam bridge which crosses Gassasundet, connecting Bømlo with Spissøy. It is 283 meters (928 ft) long, consists of five spans and has a clearance of 7 meters (23 ft).

The fixed link project also included 12 kilometers (7.5 mi) of highway. On Stord, E39 received a new two-lane, limited-access road from Meatjørn to the bridge. This included a new grade separated (two-level) interchange in the southern part of Leirvik and a culvert—the Digernes Tunnel—immediately before the bridge. In Sveio, the link included 800 meters (2,600 ft) of new limited-access road from the tunnel to a grade-separated interchange at Dalshovda. In Bømlo, there was a new road built across the islands of Spissøya and Nautøya—including an intersection on Spissøy. It further consisted of a new section of road from the Bømlo side of Spissøy Bridge at Gassasundet to Røyksund, and from Gassasundet to Grøvle, including a new tunnel through Stokkajuvet. A combined pedestrian and bicycle path runs along the whole section between Stord and Bømlo, with a grass division on the land parts between the road and the path. Underpasses and walls were built with natural stone.

The tolls are collected at a toll plaza located on Føyno. The plaza is constructed as a grade-separated intersection, so that any car passes through the plaza once. However, traffic only traveling between Føyno to Bømlo does not have to pay. Cars driving along E39 drive straight ahead through the plaza, while cars to or from Bømlo need to use the interchange. There is also an intersection allowing access to the island. The plaza has six lanes, of which two in each direction have a toll booth and one in each direction has an automatic collection. The toll station uses the Autopass toll collection, which allows passage without stopping, in addition to manual collection. Passengers, pedestrians, bicycles, motorcyclists and mopeds are free. After a restructuring of the toll costs in 2006, the fees were NOK 85 for cars and NOK 270 for trucks, having previously had two separate fees for small and large trucks. Frequent travelers can prepay for at least 40 passings to the toll company, and receive a 40 percent discount. After the down payment was finished in April 2013, the tolls were removed and the roads became free to travel on starting 30 April 2013.

== History ==
=== Pontoon bridge proposals ===
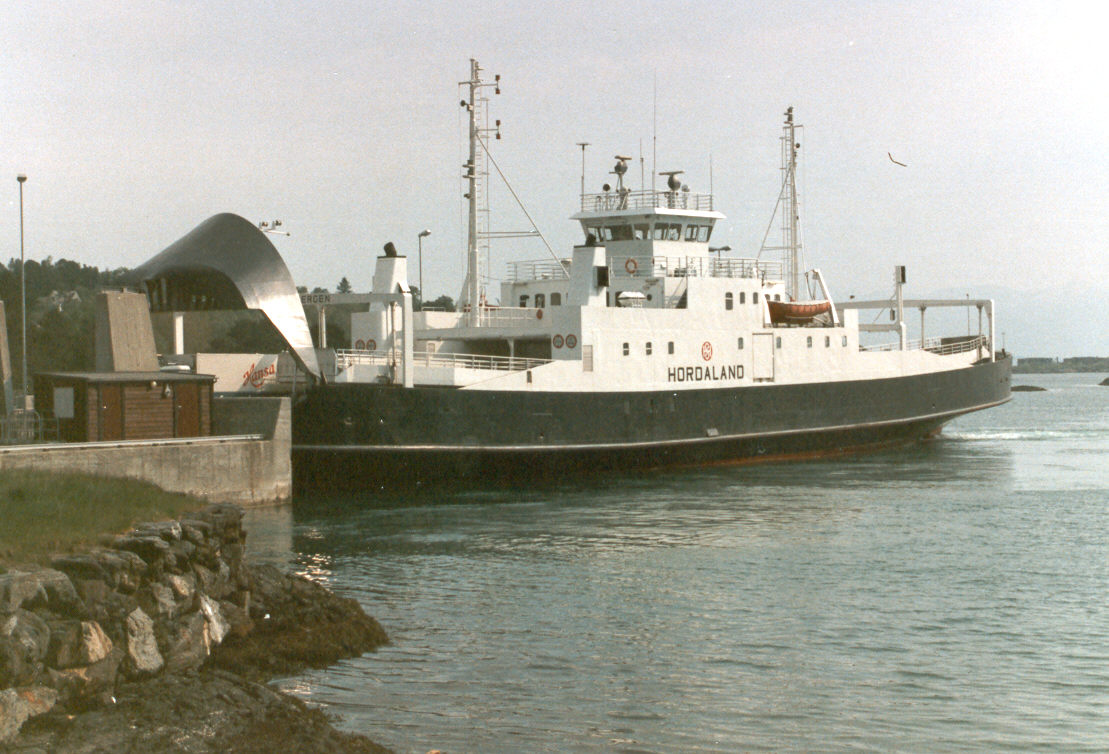
MF Hordaland at Skjersholmane in the early 1990s

The first recorded proposal for a connection between Bømlo and Stord was made in the 1960s by sheriff, and later mayor of Fitjar Municipality, Finn Havnerås. Christened the Island Road, he proposed a series of eleven bridges and causeways which would run from Kalveid in Fitjar Municipality via Brandasund to Rolfsnes in Bømlo. While local politicians were not opposed to the plan, the recent municipal merger between Bømlo Municipality, Bremnes Municipality and Moster Municipality made them prioritize other sectors and the project was abandoned without any official investigations.

A new route was launched by Bømlo Mayor Malvin Meling, who proposed a pontoon bridge which would cross Stokksundet. He was inspired by the plans to build what would become the Nordhordland Bridge north of Bergen. In 1973, the municipal councils of Bømlo, Stord and Fitjar decided to launch a planning process, which concluded that a pontoon bridge between Sørstokken and Foldrøyholmen would be optimal. The report also considered bridges across the Fitjar Archipelago and a crossing via Spissøy and Føyno. There were protests from Wichmann Motorfabrikk who were concerned about their operations if the sound was closed for shipping traffic. Similar protests also came from the shipping industry, who wished to continue using Stokksundet; the protests were not remedied by the plans including a suspension bridge across Foldrøysundet. To illustrate their point, one shipowner let two of his ships cross in the middle of Foldrøysundet. The shipping industry received support from Norwegian Coastal Administration and the plans were abandoned in 1974.

In the early 1980s, plans for Stord Airport, Sørstokken were launched. The bridge plans across Stokksundet were again brought up in 1982 as the industry on Bømlo wanted to not have use a ferry to reach the airport. A committee with representatives from all three municipalities was established in May 1983 to look into the possibilities for a bridge. Led by Bømlo Mayor Arne M. Haldorsen, it issued Engineer Harald Møyner the task to author a report and recommendation. He made three proposals: a pontoon or suspension bridge between Foldrøyhomen and Litlaneset; a suspension bridge between Setraneset and Sokkbleikjo, which would terminate just south of the new airport; and a combined fixed link between Spissøy and Digernes, without passing via the Fitjar Archipelago. The latter was the first time a fixed link to the mainland was proposed. The Norwegian Civil Aviation Administration protested against a possible suspension bridge near the airport, but stated that one closer further away would be fine.

Mapping of traffic patterns on Bømlo was undertaken by Hordaland Public Roads Administration in 1984, and based on this and other feedback, a pontoon bridge between Foldrøyholmen and Sørstokken was recommended. It was estimated to cost NOK 190 million, in addition to auxiliary roads for NOK 40 million. Following the opening of the Vardø Tunnel in 1982, the first subsea tunnel in Norway, Engineer Finn Nitter d.e. proposed a fixed link which involved a combined bridge, road and tunnels between the islands, including a suspension bridge over Digernessundet, a causeway and low bridge onwards to a 2.2-kilometer (1.4 mi) subsea tunnel under Spissøysundet and a low bridge over Gassasundet. In addition, a 7.5-kilometer (4.7 mi) long tunnel would have had to be constructed from Føyno to Ulveråker in Sveio.

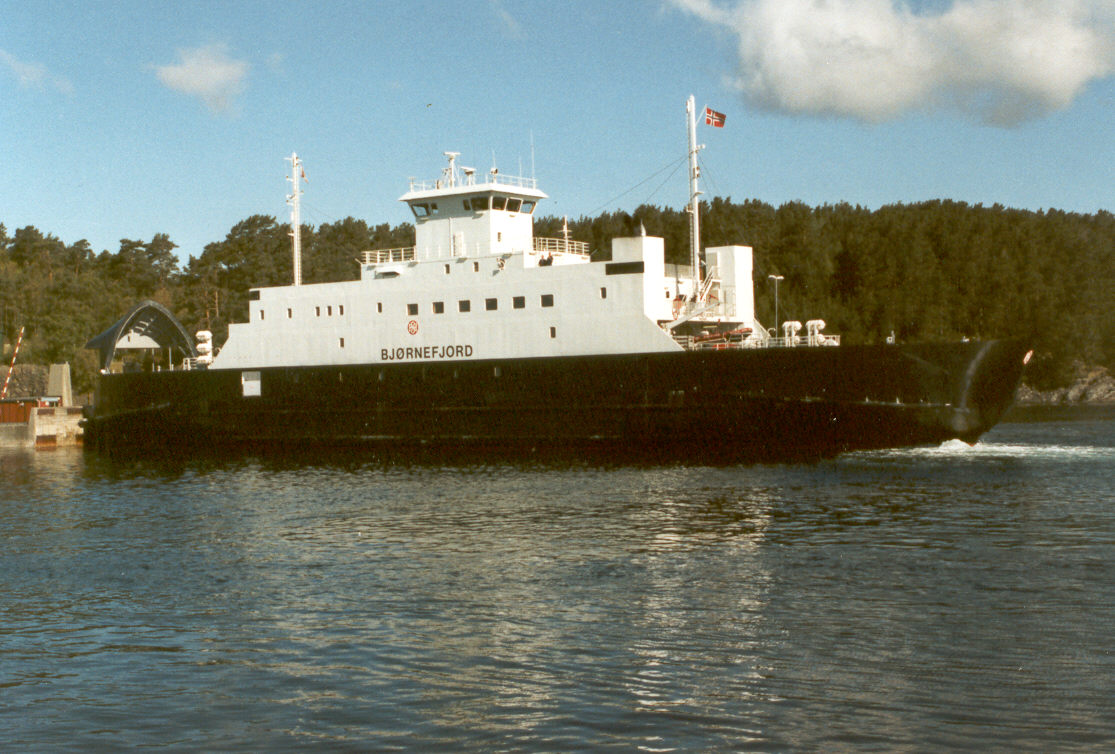
MF Bjørnefjord at Skjersholmane in the late 1990s

The company Johannes Sørlie launched an all-tunnel proposal in 1985, which would cost NOK 700 million and give 18 kilometers (11 mi) of subsea tunnel connecting Bømlo to Stord and the mainland. The committee was positive to the proposals, while Josef Martinsen, director of Hordaland Public Roads Administration, stated that the project was unrealistic. Sveio Municipality was subsequently invited as a member of the planning committee. On 14 May 1985, the committee voted to encourage the municipal councils to pass planning which involved a bridge across Sørstokken, and aimed to get the plans into Norwegian Road Plan 1990–1993. The committee continued its work until it dissolved itself in October 1986 and was replaced by the limited company Ytre Sunnhordland Bru- og Tunnelselskap AS (SBT). The company was owned by the municipalities of Bømlo, Stord, Fitjar and Sveio, Hordaland County Municipality and the banks Bergen Bank, Sparebanken Vest, Vestlandsbanken, Haugesund Bank and Christiania Bank.

A new master plan for the project was completed by the Public Roads Administration in December 1986. It proposed four main routes: via the Fitjar Archipelago; via Foldrøyhamn with a pontoon bridge to Sørstokken; a suspension bridge from Søtreneset to Stokkbleikjo; or via Spissøy, Naustøy and Føyno to Digernes. They recommended choosing the pontoon bridge. SBT stated that this was only to be a first stage, and that a second stage should involve a tunnel to the mainland. In a meetingbetween SBT and representatives for the shipping industry at the end of 1986, it was decided that SBT would start working for a mainland connection that would not hinder sailing.

A report published by SBT in 1987 looked at details for a subsea tunnel to the mainland. It was the first official document to use the "Triangle Link" term, although this had previously been used by the press. A delegation traveled to Washington state in the United States and British Columbia in Canada to look at their seven pontoon bridges, while seismic surveys were undertaken in Bømlafjorden. SBT changed its name to Sunnhordland Bru- og Tunnelselskap and a majority of the board shifted towards being in favor of a fixed link. The issue became the subject of major local debate and was supplemented by a demand from residents in southern Bømlo that they did not want to lose their ferry service, which would be faster than driving via the fixed link.

=== Opposition ===
The Coastal Administration stated that they would not allow a pontoon bridge. SBT decided on 26 June 1987 to work towards receiving permission to collect advanced tolls on the ferry services. On 16 September, they unanimously supported the triangular proposal, which was estimated to cost NOK 660 million. This was criticized by Hordaland Public Roads Administration, who stated that it would take longer time to plan—and thus complete—the Triangle Link. A poll from January 1988 showed that 78.6 percent of the population of Bømlo wanted the Triangle Link, while 8.6 percent wanted the pontoon bridge. On 6 January, SBT started negotiating loans with various banks to receive financial guarantees for the Triangle Link, and by February sufficient funding had been secured.

From 1988, environmentalists started actively opposing the Triangle Link. The most active was the local chapter of the Norwegian Society for the Conservation of Nature, which stated that the road would have serious consequences for the local boat traffic to the recreational islands of Føyno and Nautøy. Instead, they recommended that the municipalities chose a pontoon bridge. An action group was established. Hallgeir Matre stated that Stord had a lack of beaches and that the two islands "were the last low, forested islands in the area after the paradise Eldøyane had been converted to an industrial area for Aker Stord during the 1970s". He further stated that environmentalists were skeptical to floating bridges, but that in this case it would be the lesser of two evils. The Stord Society for the Conservation of Nature applied for municipal grants to make a critical report, but this was rejected by the majority of the municipal council. By June, a new chapter had been established on Bømlo, and the group stated that it was irresponsible to build a link which would result in a massive increase in car use. Future In Our Hands started a petition which collected 1,600 signatures. A poll from 1990 showed that in Stord, 35 percent were in favor of the project, while 36.7 percent were opposed, given that the ferry service was improved, among other things with night ferries and increased comfort.

Another opponent to the project was the Action Committee Against a Hasty Construction of the Triangle Link, who wanted to delay the decision until after the 1991 municipal elections to ensure that the municipal councils had backing in the public. Gisle Tjong was another opponent, who stated that the risk in the project was large and that it was uncertain how long the tolls would last: they could just as well last 60 as 15 years. Instead, he wanted to use advanced tolls and fuel fees, place the income in the bank and then pay the whole fixed link with the accumulated funds. Most of the opposition against the project was from Stord, while in Bømlo there was overwhelming support. However, in southern Bømlo there were concerns that they would lose their ferry, as they would have a much longer rout to Haugesund via the Triangle Link. Some also stated that it was necessary to keep a ferry for people with fear of tunnels.

=== Political processes ===
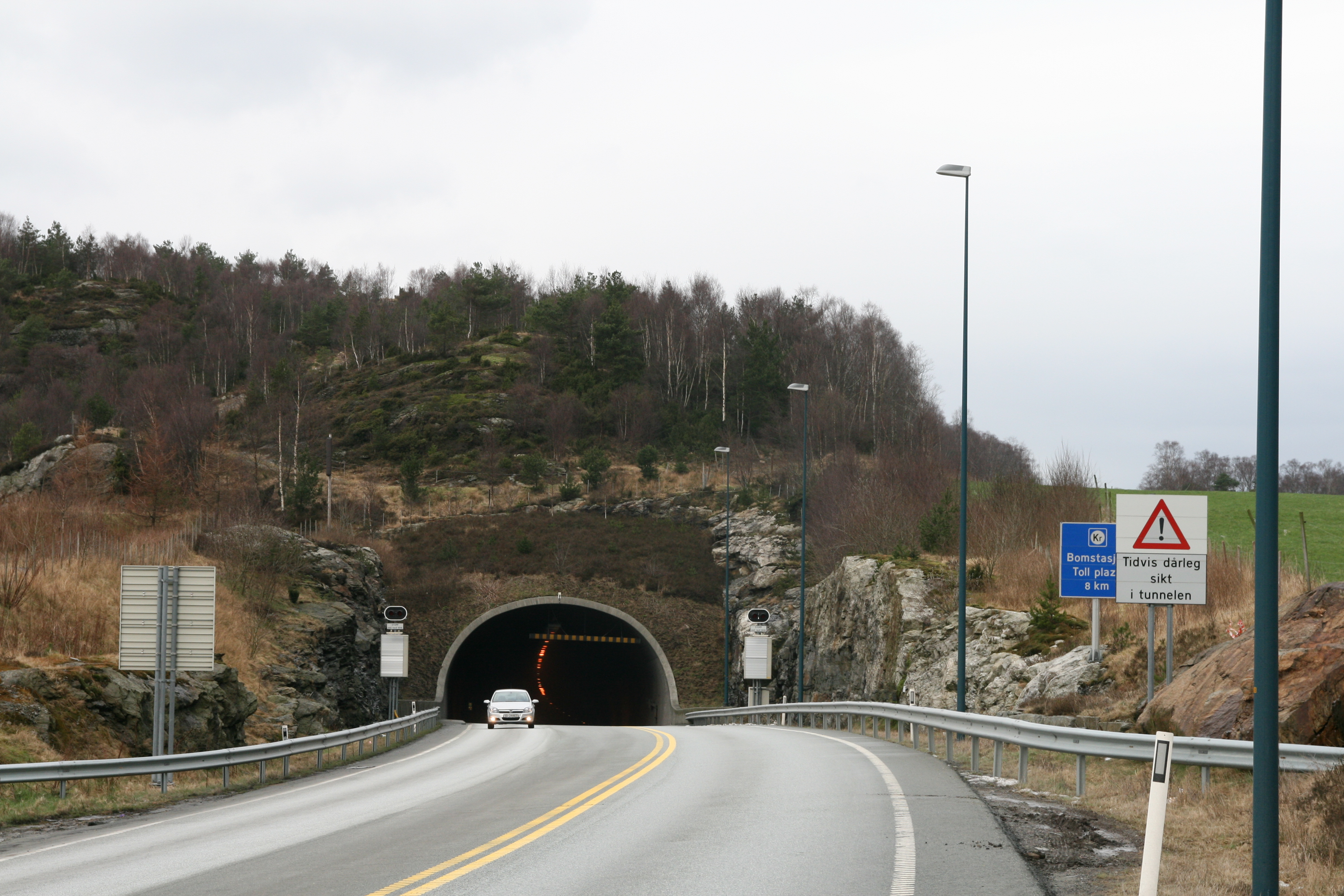
Entrance to the Bømlafjord Tunnel from the mainland

Bømlo Municipal Council voted unanimously in favor of the Triangle Link on 22 February 1988. Two days later, the issue was discussed in Stord Municipal Council. Olav Akselsen at first proposed supporting the pontoon bridge, but after a trial vote he withdrew the proposal and also Stord supported the Triangle Link. The following week, Sveio Municipal Council voted in favor the Triangle Link, without either a debate or dissent in the council. Fitjar Municipal Council voted on 15 March to work with both proposals. Hordaland Public Roads Administration still supported a pontoon bridge, and stated that two and a half years of work on a master plan had been wasted. A new master plan for the Triangle Link was published in early 1989, estimating the costs at NOK 890 million. It recommended that the Langevåg–Buavåg Ferry remain, but the other four ferry services be terminated. The report concluded that the maintenance costs of the fixed link would be lower than the subsidies of the ferry, that the project would be economical of society and would reduce emissions.

During late 1989, advance tolls on the ferries were approved by the municipal councils and the county council, who recommended that collection start from 1 July 1990, but this was not immediately supported by the government. On 18 and 19 September 1990, the Standing Committee on Transport and Communications visited the region and looked at the proposed areas of the Triangle Link, the Hardanger Bridge and the Folgefonna Tunnel. By then it had been established that the Triangle Link would not need state grants, as it could be entirely financed with tolls. Tore Haugen, Conservative parliamentarian from Akershus, proposed that the project be considered independent of the regular national road plans. However, Lars Gunnar Lie, Minister of Transport and Communications from the Christian Democratic Party, stated that he planned a single report to Parliament for all three projects.

In 1991, the master plan was appealed by the Norwegian Society for the Conservation of Nature to the Ministry of Transport and Communications. The appeal was seconded by the Norwegian Directorate for Nature Management. In the 1991 municipal election, the Socialist Left Party was the only party which was opposed to the fixed link, and they received a large increase in votes, increasing for 7 to 21 percent in Stord. The same year, Dag Hareide in the Norwegian Society for the Conservation of Nature started lobbying up towards national politicians in an attempt to stop the issue in Parliament. High-profile people who were opposed to the project included Per Ståle Lønning, Herborg Kråkevik and Kenneth Sivertsen.

The issue of advanced tolls was reviewed by the county council on 23 October 1991, where 64 voted in favor and 19 were opposed, the latter representing the Socialist Left Party, the Red Electoral Alliance and the Progress Party. In June 1992, the county council was asked to prioritize between the Hardanger Bridge and the Triangle Link, as there would not be sufficient state grants to build both projects. Both would require between NOK 200 and 300 million, and it would not be possible to start both projects in the period from 1994 to 1997. In the council meeting on 18 June 1992, a proposal to waiver prioritization was rejected. The council then, with 44 against 30 votes, chose to prioritize the Hardanger Bridge, which received most votes from the Labour and Centre Party. The Conservative Party was the only party for which all the votes were cast in favor of the Triangle Link. The Socialist Left Party's proposal to build neither received 11 votes.

In July, the master plan was passed by the Council of State. On 10 December 1992, Parliament approved advanced payment of tolls on the ferry, which were made effective from 1 January 1993. Ticket prices increased with between NOK 10 and 12. This resulted in protests from the ferry employees who stated that they would have to collect the tolls which would remove their jobs; Norwegian Seafarers' Union representatives stated that they considered suing the state. Work on the development plan started in 1992. It included safety and environmental improvements which increased the project's cost by NOK 200 million. In May 1994, it was made subject to consultative statements.

Norwegian Road Plan 1994–97 was considered by Parliament during 1993. Minister of Transport and Communications, Kjell Opseth of the Labour Party, stated that he wanted to equally prioritize the Triangle Link and the Hardanger Bridge, but that it would be unrealistic to build both in the same period. At a county council meeting on 21 April 1993, the council decided with 60 against 20 votes that the county would not prioritize between the two projects. Opseth subsequently stated that in his opinion, the Triangle Link should be prioritized. In 1995, a report on the Coastal Highway (E39) was presented, which recommended that the Skjersholmane–Valevåg Ferry be removed.

Particularly within the Labour Party there was disagreement about whether or not to build the Hardanger Bridge. In addition to crossing the Hardangerfjord, there were concerns that the bridge would increase the traffic through Hardangervidda National Park, and that it subsequently would result in an all-year road being built with subsequent negative impact on nature and wildlife. Prime Minister Gro Harlem Brundtland of the Labour Party stated on 10 October 1995 that the government was in favor of the Triangle Link and opposed to the Hardanger Bridge.

When the standing committee visited the two projects in 1996, they were met by demonstrators in favor of the bridge in Hardanger, and demonstrators in opposition to the fixed link in Sunnhordland. In May, SBT proposed building a culvert on Digernes as a compromise for a proposal from the Labour Party and the Christian Democratic Party to consider other solution, which could have postponed the project several years. Parliament decided on 11 June 1996, with 144 against 20 votes, to build the Triangle Link. The Folgefonna Tunnel was also passed, while the Hardanger Bridge was put aside.

=== Construction ===
Construction started on 15 February 1997. Before the first blast could be taken by County Mayor Magnar Lussand, representatives for Vestlandet Nature and Youth, and The People's Movement Against the Triangle Link had to be moved. The only police officer at the festivities was Sheriff Reidar Færestrand, who was not dressed in his police uniform and had not brought with him his badge. The demonstrators did not move until a police boat had been sent with the necessary documentation and Færestrand could prove his identity as a law enforcer. Elin Lerum Boasson of Nature and Youth stated that it was "a day of sorrow".

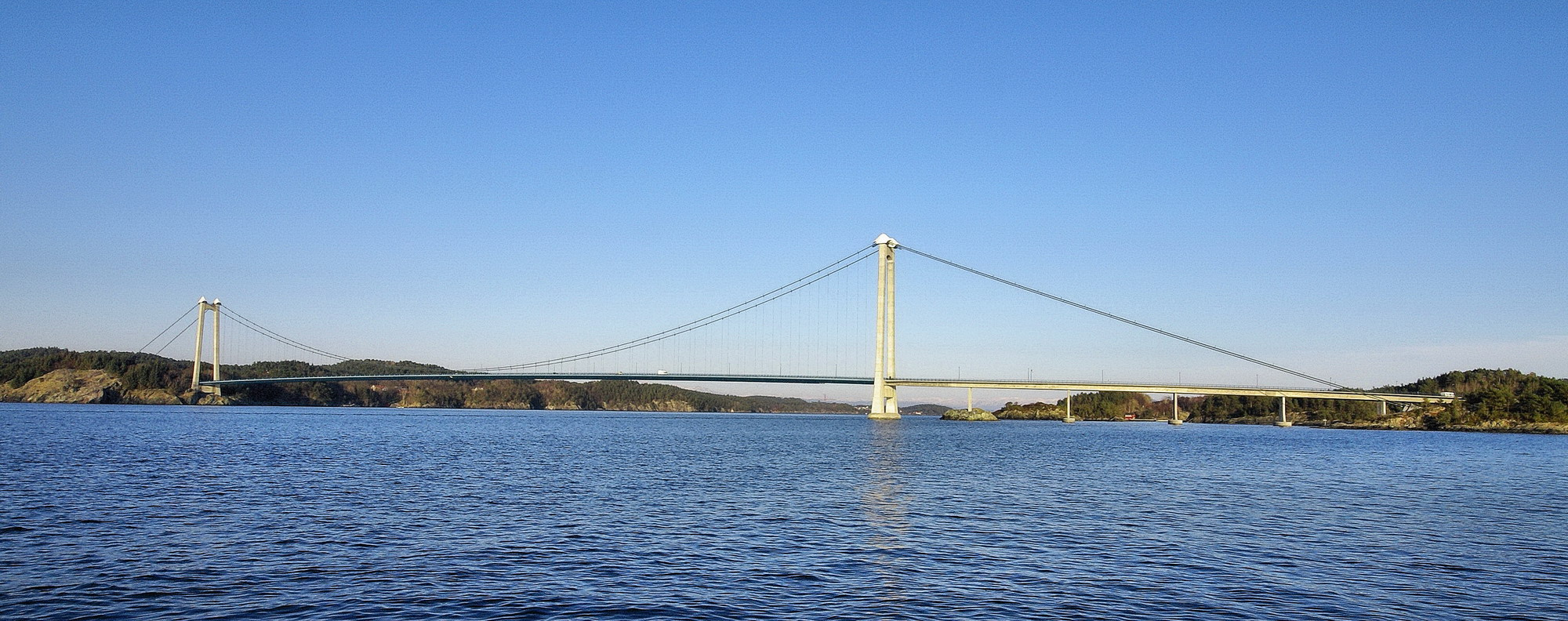
Stord Bridge with Stord to the left

Core samples showed that the tunnel would have to be built 30 meters (98 ft) deeper than originally planned to avoid deposits. The tunneling was undertaken by NCC Eeg-Henriksen from the Føyno side and by the Norwegian Public Roads Administration from the Sveio side. Construction from Sveio started on 16 September 1997 and from Føyno on 6 March 1998. The tunnel was built at an average speed of 55 meters (180 ft) per week, with the record being 96.7 meters (317 ft). The lowest point was reached on 5 May 1999 and the breakthrough took place on 2 September, five months before schedule. Sixty people participated in a course to master fear of tunnels organized by the toll company. When it opened, the tunnel was the longest and second-deepest subsea tunnel in Europe and Norway, after the Hitra Tunnel.

The Stord and Bømla Bridges were both constructed using the same method and by the same contractors, Arbeidsfellesskapet Triangle Contractor, a joint venture between NCC Eeg-Henriksen and HBG Steel Structures. Construction started on the Stord Bridge on 20 February 1999. After the pylons were completed, two catwalks were erected between them, with the constructors choosing a continual catwalk instead of three separate ones. The cables were spun on-site using a reel; this also allowed for cost savings, as the reels could be used two times. The cables were spun using the air spinning with controlled tension, which allowed spinning with little space use and with a crew with limited experience with spinning. The two bridges were the first time that on-site spinning was used in Norway. The fastening poles were delivered five weeks after schedule; a new mounting method was developed which allowed them to be installed in a quarter of the time, in part by using a helicopter, and the whole five-week delay was eradicated. This allowed the deck sections to be installed as scheduled. The decks were produced in Schiedam, Netherlands, for the Stord Bridge and in Italy for the Bømlo Bridge. These were sent by barge to Sunnhordland. The section length was different between the two bridges, the Stord Bridge having them in lengths of 36 meters (118 ft) and the Bømla Bridge in sections of 24 meters (79 ft). This was to accommodate the latter's smaller vertical curvature.

The entire project cost NOK 1,814 million. The costs were distributed to NOK 476 million for the Bømlafjord Tunnel, NOK 433 million for the Stord Bridge, NOK 336 million for the Bømla Bridge, NOK 46 million for the Spissøy Bridge, NOK 36 million for the Digernes Tunnel, NOK 325 million for roadways and NOK 172 for administration and common costs. The investment cost was split between state grants and NOK 1,036 million in debt taken up by the toll company. When the project was passed by Parliament it had a budget of NOK 1,260 million. The Office of the Auditor General of Norway criticized the Western Norway Public Roads Administration in 2001 for a total cost overrun of NOK 900 million in three projects, the Triangle Link, the Lærdal Tunnel and parts of National Road 555. The majority of the cost overruns were tied to the Triangle Link. As a consequence, Minister of Transport Torild Skogsholm stated that future large road investments would have an external quality assurance before being presented to Parliament.

=== Opening and operation ===
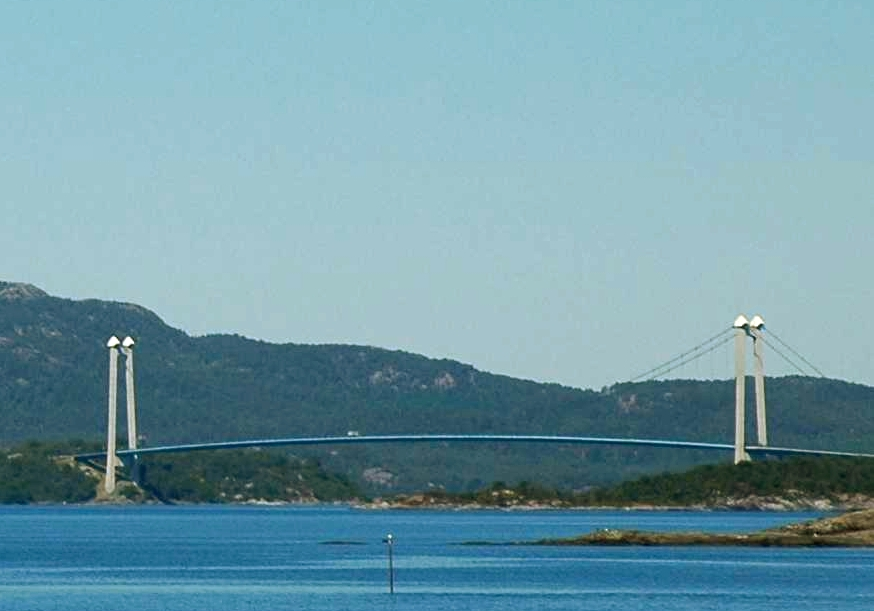
Bømla Bridge

The first part of the link, between Stord and Sveio, including the Stord Bridge and Bømlafjord Tunnel, was taken into use on 27 December 2000. The official opening and the National Road 542 opening took place on 30 April 2001. The opening of the first stage allowed two ferry services to be replaced, the Skjersholmane–Valevåg Ferry, which connected Stord to Sveio, and the Skjersholmane–Utbjoa Ferry, which connected Stord to Vindafjord Municipality. With the opening of the Bømlo connection, the two remaining ferries could be closed: the Sagvåg–Siggjarvåg Ferry, which connected Stord with Bømlo, and the Mosterhamn–Valevåg Ferry, which connected Bømlo to Sveio. The Langevåg–Buavåg Ferry, which connects the southern part of Bømlo to Sveio, was not closed. In 2000, the four closed ferry services transported 884,216 vehicles and 1,935,875 people.

From the start the toll plaza used Autopass, a standard which allows automatic passage through the toll plaza without stopping. The system was launched by the Norwegian Public Roads Administration in 2001 and the Triangle Link was the first to take the system into use. The tollway was also the first in the country to allow subscriptions to be made via the Internet. The initial charges were NOK 75 for cars up to 3.5 tonnes (3.4 long tons; 3.9 short tons) or 6.0 meters (19.7 ft) length, NOK 225 for small trucks, between 6.0 and 12.4 meters (19.7 and 40.7 ft), and NOK 450 for longer vehicles.

In 2004 the Public Roads Administration published a report documenting high administration costs in the 46 toll companies throughout the country. Along with the company for the Osterøy Bridge, SBT received the harshest criticism in the report. Especially a trip made by Chairman Harry Herstad and his wife to San Francisco to participate at a conference was criticized, as it cost the toll company NOK 118,000. Also annual board member fees of NOK 200,000 and excessive trips for the board were commented as wasted money. The internal audit concluded with that there were costs of NOK 300,000 in 2002 and 2003 which were not properly documented or were not used in line with regulations. The report was rejected by the board, who claimed that several of the issues were misunderstandings and that the Public Roads Administration was using the report in a campaign to establish a state-run toll collection agency. Øyvind Halleraker withdrew as managing director of SBT and as chairman of the Norwegian Road Financing Companies Association in January 2005. He was at the time also member of parliament for the Conservative Party.

As a consequence of the report, Hordaland County Municipality demanded an extraordinary annual meeting be held in February, in which chairman Harry Herstad was replaced. Pål Kårbø was elected new chairman. At the same time the annual meeting demanded that the company withdraw from its various tasks related to establishing toll projects on Bølmo and Halsnøya as well as administrative work of the Norwegian Road Financing Companies Association. In a 2007 report from the Public Roads Administration, SBT was one of seven toll companies which was criticized for too high administration costs. The toll changed the operator of the toll plaza from Bru- og Tunnelselskapet to Vegamot in 2010. The same year the toll plaza had 1,910,280 passing vehicles and a revenue of NOK 142 million. This made it the ninth-largest toll road in Norway by revenue. The toll collection was scheduled to be completed on 30 April 2013.
