= Aas-Jakobsen =

Norwegian engineering company

Dr. ing. A. Aas-Jakobsen AS, trading as Aas-Jakobsen, is a civil engineering consultant company specializing in structural engineering. The company is based in Oslo, Norway, and primarily works with bridges, roads, railways, offshore oil and buildings. The company has 250 employees. The company was established by Andreas Aas-Jakobsen (1905–1980) in 1937. For the first decade, the company specialized in shell structures, but from the 1950s, the company shifted to bridge design. The company later started designing offshore installations and became a verifier for such structures, and later also became a consultant for railway projects and major road projects, such as the Bjørvika Tunnel through Oslo.

Major projects which the company has participated in include the Arctic Cathedral, Askøy Bridge, Bømla Bridge, Brønnøysund Bridge, Candaba Viaduct, Djupfjordstraumen Bridge, Drammen Bridge, Grenland Bridge, Heidrun, Helgeland Bridge, Henningsvær Bridge, Lysefjord Bridge, Mjøsa Bridge, Nordhordland Bridge, Osterøy Bridge, Rama III Bridge, Sleipner A, Stord Bridge, Tromsø Bridge and Varodden Bridge. New design for yet unbuilt projects include the Storfjord Bridge, which would, if it was completed, become the longest spanned suspension bridge in the world, spanning 2,300 meters (7,500 ft) across Storfjorden. The company is also part of the team which will design Terminal 2 of Oslo Airport, Gardermoen, and an 8-kilometer (5.0 mi) long bicycle tube in Bodø, which would allow bicyclists to ride during winter without exposure to the elements.
