= Hareid =

Hareid may refer to:

== Places ==
- Hareid Municipality, a municipality in Møre og Romsdal county, Norway
- Hareid (village), a village within Hareid Municipality in Møre og Romsdal county, Norway
- Hareid Church, a church in Hareid Municipality in Møre og Romsdal county, Norway
- Hareid Island, or Hareidlandet, an island in Møre og Romsdal county, Norway

== Other ==
- Hareid IL, a multi-sports club from Hareid Municipality in Møre og Romsdal county, Norway

== See also ==
- Hareide
