= Hareide =

Hareide is a Norwegian surname. Notable people with the surname include:

- Åge Hareide (1953–2025), Norwegian football player and manager
- Bodolf Hareide (born 1937), Norwegian politician
- Dag Hareide (born 1949), Norwegian humanist and writer
- Einar Hareide (politician) (1899–1983), Norwegian politician
- Einar Hareide (designer) (born 1959), Norwegian industrial designer
- Gustav Hareide (born 1950), Norwegian politician
- Jorunn Hareide (born 1940), Norwegian literary historian
- Knut Arild Hareide (born 1972), Norwegian politician
