= Storfjord Bridge =

Proposed bridge in Norway

Storfjord Bridge Storfjordbrua
- Coordinates: 62°26′N 6°35′E
- Crosses: Storfjorden

Characteristics
- Longest span: 2,300 metres (7,500 ft)

The Storfjord Bridge (Norwegian: Storfjordbrua) is a proposed suspension bridge that would span the Storfjorden in Sunnmøre, Norway. If built, it would be 3,600 metres (11,800 ft) long and have a main span of 2,300 metres (7,500 ft). This would make it the longest spanned bridge in the world, easily surpassing the 1915 Çanakkale Bridge, which has a main span of 2,023 metres (6,637 ft). The plans have been developed by Aas-Jakobsen for a Storfjordsambandet, a company which aims to toll finance the bridge. According to Rolf M. Larssen of Aas-Jakobsen, there is a larger challenge securing sufficient funding than technically building the bridge. It is estimated to cost 4.3 billion Norwegian krone.

== History ==
In a report made by Aas-Jakobsen, two crossings were discussed, one slightly in-fjord from the ferry and one which would cross from Sykkylven Municipality to Ålesund Municipality. The bridge would have a single main cable and a split bridge beam. The cable would run down the centre of the bridge, with the lanes on each side of an open area with cross-sections. While this method is more expensive, it allows for a more aerodynamic bridge. The bridge would have two pylons, with the road lanes crossing on the outside of the pylons. Each pylon would be 320 metres (1,050 ft) tall. The pylons would be round with a diameter of between 20 and 40 metres (66 and 131 ft). The northern pylon would be anchored in bedrock, while the southern pylon would be anchored in a caisson in bedrock, located 25 metres (82 ft) below mean sea level. The distance between the middle of the lanes would be 41 metres (135 ft) at the pylons, and 15 metres (49 ft) at the middle of the bridge. The main cable would be 315 metres (1,033 ft) above the sea at the pylons and 90 metres (300 ft) above the sea at the middle. The bridge allows a clearance below of 70 metres (230 ft), 500 metres (1,600 ft) wide.

The crossing would establish a fixed link for Sykkylven Municipality and Stranda Municipality to Ålesund Municipality. The service is currently operated by the Ørsneset–Magerholm Ferry on National Road 60, which had an average daily traffic of 1967 cars and 175 in 2009, making it the fifth-most trafficked ferry service in Norway. Former proposals for the crossing has included a submerged floating tunnel and a pontoon bridge, although both have since been discarded. The design is part of a project initiated by the Norwegian Public Roads Administration to develop extreme technology which would make it possible to make E39, the Coastal Highway, ferry free.

Official plans by the Road Administration have suggested that a different bridge, Sulafjord Bridge, over Sulafjorden further west to be built instead of the Storfjord Bridge. This bridge is still of a similar size.

== See also ==
- List of longest suspension bridge spans
- European route E39
