= Norwegian County Road 542 =

Road in Vestland county, Norway

Coordinates: 61°34′17″N 5°26′15″E

County Road 542
- Bokmål: Fylkesvei 542; Nynorsk: Fylkesveg 542

Route information
- Maintained by Western Norway Public Roads Administration
- Length: 19.7 km (12.2 mi)

Major junctions
- East end: E39
- Fv541
- West end: Stavlandsvegen

Location
- Country: Norway
- Counties: Vestland

Highway system
- Roads in Norway; National Roads; County Roads
← Fv541	→ Fv543

County Road 542 (Norwegian: Fylkesvei 542) is a 19.7 kilometers (12.2 mi) long county road in Vestland county, Norway. The road is located in Stord Municipality and Bømlo Municipality. It connects the islands of Bømlo to the island of Føyno in Stord Municipality via part of the Triangle Link. County Road 542 contains two mayor bridges, the Bømla Bridge and Spissøy Bridge.

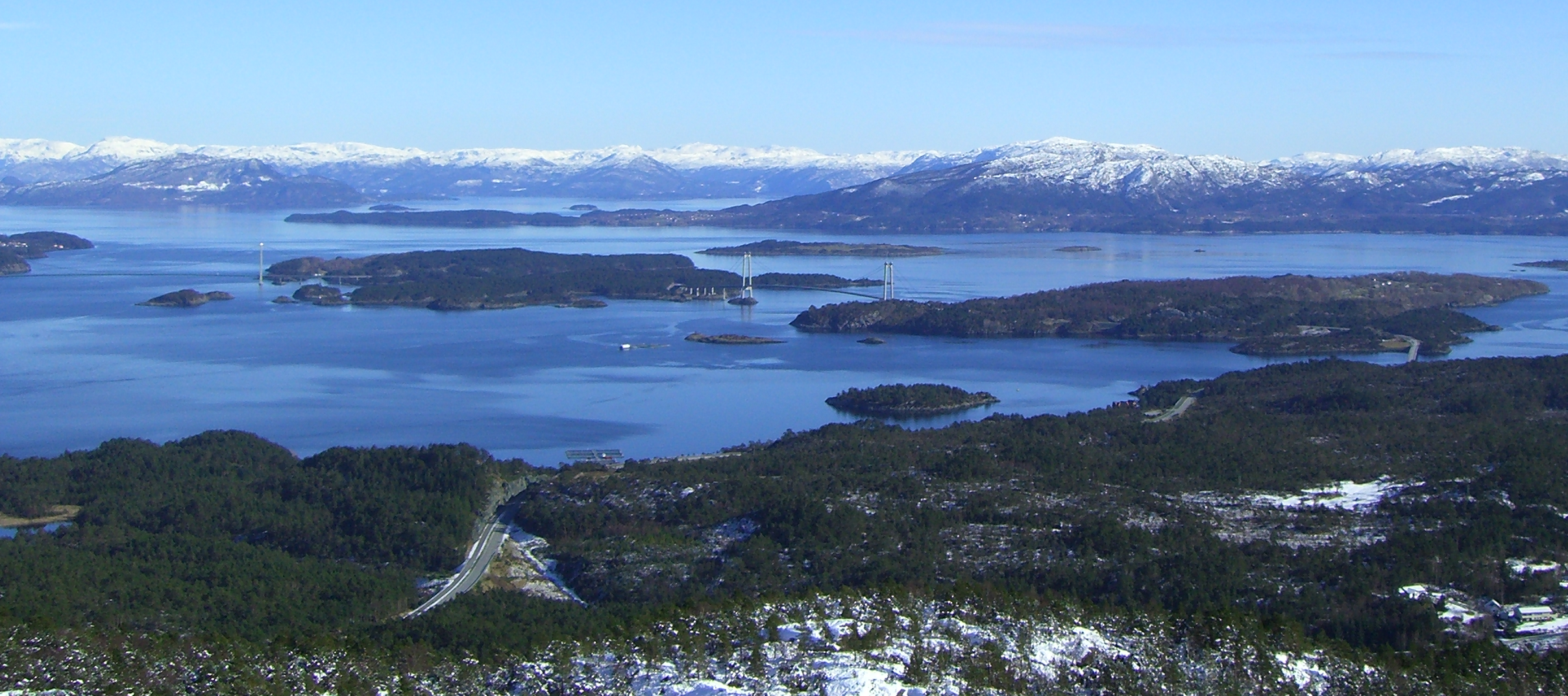
The easternmost part of the road is part of the Triangle Link.

== History ==
Before 1 January 2010, the route was a Norwegian national road, known as National Road 542 (Riksvei 542). It was redesignated a county road after the regional reform of national roads.
