= Harry Herstad =

Norwegian civil servant, sports administrator and politician

Harry Herstad (12 August 1946 – 2 May 2017) is a Norwegian civil servant, sports administrator and politician for the Labour Party.

He was born and grew up in Bergen. He served as organizational director of Nordland County Municipality and Rogaland County Municipality, but is however best known for his work in his home county Hordaland, where he was managing director of Sunnhordland kraftlag before a stint as managing director of SK Brann from 1998 to 1999. He was also chief administrative officer of Stord Municipality and Hordaland County Municipality, and dean of Stord/Haugesund University College. From 2015 to his unexpected death in May 2017 he served as an elected politician, as mayor of Stord.
