= Mosterhamn–Valevåg Ferry =

Map of the Triangle Link and the ferries it replaced

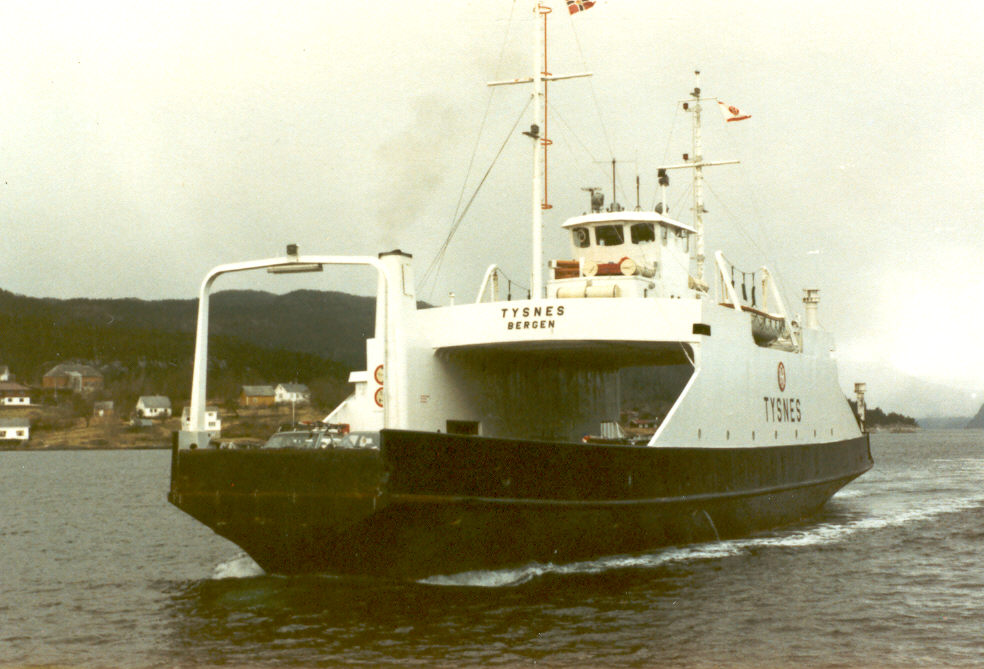
MF Tysnes, the last ferry to operate the route

Mosterhamn–Valevåg Ferry was an automobile ferry which connected the islands of Bømlo Municipality to the mainland in Sveio Municipality. The route was operated by Hardanger Sunnhordlandske Dampskipsselskap (HSD) and ran between Mosterhamn on Bømlo to Valevåg on the mainland. In 2000 the ferry transported 89,815 vehicles and 198,313 passengers.

The original route to the mainland ran from Moster to Tjernagel. On 22 July 1959, the route was moved from the port of Mosterhamn to a new quay further out. From 1 July 1975, the quay was moved from Tjernagel to Valevåg. The last ferry to operate on the route was MF Tysnes, which had a capacity for 40 cars and 162 passengers. The ferry was terminated on 30 April 2001 with the opening of the Triangle Link.
