= Sagvåg–Siggjarvåg Ferry =

Map of the Triangle Link and the ferries it replaced

The Sagvåg–Siggjarvåg Ferry was an automobile ferry which connected the islands of Bømlo (in Bømlo Municipality) and Stord (in Stord Municipality). The route was operated by Hardanger Sunnhordlandske Dampskipsselskap (HSD) and ran between Siggjarvåg on Bømlo to Sagvåg on Stord. In 2000 the ferry transported 254,325 vehicles and 534,259 passengers.

The route was started by Ole Folgerø Holm and Halvard Halderaker with the ferry Peik between Sagvåg and Rubbestadneset. The following year, a stop at Siggjarvåg was included. With a new ferry, Aspøy, in 1957, the ferry could take a single car. This ferry remained in use until 1960. From 1 November 1962, the route was taken over by HSD, and the following year a new quay was built at Siggjarvåg. The last ferry to operate was MF Ølen, which had a capacity for 73 cars and 310 passengers. The ferry was terminated on 30 April 2001 with the opening of the Triangle Link.
