= Skjersholmane–Utbjoa Ferry =

Map of the Triangle Link and the ferries it replaced

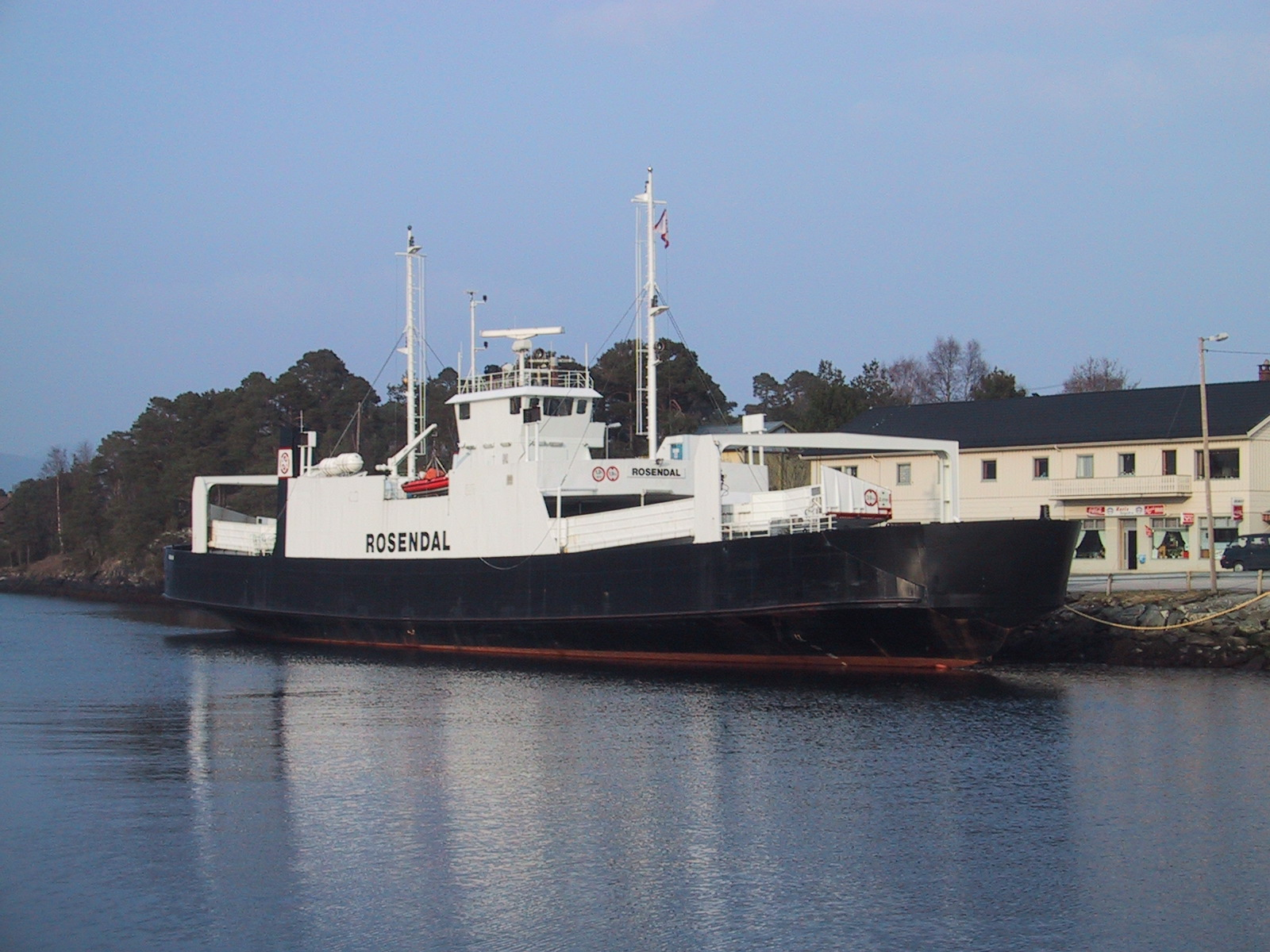
MF Rosendal, the last ferry to operate the route, depicted in 2002

Skjersholmane–Utbjoa Ferry was an automobile ferry which connected the island of Stord to the mainland in Vindafjord Municipality. The route was operated by Hardanger Sunnhordlandske Dampskipsselskap and ran between Skjersholmane on the island of Stord to the village of Utbjoa on the mainland. The last ferry to operate the route was MF Rosendal, which had a capacity for 50 cars and 260 passengers. The route was terminated from 27 December 2000, when the Bømlafjord Tunnel, part of the Triangle Link, opened. In 2000 the ferry transported 59,974 vehicles and 133,857 passengers.
