= Dag Hareide =

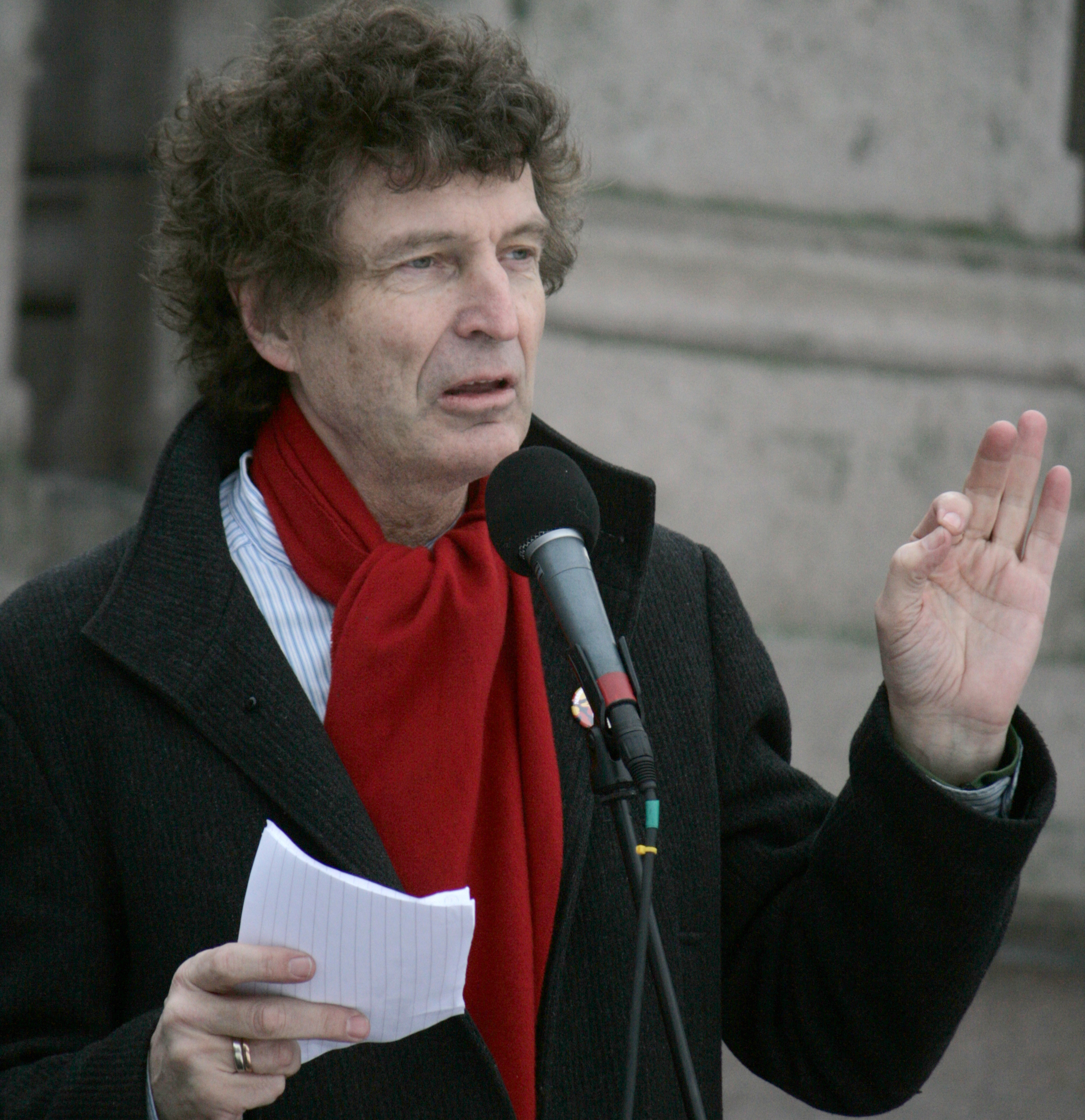
Dag Hareide (2011)

Dag Hareide (born 24 February 1949) is an organizational leader and author. He was knighted in the First Order of St. Olav by the King of Norway in 2015 for exceptional engagement in social innovation in civil society. He has been director of Rainforest Foundation Norway (2012–2015), one of the largest rainforest organizations in the world, Director of Nansen Academy Norway, the Norwegian Humanistic Academy which included the Nansen Center for Peace and Dialogue (2006–2012) and of other folk high schools, Chair of Nordic Forum for Mediation and Conflict Management (2002–2006) which gathered conflict mediators from the five Nordic countries. Curriculum developer in conflict management at the Norwegian Police University College, General Secretary of Oslo City Mission, a comprehensive diaconal institution, Chair of the Namibia Association of Norway, which was a leading NGO in Europe in support for SWAPO, the liberation movement for Namibia. Rehabilitation Coordinator for United Nations Emergency Office during the famine in Ethiopia (1985–1988) and returned later to coordinate and write the first five-year National Disaster Preparedness Plan in Ethiopia for the Ethiopian Government (1996–1998) General secretary of Friends of the Earth Norway, the largest environmental organization in Norway (1990–1995). He has also worked as journalist, pastor, teacher at high schools and University Colleges, initiated several campaigns and associations working for solidarity, dialogue and protection of the environment. He was member of the National Sustainability commission which had the prime minister, four other ministers and the leaders of employers and employees organisations as member. Hareide represented the environmental movement. He served as vice chair of the National Value Commission (Verdikommisjonen) which was formed by the Norwegian Prime Minister, and member of the Commission that formulated the objectives for the Norwegian School system (Bostadutvalget) https://www.gd.no/nyheter/lager-ny-formalsparagraf-i-skolen/s/1-934610-2342653. He chaired the first official dialogue between all faith and life stand communities in Norway. He has a Doctorate in Sociology (Magistergrad) from University of Oslo on the topic of vulnerability and preparedness in famine, and studies in religion, intellectual history, mass media, agriculture and statistics from different Universities and University Colleges in US and Norway.

== Partial bibliography ==
- Chile- the Third Road to Socialism, in Norwegian (Pax Forlag 1973)
- Vulnerability to Famine (Alternative Future 1991) Doctoral thesis (Magistergrad)
- Good Norway? A road to a human future in Norwegian? in Norwegian (Gyldendal Forlag 1991) Discusses the development of life quality in Norwegian history as compared and contrasted with economic growth.
- Nature Wise. A handbook in everyday environmental work. in Norwegian (Gyldendal Forlag 1996) Gives practical advice for how to decrease pollution and destruction of nature in family life. Non-fiction bestseller that year.
- Conflict Mediation. A Nordic Perspective (Scandinavian Academic Press 2006) Summarize experience from 300 conflict mediators in Nordic countries within areas such as family, school, court system, organization and community life.
- What is humanism in Norwegian (Universitetsforlaget 2011) Defines humanism from European intellectual history as well as compared with Chinese, Muslim and some African typoes of humanism. Was written when "humanism" became part of the value paragraph in the Norwegian Constitution.
- Humans and the technopowers (Aschehoug 2020) a book about the break-through technologies in the 21st Century within biotechnology and information technology and its consequences for humans body, mind and society.
