= Skjersholmane–Valevåg Ferry =

Ferry route in Norway

Map of the Triangle Link and the ferries it replaced

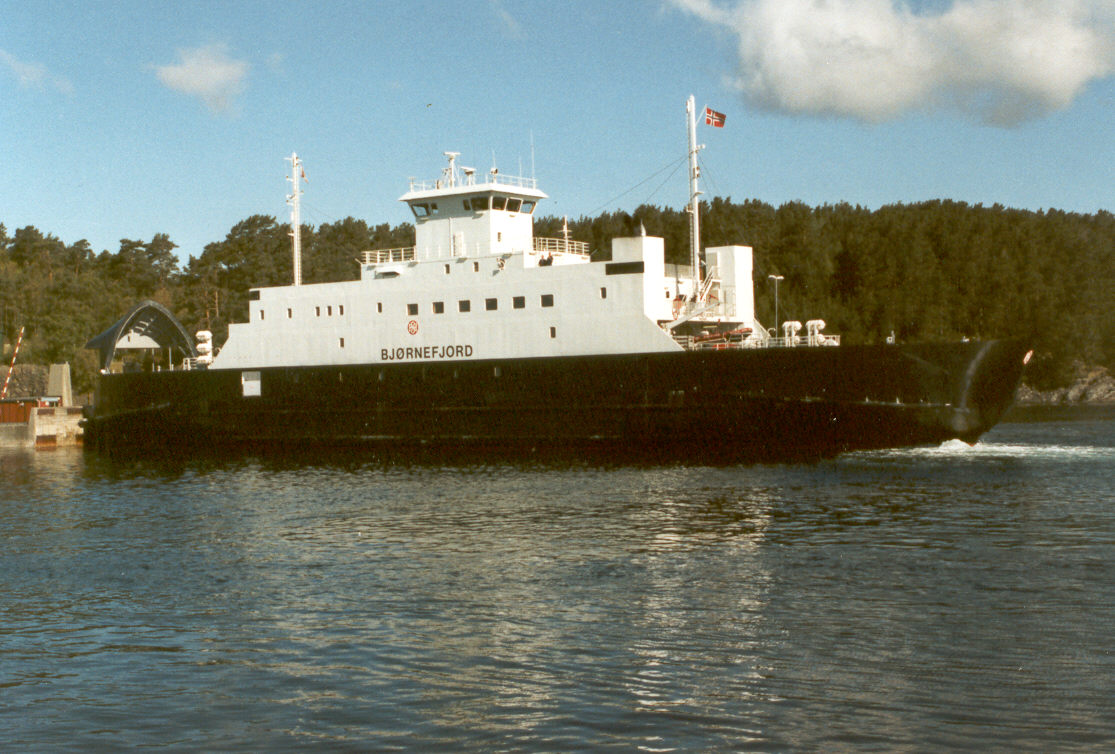
MF Bjørnefjord at Skjersholmane

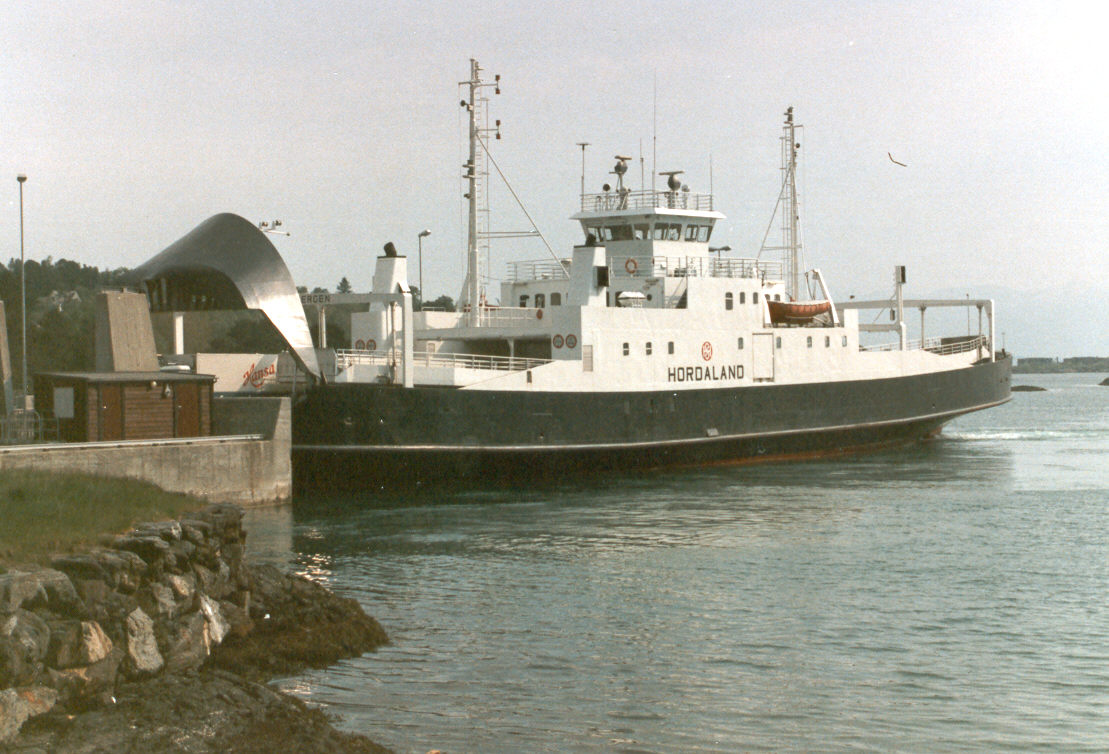
MF Hordaland at Skjersholmane in the early 1990s

Skjersholmane–Valevåg Ferry was an automobile ferry which connected the island of Stord to the mainland in Sveio Municipality. The route was operated by Hardanger Sunnhordlandske Dampskipsselskap (HSD) and ran between Skjersholmane on Stord to Valevåg on the mainland as part of European Route E39. In 2000 the ferry transported 480,103 vehicles and 1,069,446 passengers.

Ferry traffic between Stord and the mainland was started with the ferry Hildur, originally on the route from Leirvik (in Stord Municipality) via Valevåg (in Sveio Municipality) to Mosterhamn (in Bømlo Municipality). The route was started by Nils Hollekim in 1940, but was taken over by HSD and the ferry Tysnes in 1947. Responsibility for the route was taken over by the Norwegian Public Roads Administration in the 1970s, which included the construction of new quays. This route continued to run to the port in Leirvik, but in 1983 it was moved to Skjersholmane where a twin-berth quay was built. As it was part of the main E39 road, it had a 30-minute headway during most of the day. The last two ferries to operate the route were MF Bjørnefjord and MF Hordaland, the largest which could take 140 cars on two decks and 500 passengers. The route was terminated from 27 December 2000, when the Bømlafjord Tunnel, part of the Triangle Link, opened.

In 2007, the ferry was temporarily reinstated as a free ferry service due to maintenance works in the Bømlafjord Tunnel.
