= Osterøy Bridge =

Osterøy Bridge Osterøybrua
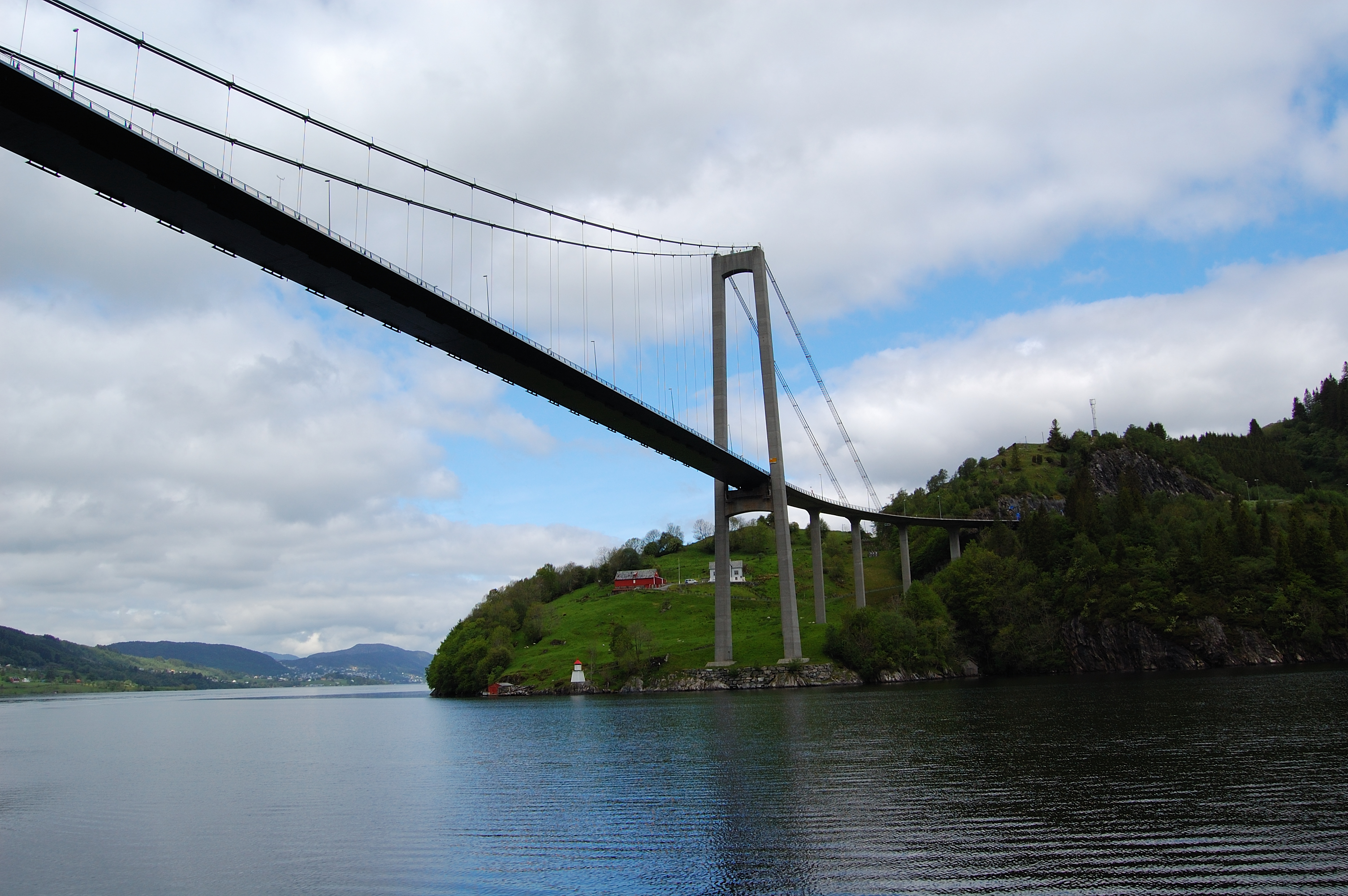
- View of the bridge over Sørfjord
- Coordinates: 60.42576°N 5.53609°E
- Carries: Fv566
- Crosses: Sørfjorden
- Locale: Osterøy Municipality/Bergen Municipality
- Other name: Kvistibrua
- Owner: Statens vegvesen

Characteristics
- Design: Suspension bridge
- Material: Steel and concrete
- Total length: 1,065 metres (3,494 ft)
- Height: 121.7 metres (399 ft)
- Longest span: 595 metres (1,952 ft)
- No. of spans: 8
- Piers in water: None
- Clearance below: 58 metres (190 ft)

History
- Designer: Aas-Jakobsen
- Opened: 1997

Location
- Interactive map of Osterøy Bridge

The Osterøy Bridge (Norwegian: Osterøybrua) is a suspension bridge in Vestland county, Norway. The bridge connects the Kvisti farm area on the island of Osterøy in Osterøy Municipality with the Herland farm area on the mainland in Bergen Municipality east of the city of Bergen. The bridge is the third largest suspension bridge in Norway. It is part of Norwegian County Road 566 (Fylkesvei 566).

The Osterøy Bridge is a 1,065-metre (3,494 ft) long suspension bridge that has a main span of 595 metres (1,952 ft). There are 8 spans, and none of the piers are in the water, just on land. There is 53 metres (174 ft) of clearance below the bridge. The two suspension towers are each 121.5 metres (399 ft) high. The bridge was completed on 3 October 1997 and cost about 308 million kr. The bridge was designed by the structural engineering firm Aas-Jakobsen.

It was put into service 28 years after the first plans for a connection between Osterøy and Bergen were prepared. It was opened for traffic by Sissel Rønbeck, the Norwegian Minister of Transport and Communications. The bridge was built to withstand quite strong winds. Experts have indicated that the bridge should be capable of surviving an extreme storm. The bridge is tuned so that its greatest oscillation occurs when the wind is about 10 metres per second (22 mph) such as a light breeze.

== Media gallery ==
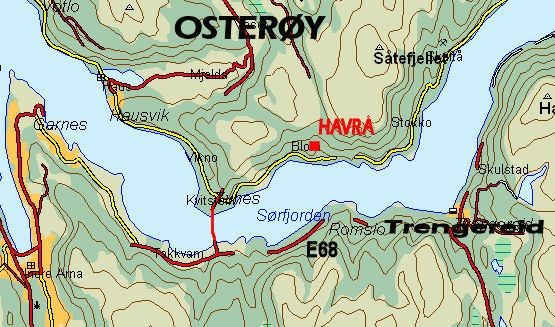
Map of the bridge area

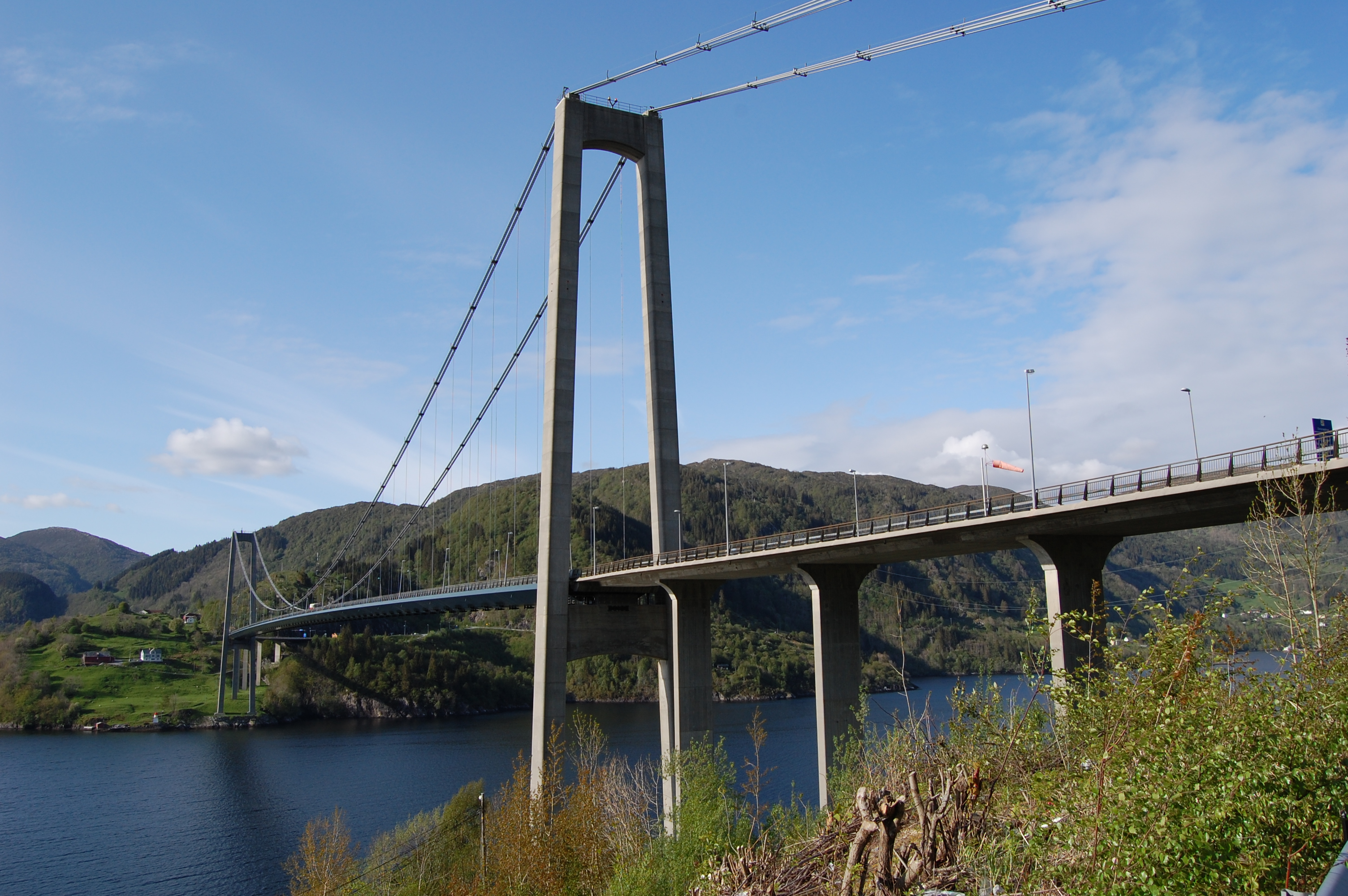

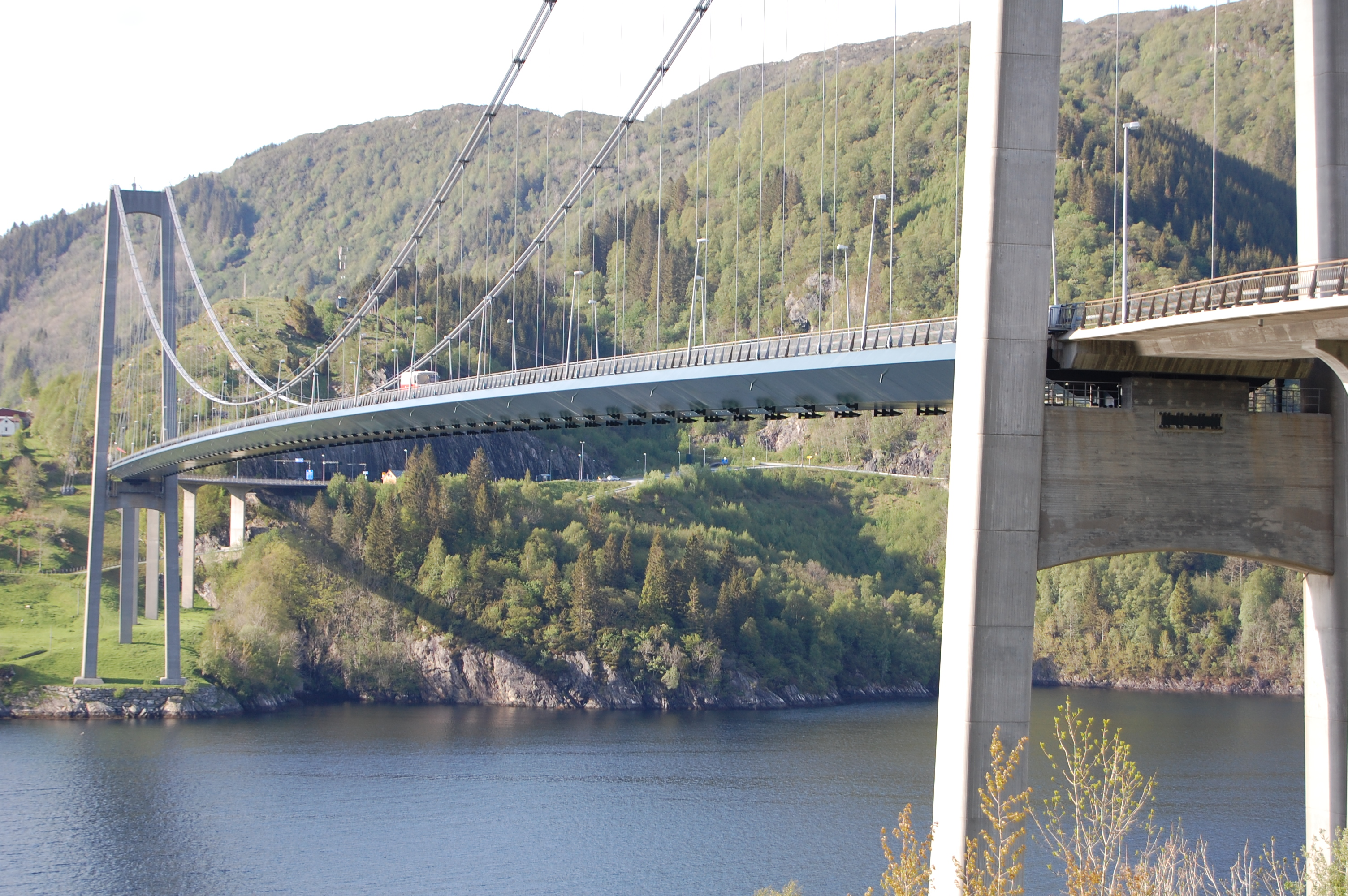
Bridge deck

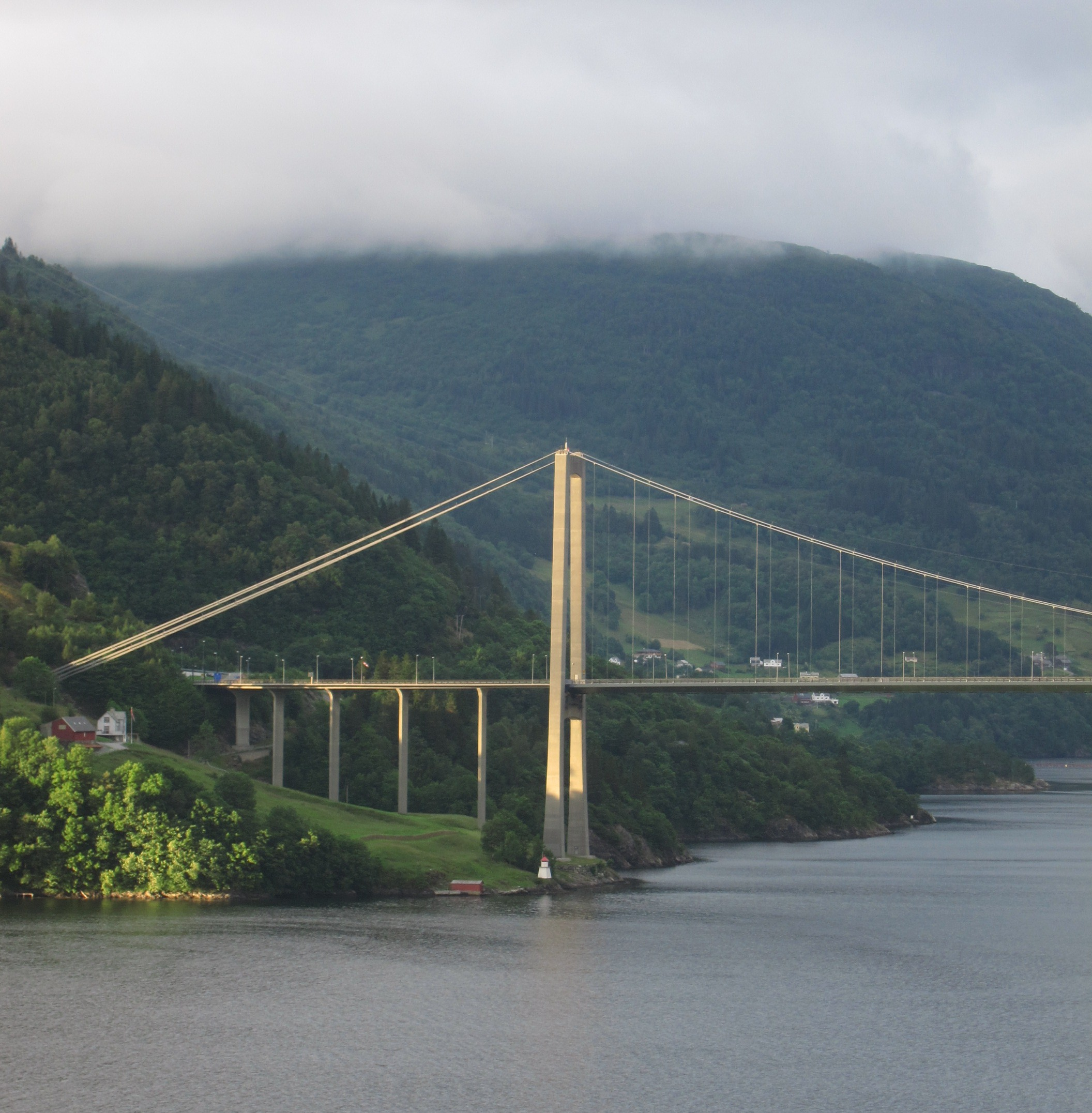
Northern end

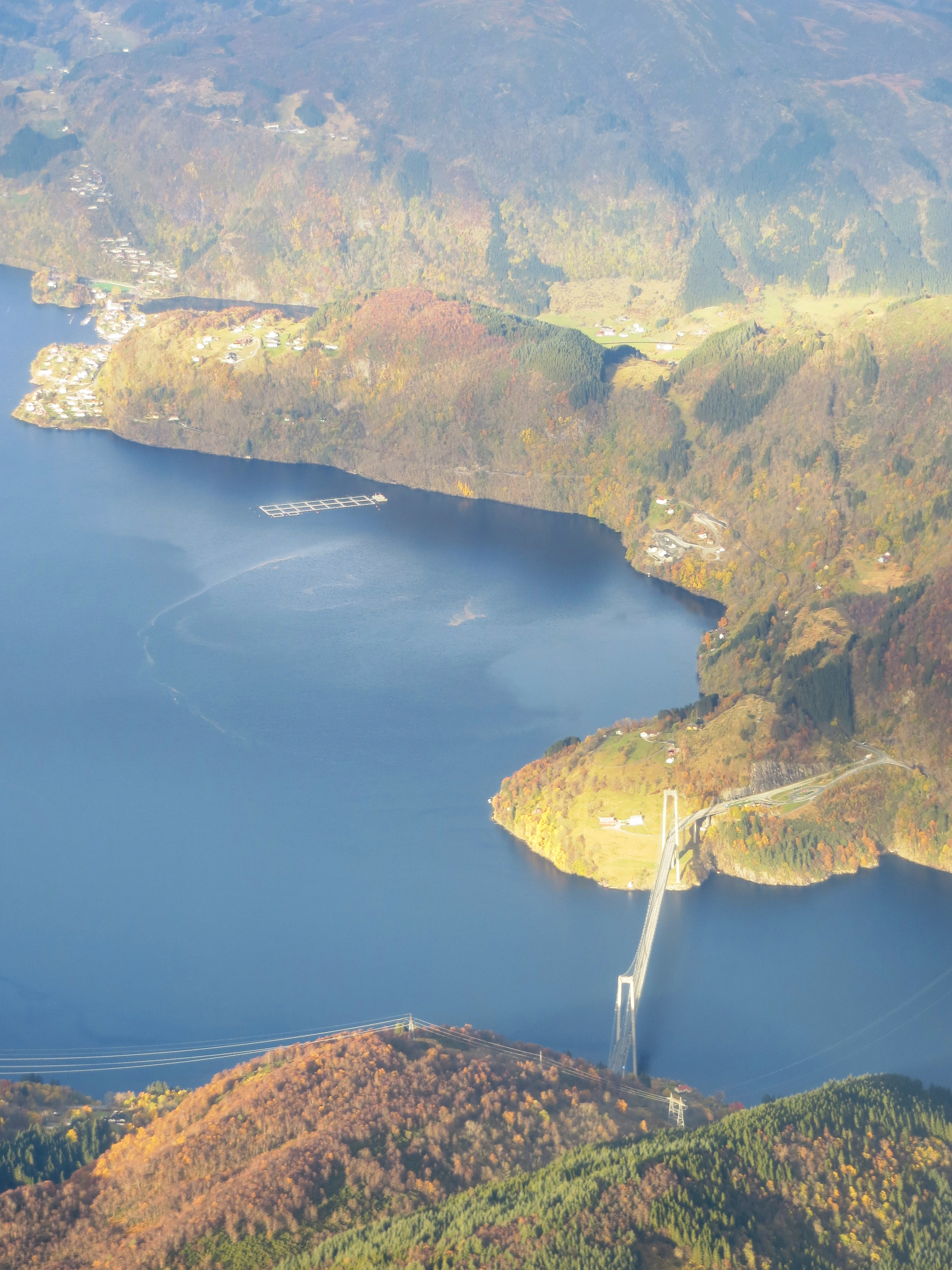
Aerial view of Osterøy
