= Valestrand Municipality =

Former municipality in Hordaland, Norway

Valestrand Municipality Valestrand herad
- Former municipality
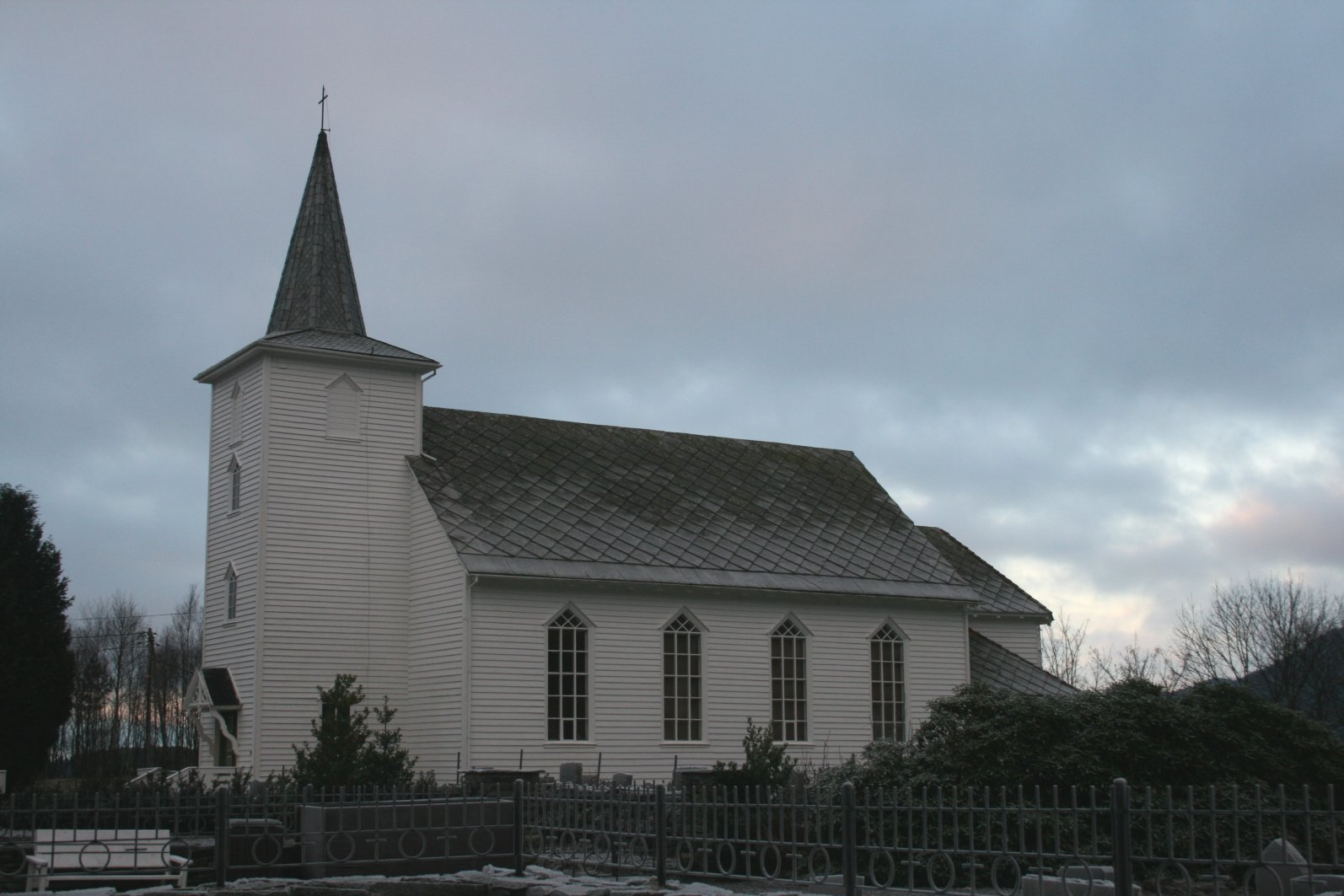
- View of the Valestrand Church

- Hordaland within Norway

- Valestrand within Hordaland
- Coordinates: 59°41′58″N 05°28′20″E
- Country: Norway
- County: Hordaland
- District: Sunnhordland
- Established: 1 January 1868
  - Preceded by: Stord Municipality
- Disestablished: 1 January 1964
  - Succeeded by: Sveio Municipality
- Administrative centre: Valevåg

Government
  - Mayor (1958–1964): Kristoffer Vihovde (V)

Area (upon dissolution)
  - Total: 59.4 km^{2} (22.9 sq mi)
  - Rank: #579 in Norway
- Highest elevation: 431.85 m (1,416.8 ft)

Population (1962)
  - Total: 1,227
  - Rank: #580 in Norway
  - Density: 20.7/km^{2} (54/sq mi)
  - Change (10 years): ▲ +1.9%
- Demonym: Valestrending

Official language
  - Norwegian form: Nynorsk
- Time zone: UTC+01:00 (CET)
  - Summer (DST): UTC+02:00 (CEST)
- ISO 3166 code: NO-1217

Valestrand is a former municipality in the old Hordaland county, Norway. The 59.4-square-kilometre (22.9 sq mi) municipality existed from 1868 until its dissolution in 1964. The area is now part of Sveio Municipality in the traditional district of Sunnhordland in Vestland county. The administrative centre was the village of Valevåg. Other villages in the municipality included Valestrand and Auklandshamn.

Prior to its dissolution in 1964, the 59.4-square-kilometre (22.9 sq mi) municipality was the 579th largest by area out of the 689 municipalities in Norway. Valestrand Municipality was the 580th most populous municipality in Norway with a population of about 1,227. The municipality's population density was 20.7 inhabitants per square kilometre (54/sq mi) and its population had increased by 1.9% over the previous 10-year period.

== General information ==
The municipality of Valestrand was established on 15 May 1868 when the large Stordøen Municipality was divided as follows:

- the areas located south of the Bømlafjorden (population: 900) became the new Valestrand Municipality
- the areas located north of the Bømlafjorden (population: 1,734) remained as a smaller Stordøen Municipality

On 1 April 1870, the Øklandsgrend area (population: 247) of the neighboring Finnaas Municipality was transferred to Valestrand Municipality.

On 1 January 1964, a major municipal merger took place as a result of the Schei Committee. On that date, the following areas were merged to form a new, larger Sveio Municipality:

- all of Sveio Municipality (population: 1,697)
- all of Valestrand Municipality (population: 1,216)
- the western part of Vikebygd Municipality (population: 471)
- the Flatnæs-Buvik area of Skjold Municipality located northwest of the Ålfjorden (population: 24); this area was part of Rogaland county, so it switched to Hordaland county on that date

=== Name ===
The municipality (originally the parish) is named after the old Valen farm (Old Norse: Vaðlar) since the first Valestrand Church was built there. The first element is the plural genitive case of vaðill which means "ford" or "shallow water". The last element, strand, was added as a suffix to the farm name. It was derived from the word strǫnd which means "shore" or "beach".

=== Churches ===
The Church of Norway had one parish (sokn) within Valestrand Municipality. At the time of the municipal dissolution, it was part of the Sveio prestegjeld and the Søndre Sunnhordland prosti (deanery) in the Diocese of Bjørgvin.

Churches in Valestrand Municipality
Parish (sokn)	Church name	Location of the church	Year built
Valestrand	Valestrand Church	Valestrand	1873
Valestrand	Valen Chapel	Valevåg	1707

== Geography ==
It was located on a peninsula on the southern shore of the Bømlafjorden. The highest point in the municipality was the 431.85-metre (1,416.8 ft) tall mountain Trollevassnibba. Stord Municipality was located to the north, Fjelberg Municipality was located to the northeast, Ølen Municipality was located to the east, Vikebygd Municipality was located to the south, Sveio Municipality was located to the southwest, and Moster Municipality was located to the west.

== Government ==
While it existed, _____ Municipality was responsible for primary education (through 10th grade), outpatient health services, senior citizen services, welfare and other social services, zoning, economic development, and municipal roads and utilities. The municipality was governed by a municipal council of directly elected representatives. The mayor was indirectly elected by a vote of the municipal council. The municipality was under the jurisdiction of the Sunnhordland District Court and the Gulating Court of Appeal.

=== Municipal council ===
The municipal council (Heradsstyre) of Valestrand Municipality was made up of 13 representatives that were elected to four year terms. The tables below show the historical composition of the council by political party.

Valestrand heradsstyre 1959–1963
Party name (in Nynorsk)	Number of representatives
Labour Party (Arbeidarpartiet)	2
Local List(s) (Lokale lister)	11
Total number of members:	13
Note: On 1 January 1964, Valestrand Municipality became part of Sveio Municipality.

Valestrand heradsstyre 1955–1959
Party name (in Nynorsk)	Number of representatives
Labour Party (Arbeidarpartiet)	3
Local List(s) (Lokale lister)	10
Total number of members:	13

Valestrand heradsstyre 1951–1955
Party name (in Nynorsk)	Number of representatives
Labour Party (Arbeidarpartiet)	2
Local List(s) (Lokale lister)	10
Total number of members:	12

Valestrand heradsstyre 1947–1951
Party name (in Nynorsk)	Number of representatives
Labour Party (Arbeidarpartiet)	4
Local List(s) (Lokale lister)	8
Total number of members:	12

Valestrand heradsstyre 1945–1947
Party name (in Nynorsk)	Number of representatives
List of workers, fishermen, and small farmholders (Arbeidarar, fiskarar, småbrukarar liste)	3
Local List(s) (Lokale lister)	9
Total number of members:	12

Valestrand heradsstyre 1937–1941*
Party name (in Nynorsk)	Number of representatives
Local List(s) (Lokale lister)	12
Total number of members:	12
Note: Due to the German occupation of Norway during World War II, no elections were held for new municipal councils until after the war ended in 1945.

=== Mayors ===
The mayor (Nynorsk: ordførar) of Valestrand Municipality was the political leader of the municipality and the chairperson of the municipal council. The following people have held this position:

- 1868–1871: Nils Sundnæs
- 1872–1875: Mathias Økland
- 1876–1878: Torbjørn D. Hope
- 1879–1887: Mathias Økland
- 1888–1913: Gregorius G. Egeland
- 1914–1919: Christian Sundnes
- 1920–1937: Erik Kvammen
- 1937–1945: Elling Horneland
- 1946–1951: Hans Bua (Ap)
- 1952–1955: Olav Vihovde
- 1955–1958: Hans Bua (Ap)
- 1958–1964: Kristoffer Vihovde (V)

== Notable people ==
- Einar Økland, a poet, playwright, essayist and children's writer
- Fartein Valen, a composer and music theorist
- Agnes Ravatn, an author, columnist, and journalist
- Ole Bull, a violinist and composer

== See also ==
- List of former municipalities of Norway
