= Økland =

Økland is a surname. Notable people with the surname include:

- Arne Larsen Økland (born 1954), former Norwegian football player and coach
- Einar Økland (born 1940), Norwegian lyricist, playwright, essayist and children's writer
- Kari Økland (born 1955), Norwegian politician for the Christian Democratic Party
- Nils Økland (Esperantist) (1882–1969), Norwegian Esperantist and teacher in Stord (Hordaland), Norway
- Nils Økland (musician) (born 1961), Norwegian Hardangar fiddle player
- Torbjørn Økland (born 1964), Norwegian musician

See also

- Aukland (disambiguation)
