= Sveio =

Sveio may refer to:

== Places ==
- Sveio Municipality, a municipality in Vestland county, Norway
- Sveio (village), a village within Sveio Municipality in Vestland county, Norway
- Sveio Church, a church in Sveio Municipality in Vestland county, Norway

== Other uses ==
- MF Sveio, a former car ferry in Vestland county, Norway operated by Norled
