= Aukland =

Aukland may refer to:

== People ==
- Aukland (surname), a list of people with the surname Aukland

== Places ==
- Aukland, Torridal, village in the Torridal valley in Kristiansand municipality in Vest-Agder county, Norway
- Aukland, Lindesnes, village in Lindesnes municipality in Vest-Agder county, Norway
- Aukland or Auklandshamn, a village in Sveio municipality in Vestland county, Norway

== See also ==
- Auckland, the largest city of New Zealand
- Augland (disambiguation)
