= Ryvarden Lighthouse =

Coastal lighthouse in Sveio, Norway

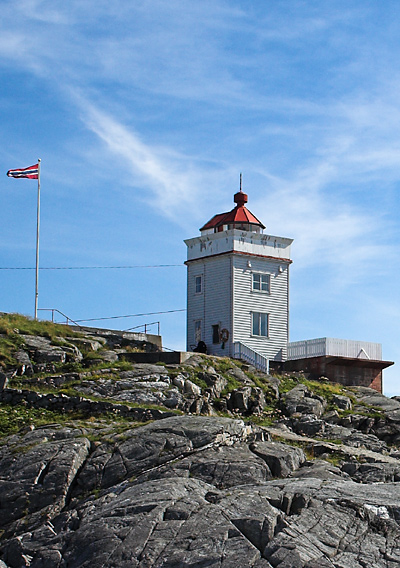
- Ryvarden Lighthouse
- Location: Sveio Municipality, Vestland, Norway
- Coordinates: 59°31′37″N 5°13′31″E

Tower
- Constructed: 1849
- Construction: wood
- Automated: 1984
- Height: 10 m (33 ft)
- Shape: square tower
- Markings: white tower, red lantern roof
- Operator: Sveio Municipality

Light
- Focal height: 22 m (72 ft)
- Intensity: 7,000 candela
- Range: 12.7 nmi (23.5 km; 14.6 mi)
- Characteristic: Oc(3) WRG 10s

Ryvarden Lighthouse (Norwegian: Ryvarden fyr) is a coastal lighthouse on the western coast of Sveio Municipality in Vestland county, Norway. The lighthouse was established in 1849 to mark the southern shore of the entrance to the Bømlafjorden from the sea. It is located about 8 kilometres (5.0 mi) southwest of the municipal centre of Sveio. In 1984, the lighthouse was automated and it no longer needed a live-in lighthouse keeper on the site. In 2005, the municipality bought the building and the buildings are now used as a regional cultural centre/museum.

The 10-metre (33 ft) tall square wooden tower is white with a red lantern at the top. The light is emitted at an elevation of 22.3 metres (73 ft) above the sea level. The light on top emits a white, red or green light, depending on direction, occulting three times every 10 seconds. The lighthouse is in use from dusk until dawn every day from 1 July until 10 June each year (it is not in use for part of June due to the midnight sun in this part of the world).

== See also ==
- List of lighthouses in Norway
- Lighthouses in Norway
