= Augland (disambiguation) =

Augland is a neighbourhood in the borough of Vågsbygd in the city of Kristiansand in Vest-Agder county, Norway.

Augland may also refer to:

- Augland or Aukland, Torridal, village in the Torridal valley in the city of Kristiansand in Vest-Agder county, Norway
- Augland or Aukland, Lindesnes, village in Lindesnes municipality in Vest-Agder county, Norway

== See also ==
- Aukland (disambiguation)
- Auckland, New Zealand city
