= Nils Økland =

Nils Økland may refer to:

- Nils Økland (Esperantist)
- Nils Økland (musician)
