= Våga, Vestland =

Village in Sveio Municipality, Norway

Våga Søre Våge
- Village
- Interactive map of Våga
- Coordinates: 59.48188°N 5.30681°E
- Country: Norway
- Region: Western Norway
- County: Vestland
- District: Sunnhordland
- Municipality: Sveio Municipality
- Elevation: 29 m (95 ft)
- Time zone: UTC+01:00 (CET)
  - Summer (DST): UTC+02:00 (CEST)
- Post Code: 5550 Sveio

Våga is a small village in Sveio Municipality in Vestland county, Norway. The village is located on the east side of Viksefjorden, along the county border with Rogaland county. Norwegian County Road 47 runs through the village, connecting it to the town of Haugesund about 10 kilometres (6.2 mi) to the south and to the village of Sveio, located about 8 kilometres (5.0 mi) to the north.
