= Stakkastadvatnet =

Lake in Vestland, Norway

- Interactive map of Stakkastadvatnet
- Location: Rogaland and Vestland
- Coordinates: 59.45859°N 5.38662°E
- Basin countries: Norway
- Max. length: 5.3 kilometres (3.3 mi)
- Max. width: 1.4 kilometres (0.87 mi)
- Surface area: 2.92 km^{2} (1.13 sq mi)
- Shore length^{1}: 23.97 kilometres (14.89 mi)
- Surface elevation: 12 metres (39 ft)
- References: NVE
- ^{1} Shore length is not a well-defined measure.

Stakkastadvatnet is a lake on the border of Rogaland and Vestland counties in Norway. The 2.92-square-kilometre (1.13 sq mi) lake mostly lies in Rogaland along the borders of Haugesund Municipality and Tysvær Municipality. A very small portion of the northern part of the lake crosses over into Sveio Municipality in Vestland county. The lake lies about 6 kilometres (3.7 mi) northeast of the town of Haugesund. The lake has a small dam on the northwestern edge of the lake. The natural outlet of the lake flows through the dam and into the nearby lake Vigdarvatnet, located to the north.

== See also ==
- List of lakes in Norway
