= Sveio Municipality =

Municipality in Vestland, Norway

Sveio Municipality Sveio kommune
- Municipality
- Sveen herred (historic name)
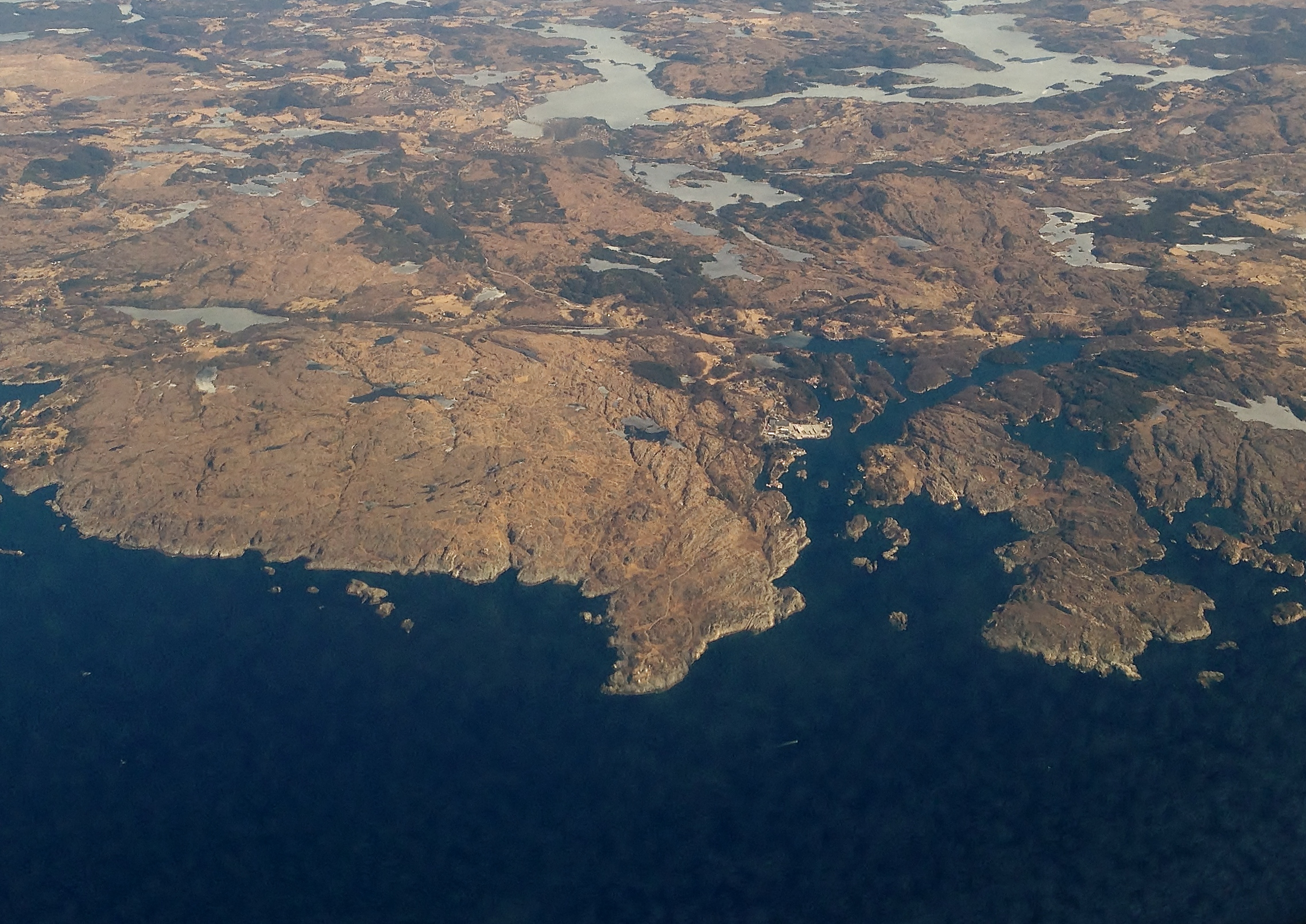
- View of the Ryvarden coastline in Sveio

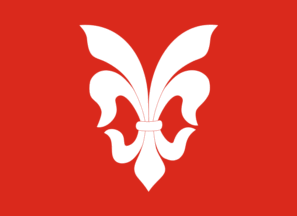
- Flag Coat of arms

- Vestland within Norway

- Sveio within Vestland
- Coordinates: 59°34′25″N 05°21′48″E
- Country: Norway
- County: Vestland
- District: Haugalandet
- Established: 1865
  - Preceded by: Fjelberg Municipality and Finnaas Municipality
- Administrative centre: Sveio

Government
  - Mayor (2023): André Mundal Haukås (H)

Area
  - Total: 246.15 km^{2} (95.04 sq mi)
  - Land: 224.49 km^{2} (86.68 sq mi)
  - Water: 21.66 km^{2} (8.36 sq mi) 8.8%
  - Rank: #291 in Norway
- Highest elevation: 431.85 m (1,416.8 ft)

Population (2025)
  - Total: 5,752
  - Rank: #167 in Norway
  - Density: 23.4/km^{2} (61/sq mi)
  - Change (10 years): ▲ +5.1%
- Demonym: Sveibu

Official language
  - Norwegian form: Nynorsk
- Time zone: UTC+01:00 (CET)
  - Summer (DST): UTC+02:00 (CEST)
- ISO 3166 code: NO-4612
- Website: Official website

Sveio is a municipality in Vestland county, Norway. The administrative centre of the municipality is the village of Sveio. Other villages in the municipality include Auklandshamn, Førde, Våga, and Valevåg. Sveio Municipality is a border district that is sometimes considered to be located in the traditional district of Haugalandet since it is located on the Haugalandet peninsula, but it is also considered to be in the traditional district of Sunnhordland since it is located in southern Vestland county.

The 246.15-square-kilometre (95.04 sq mi) municipality is the 291st largest by area out of the 357 municipalities in Norway. Sveio Municipality is the 167th most populous municipality in Norway with a population of 5,752. The municipality's population density is 23.4 inhabitants per square kilometre (61/sq mi) and its population has increased by 5.1% over the previous 10-year period.

Sveio Municipality is the site of the Ryvarden Lighthouse which marks the western entrance to the Hardangerfjorden. The lighthouse is automated and the old keepers' house and building have now been converted into art galleries, the Flókemuseum, and a cafe. The composer Fartein Valen lived much of his life in Valevåg in northern Sveio. Valenheimen, the house he lived in is open to the public and the Fartein Valen Festival is held annually in Sveio.

The Triangle Link bridge-tunnel network is based in northern Sveio, connecting the islands to the north to the mainland. The southern entrance to the Bømlafjord Tunnel is located along the European route E39 highway, just south of the village of Valevåg.

== General information ==
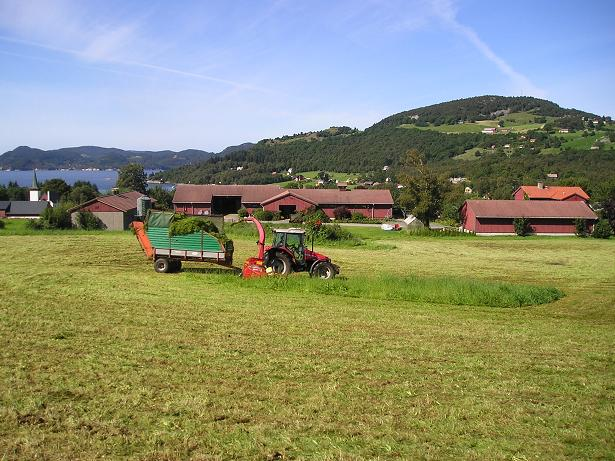
View of the Vikebygd area

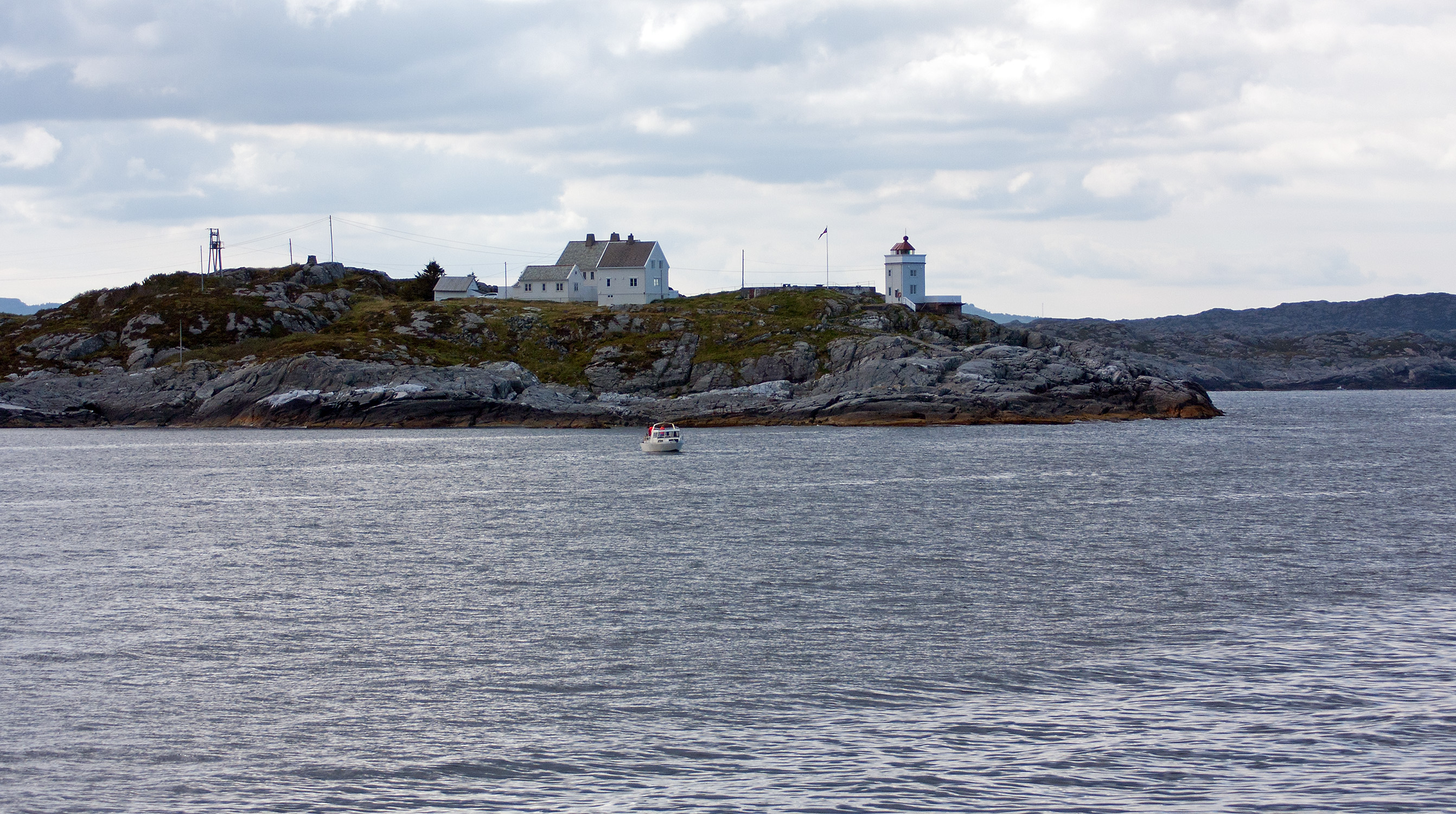
View of the Ryvarden Lighthouse

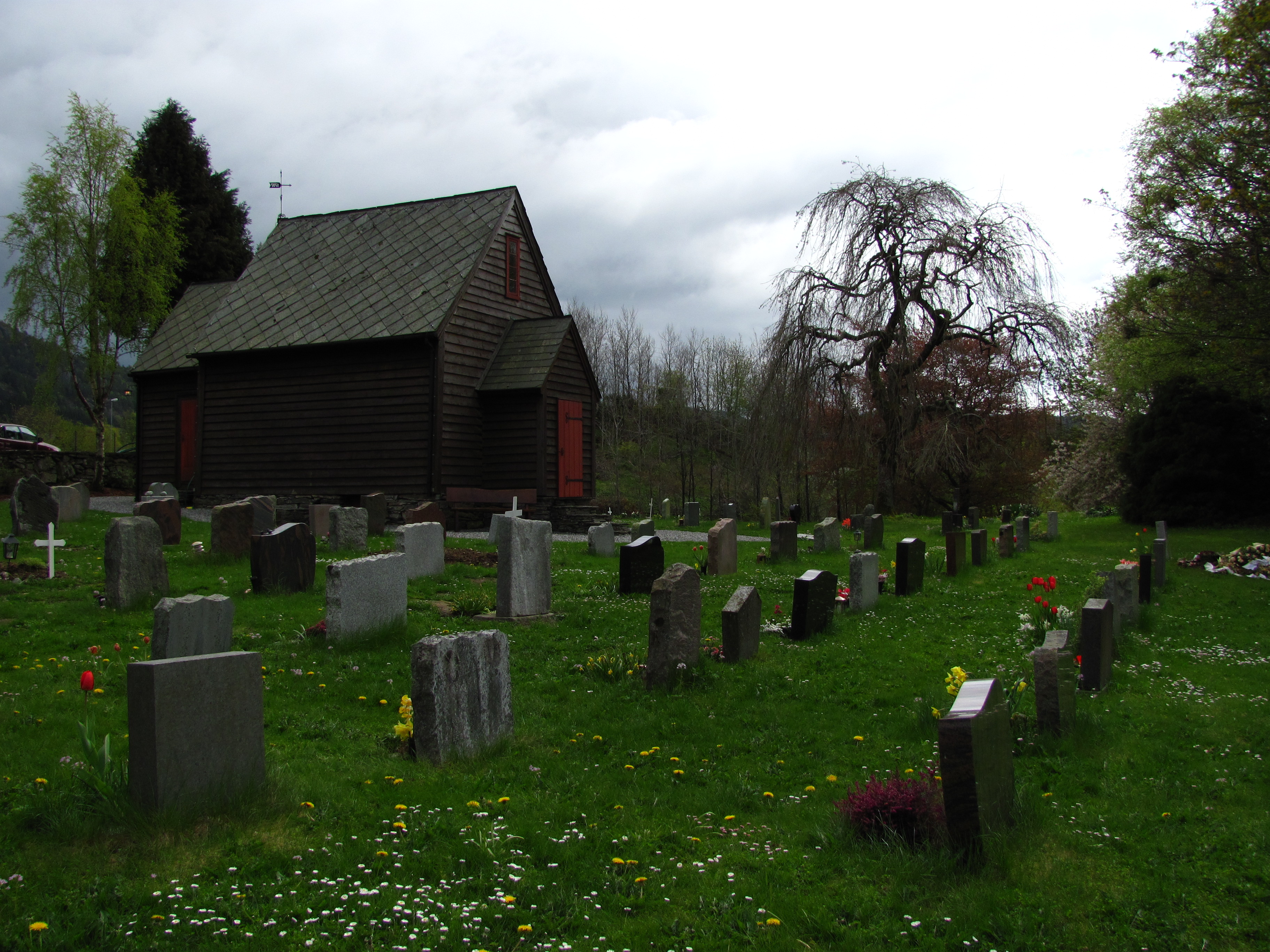
View of Valen Chapel

The municipality of Sveio was established in 1865 by merging the following areas to create the new Sveen Municipality (the name was later changed to Sveio Municipality).

- the areas of Finnaas Municipality located south of the Bømlafjorden (population: 2,227)
- the Vikebygd part of Fjelberg Municipality (population: 1,062)

On 1 January 1902, the eastern area of Sveen Municipality (population: 1,092) was separated to form the new Vikebygd Municipality.

During the 1960s, there were many municipal mergers across Norway due to the work of the Schei Committee. On 1 January 1964, the following areas were merged to form a new, larger Sveio Municipality:

- all of Sveio Municipality (population: 1,697)
- all of Valestrand Municipality (population: 1,216)
- the parts of Vikebygd Municipality located west of the Ålfjorden (population: 471)
- the small Flatnes-Buvik area of Skjold Municipality (population: 24); this area was transferred from Rogaland county to Hordaland county on the same date

=== Name ===
The municipality (originally the parish) is named after the old Sveio farm (Old Norse: Svíða) since the medieval Sveio Church was built there. The name is identical with the word svíða which means "to singe" or "to burn", referring to an area that was cleared by burning. Historically, the name of the municipality was spelled Sveen. On 1 December 1911, a royal resolution changed the spelling of the name of the municipality to Sveio.

=== Coat of arms ===
The coat of arms was granted on 19 February 1982. The official blazon is "Gules, a fleur-de-lis cleft argent." (Norwegian: På raud grunn ei kløyvd kvit lilje). This means the arms have a red field (background) and the charge is a split fleur-de-lis. The charge has a tincture of argent which means it is commonly colored white, but if it is made out of metal, then silver is used. The arms are derived from the historic arms of Jon Gauteson from Sveio, who lived around the year 1500. His family became Norwegian nobility in 1591, and he was the first in his family to use this symbol as part of his arms. The municipal arms were designed by Kolbjørn Ekkje. The municipal flag has the same design as the coat of arms.

=== Churches ===
The Church of Norway has two parishes (sokn) within Sveio Municipality. It is part of the Sunnhordland prosti (deanery) in the Diocese of Bjørgvin.

Churches in Sveio Municipality
Parish (sokn)	Church name	Location of the church	Year built
Sveio	Sveio Church	Sveio	1858
Valestrand og Førde	Førde Church	Førde	1938
Valestrand og Førde	Valestrand Church	Valestrand	1873
Valestrand og Førde	Valen Chapel	Valevåg	1707

== Geography ==
The municipality is located on the mainland of Norway on the western coast of the county on the Haugalandet peninsula, facing the North Sea to the west. The entrance to the Hardangerfjorden lies along the northern side of the municipality, and the smaller Ålfjorden lies along the eastern border of the municipality. Sveio Municipality's southern border is also the Rogaland county border, bordering Haugesund Municipality and Tysvær Municipality to the south, Vindafjord Municipality to the east (across the Ålfjorden), and the islands of Bømlo Municipality and Stord Municipality to the north (across the Hardangerfjorden). The lakes Vigdarvatnet and Stakkastadvatnet lie in the southern part of the municipality, crossing into the neighboring municipalities. The Ryvarden Lighthouse is located on a small point, along the Hardangerfjorden. The highest point in the municipality is the 431.85-metre (1,416.8 ft) tall mountain Trollevassnibba.

== Population ==
Historical population
Year	1865	1875	1900	1910	1920	1930	1946	1951	1960	1970	1980	1990	2000	2010	2020	2023
Pop.	3,289	3,340	3,138	1,957	1,937	1,938	1,979	1,954	1,782	3,477	4,216	4,582	4,623	4,999	5,766	5,732
±% p.a.	—	+0.15%	−0.25%	−4.61%	−0.10%	+0.01%	+0.13%	−0.25%	−1.02%	+6.91%	+1.95%	+0.84%	+0.09%	+0.79%	+1.44%	−0.20%
Note: The municipal borders were changed in 1902 and 1964, causing a significant change in the population. Source: Statistics Norway and Norwegian Historical Data Centre

== Government ==
Sveio Municipality is responsible for primary education (through 10th grade), outpatient health services, senior citizen services, welfare and other social services, zoning, economic development, and municipal roads and utilities. The municipality is governed by a municipal council of directly elected representatives. The mayor is indirectly elected by a vote of the municipal council. The municipality is under the jurisdiction of the Haugaland og Sunnhordland District Court and the Gulating Court of Appeal.

=== Municipal council ===
The municipal council (Kommunestyre) of Sveio Municipality is made up of 25 representatives that are elected to four year terms. The tables below show the current and historical composition of the council by political party.

Sveio kommunestyre 2023–2027
Party name (in Nynorsk)	Number of representatives
Labour Party (Arbeidarpartiet)	5
Progress Party (Framstegspartiet)	4
Green Party (Miljøpartiet Dei Grøne)	1
Conservative Party (Høgre)	5
Industry and Business Party (Industri‑ og Næringspartiet)	2
Christian Democratic Party (Kristeleg Folkeparti)	2
Centre Party (Senterpartiet)	3
Socialist Left Party (Sosialistisk Venstreparti)	1
Cross-party common list (Tverrpolitisk fellesliste)	2
Total number of members:	25

Sveio kommunestyre 2019–2023
Party name (in Nynorsk)	Number of representatives
Labour Party (Arbeidarpartiet)	7
Progress Party (Framstegspartiet)	4
Green Party (Miljøpartiet Dei Grøne)	1
Conservative Party (Høgre)	5
Christian Democratic Party (Kristeleg Folkeparti)	2
Centre Party (Senterpartiet)	5
Socialist Left Party (Sosialistisk Venstreparti)	1
Total number of members:	25

Sveio kommunestyre 2015–2019
Party name (in Nynorsk)	Number of representatives
Labour Party (Arbeidarpartiet)	9
Progress Party (Framstegspartiet)	4
Green Party (Miljøpartiet Dei Grøne)	1
Conservative Party (Høgre)	4
Christian Democratic Party (Kristeleg Folkeparti)	3
Centre Party (Senterpartiet)	3
Liberal Party (Venstre)	1
Total number of members:	25

Sveio kommunestyre 2011–2015
Party name (in Nynorsk)	Number of representatives
Labour Party (Arbeidarpartiet)	5
Progress Party (Framstegspartiet)	5
Conservative Party (Høgre)	6
Christian Democratic Party (Kristeleg Folkeparti)	4
Centre Party (Senterpartiet)	3
Liberal Party (Venstre)	1
Joint list of the Socialist Left Party (Sosialistisk Venstreparti) and the Green Party (Miljøpartiet Dei Grøne)	1
Total number of members:	25

Sveio kommunestyre 2007–2011
Party name (in Nynorsk)	Number of representatives
Labour Party (Arbeidarpartiet)	8
Progress Party (Framstegspartiet)	5
Conservative Party (Høgre)	2
Christian Democratic Party (Kristeleg Folkeparti)	4
Coastal Party (Kystpartiet)	1
Centre Party (Senterpartiet)	3
Liberal Party (Venstre)	1
Local list for Sveio (Bygdeliste for Sveio)	1
Total number of members:	25

Sveio kommunestyre 2003–2007
Party name (in Nynorsk)	Number of representatives
Labour Party (Arbeidarpartiet)	5
Progress Party (Framstegspartiet)	6
Conservative Party (Høgre)	1
Christian Democratic Party (Kristeleg Folkeparti)	3
Coastal Party (Kystpartiet)	1
Centre Party (Senterpartiet)	3
Socialist Left Party (Sosialistisk Venstreparti)	2
Liberal Party (Venstre)	2
Local list for Sveio (Bygdeliste for Sveio)	2
Total number of members:	25

Sveio kommunestyre 1999–2003
Party name (in Nynorsk)	Number of representatives
Labour Party (Arbeidarpartiet)	3
Progress Party (Framstegspartiet)	3
Conservative Party (Høgre)	3
Christian Democratic Party (Kristeleg Folkeparti)	6
Centre Party (Senterpartiet)	3
Socialist Left Party (Sosialistisk Venstreparti)	2
Liberal Party (Venstre)	2
Local list for Sveio (Bygdeliste for Sveio)	3
Total number of members:	25

Sveio kommunestyre 1995–1999
Party name (in Nynorsk)	Number of representatives
Labour Party (Arbeidarpartiet)	5
Progress Party (Framstegspartiet)	1
Conservative Party (Høgre)	3
Christian Democratic Party (Kristeleg Folkeparti)	4
Centre Party (Senterpartiet)	4
Socialist Left Party (Sosialistisk Venstreparti)	1
Liberal Party (Venstre)	3
Local list for Sveio (Bygdelista for Sveio)	4
Total number of members:	25

Sveio kommunestyre 1991–1995
Party name (in Nynorsk)	Number of representatives
Labour Party (Arbeidarpartiet)	4
Progress Party (Framstegspartiet)	1
Conservative Party (Høgre)	4
Christian Democratic Party (Kristeleg Folkeparti)	5
Centre Party (Senterpartiet)	5
Socialist Left Party (Sosialistisk Venstreparti)	2
Liberal Party (Venstre)	1
Local list - South (Bygdelista - Sør)	3
Total number of members:	25

Sveio kommunestyre 1987–1991
Party name (in Nynorsk)	Number of representatives
Labour Party (Arbeidarpartiet)	6
Progress Party (Framstegspartiet)	2
Conservative Party (Høgre)	4
Christian Democratic Party (Kristeleg Folkeparti)	5
Centre Party (Senterpartiet)	2
Liberal Party (Venstre)	2
Local list - South (Bygdelista - Sør)	3
Local list Eikeland (Bygdelista Eikeland)	3
Total number of members:	25

Sveio kommunestyre 1983–1987
Party name (in Nynorsk)	Number of representatives
Labour Party (Arbeidarpartiet)	6
Progress Party (Framstegspartiet)	1
Conservative Party (Høgre)	5
Christian Democratic Party (Kristeleg Folkeparti)	4
Centre Party (Senterpartiet)	4
Liberal Party (Venstre)	1
Local list for the Rua, Lid, Sveio, Vandaskog, and Vikse areas (Bygdelista for krinsane Rua, Lid, Sveio, Vandaskog og Vikse)	2
Local list Eikeland (Bygdelista Eikeland)	2
Total number of members:	25

Sveio kommunestyre 1979–1983
Party name (in Nynorsk)	Number of representatives
Labour Party (Arbeidarpartiet)	4
Progress Party (Framstegspartiet)	1
Conservative Party (Høgre)	6
Christian Democratic Party (Kristeleg Folkeparti)	6
Centre Party (Senterpartiet)	4
Liberal Party (Venstre)	1
Local list (Bygdelista)	3
Total number of members:	25

Sveio kommunestyre 1975–1979
Party name (in Nynorsk)	Number of representatives
Labour Party (Arbeidarpartiet)	3
Joint list of the Centre Party (Senterpartiet) and the Christian Democratic Party (Kristeleg Folkeparti)	12
Local list for Bua, Eikeland, Lid, Oa, Rød, Sveio, Vandaskog, and Vikse (Bygdelista for Bua, Eikeland, Lid, Oa, Rød, Sveio, Vandaskog og Vikse)	6
Local list for Einstabøvoll, Ørevik, and Førde (Bygdelista for Einstabøvoll, Ørevik og Førde)	4
Total number of members:	25

Sveio kommunestyre 1971–1975
Party name (in Nynorsk)	Number of representatives
Labour Party (Arbeidarpartiet)	4
Local List(s) (Lokale lister)	21
Total number of members:	25

Sveio kommunestyre 1967–1971
Party name (in Nynorsk)	Number of representatives
Labour Party (Arbeidarpartiet)	4
Local List(s) (Lokale lister)	21
Total number of members:	25

Sveio kommunestyre 1963–1967
Party name (in Nynorsk)	Number of representatives
Labour Party (Arbeidarpartiet)	5
Local List(s) (Lokale lister)	20
Total number of members:	25

Sveio heradsstyre 1959–1963
Party name (in Nynorsk)	Number of representatives
Labour Party (Arbeidarpartiet)	2
Local List(s) (Lokale lister)	15
Total number of members:	17

Sveio heradsstyre 1955–1959
Party name (in Nynorsk)	Number of representatives
Christian Democratic Party (Kristeleg Folkeparti)	3
Local List(s) (Lokale lister)	14
Total number of members:	17

Sveio heradsstyre 1951–1955
Party name (in Nynorsk)	Number of representatives
Christian Democratic Party (Kristeleg Folkeparti)	4
List of workers, fishermen, and small farmholders (Arbeidarar, fiskarar, småbrukarar liste)	1
Local List(s) (Lokale lister)	11
Total number of members:	16

Sveio heradsstyre 1947–1951
Party name (in Nynorsk)	Number of representatives
Labour Party (Arbeidarpartiet)	2
Local List(s) (Lokale lister)	14
Total number of members:	16

Sveio heradsstyre 1945–1947
Party name (in Nynorsk)	Number of representatives
Labour Party (Arbeidarpartiet)	2
Local List(s) (Lokale lister)	14
Total number of members:	16

Sveio heradsstyre 1937–1941*
Party name (in Nynorsk)	Number of representatives
Labour Party (Arbeidarpartiet)	2
Local List(s) (Lokale lister)	14
Total number of members:	16
Note: Due to the German occupation of Norway during World War II, no elections were held for new municipal councils until after the war ended in 1945.

=== Mayors ===
The mayor (Nynorsk: ordførar) of Sveio Municipality is the political leader of the municipality and the chairperson of the municipal council. The following people have held this position:

- 1865–1867: Jens Johannessen Tvedt
- 1868–1869: Gunnar Johannessen Røkenes
- 1870–1873: G.F. Gautessen
- 1874–1877: Reinert Enerstvedt
- 1878–1883: Gunnar Johannessen Røkenes
- 1884–1893: Jakob Stensen Haukås (H)
- 1894–1901: Ivar Rodvold (H)
- 1902–1910: Absalon Eritsland (H)
- 1911–1913: Bendik Bjelland
- 1914–1916: Mikal Mølstrevold
- 1917–1922: Peder Hansen (V)
- 1923–1927: Georg Tveit (V)
- 1928–1945: Jakob Enerstvedt (H)
- 1946–1951: Sigurd Hjellum (V)
- 1952–1955: Harald Unneland (V)
- 1956–1963: Sigurd Hjellum (V)
- 1964–1967: Harald Unneland (V)
- 1968–1969: S. Ludvig Rasmussen (V)
- 1970–1973: Ingebrigt Rossehaug (KrF)
- 1974–1978: Harald Straume (Sp)
- 1978–1979: Olav Vihovde (KrF)
- 1988–1990: Mikal Møller Hovda (H)
- 1991–1991: Reinert Rød (KrF)
- 1992–1999: Magnus Skåden (Ap)
- 1999–2003: Olav Haugen (KrF)
- 2003–2011: Jorunn Skåden (Ap)
- 2011–2015: Ruth Grethe Eriksen (FrP)
- 2015–2019: Jorunn Skåden (Ap)
- 2019–2023: Linn Therese Erve (Ap)
- 2023–present: André Mundal Haukås (H)

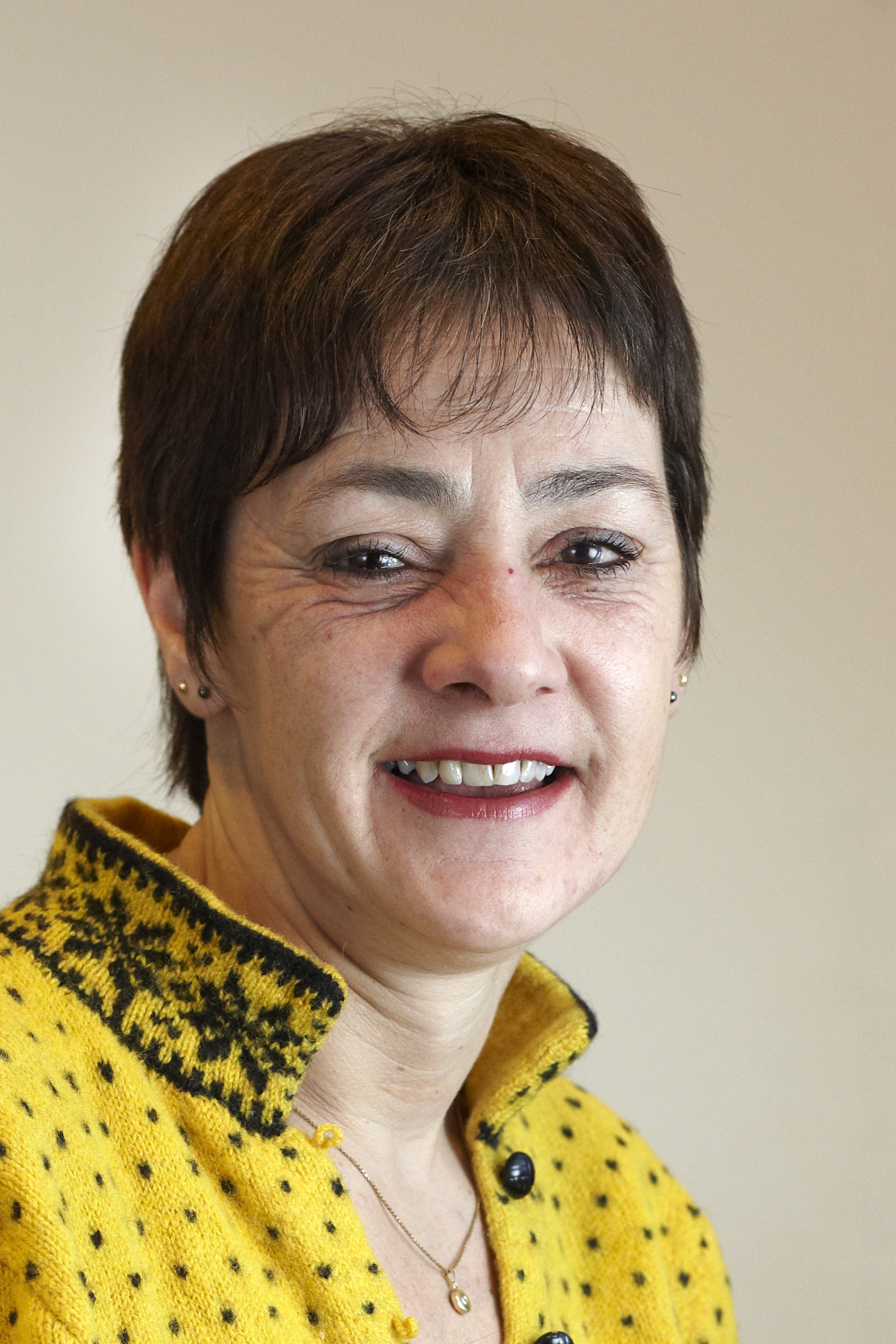
May Britt Vihovde, 2009

== Notable people ==
- Einar Økland (born 1940 in Sveio), a poet, playwright, essayist, and children's writer
- May Britt Vihovde (born 1958 in Sveio), a politician and former Member of Parliament
- Sigbjørn Apeland (born 1966), a scientist and musician, who plays organ and harmonium, was raised in Sveio
- Bjørn Berge (born 1968 in Sveio), a guitarist and blues artist
- Grutle Kjellson (born 1973 in Sveio), a bassist and vocalist in the progressive black metal band Enslaved
- Agnes Ravatn (born 1983), an author, columnist, and journalist who lived in Valevåg
- Cecilie Pedersen (born 1990 in Førde), a football striker
