= Agnes Ravatn =

Norwegian novelist, columnist and journalist

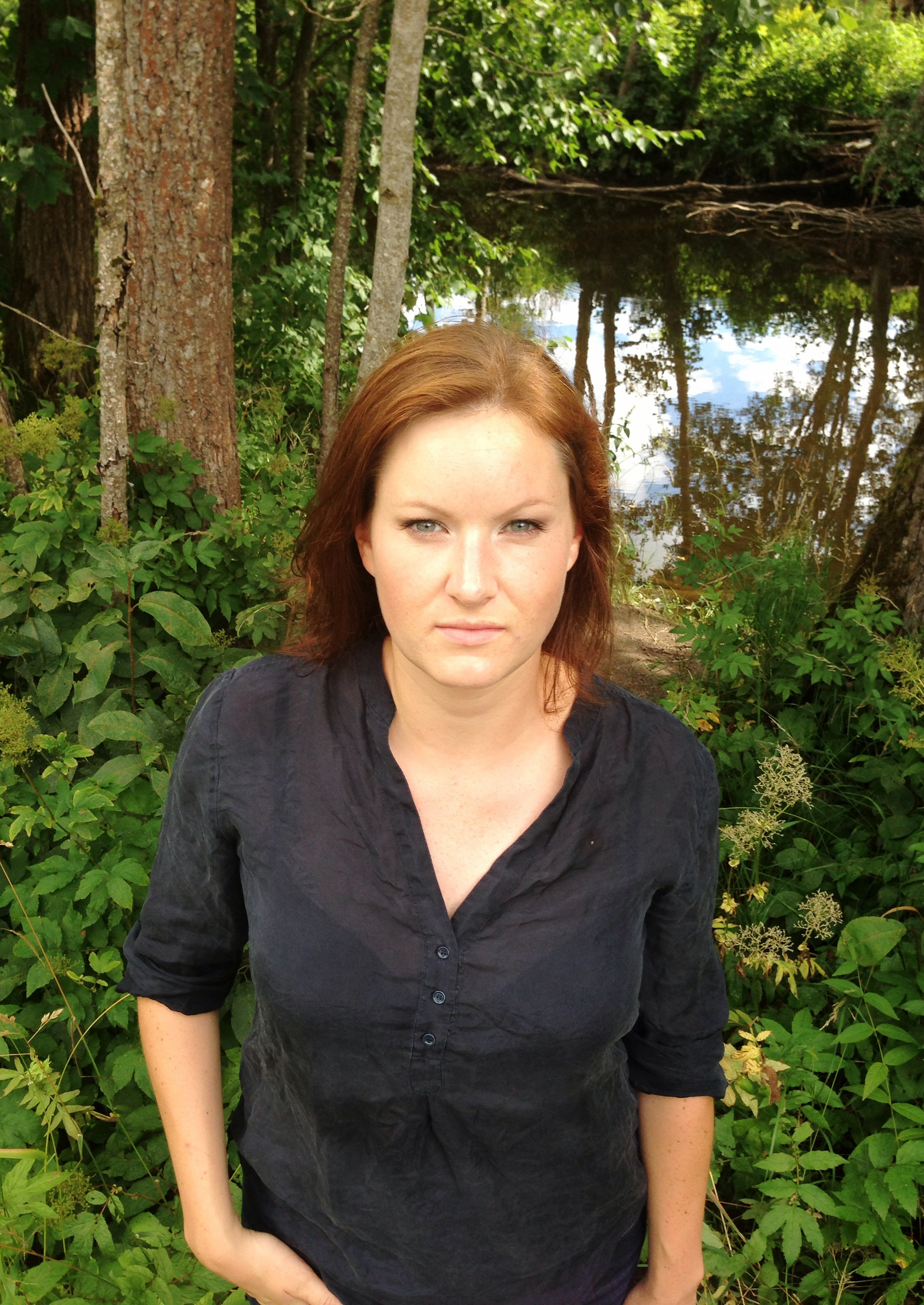
Norwegian columnist, journalist and novelist Agnes Ravatn

Agnes Ravatn (born 8 February 1983, in Ølen Municipality) is a Norwegian novelist, columnist and journalist.

She debuted in 2007 with the novel Veke 53 ('Week 53'). Ravatn is a columnist and journalist for Nynorsk newspaper Dag og Tid. A series of essays for the publication were released in 2009 as Stillstand ('Standstill'). In 2011 came her second books of essays, "Folkelesnad", on Norwegian magazines.

In 2013 she published the highly acclaimed novel "Fugletribunalet" ("The Bird Tribunal"), which has been released in eleven countries, including Great Britain, Germany and France. The novel has been adapted for theatre, and played for over two years at Det norske teatret. It is currently being made into a film. The English translation, by Rosie Hedger, was the first translated novel to be part of the «Fresh Talent»-program of booksellers WHSmith, and is nominated for the International Dublin Literary Award for 2018.

After moving to Valevåg in Sunnhordland, western Norway, Ravatn wrote the autobiographical "Verda er ein skandale" ("The World Is a Scandal") in 2017. The book is both a depiction of her family moving to a small, derelict farm in the countryside, and an interview with neighbour and fellow author Einar Økland. The chapters of the book were originally published as articles in Dag og Tid
