= Vigdarvatnet =

Lake in Vestland, Norway

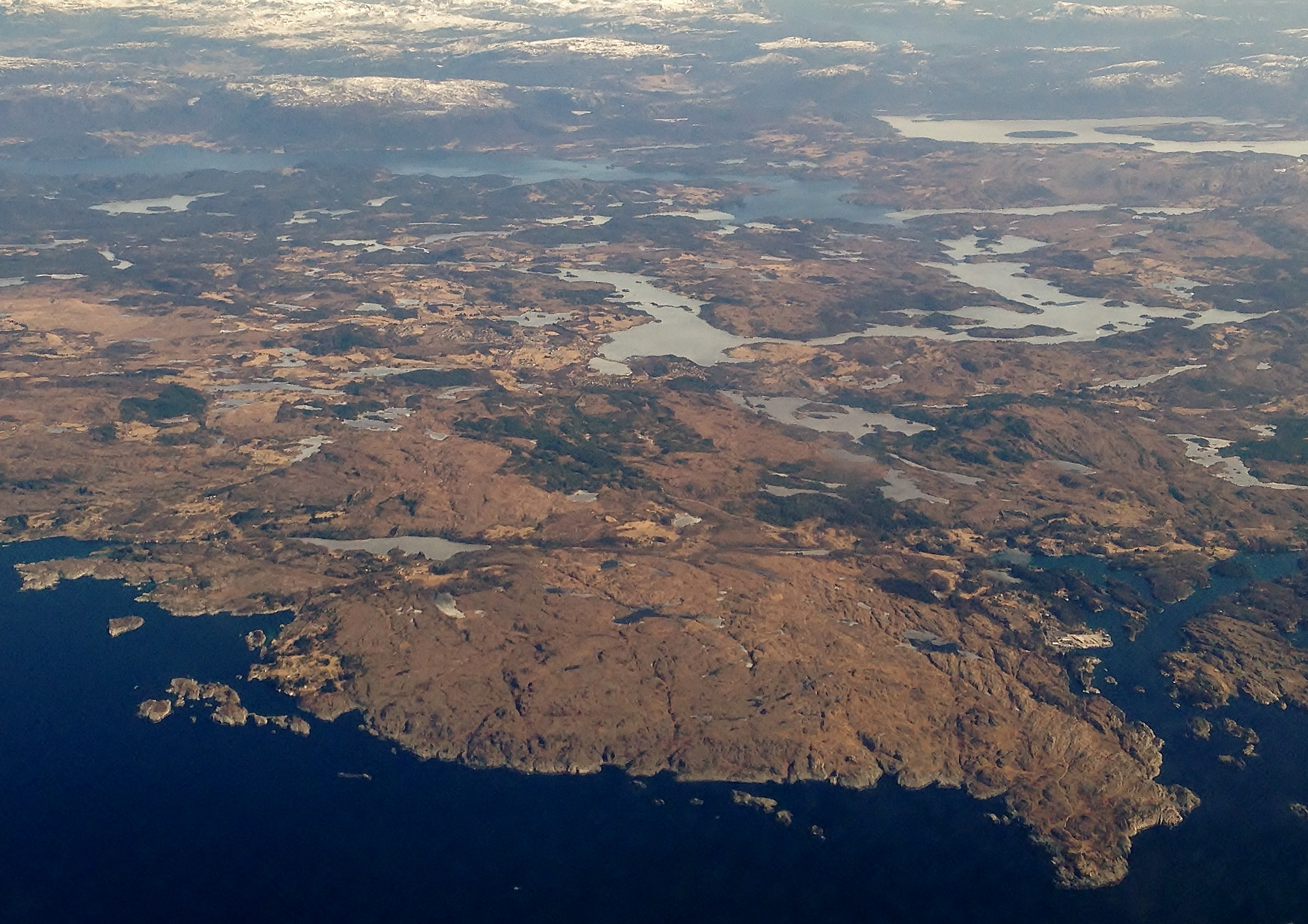
- Interactive map of Vigdarvatnet
- Location: Rogaland and Vestland
- Coordinates: 59.50824°N 5.38165°E
- Basin countries: Norway
- Max. length: 10 kilometres (6.2 mi)
- Max. width: 1.5 kilometres (0.93 mi)
- Surface area: 7.56 km^{2} (2.92 sq mi)
- Shore length^{1}: 44.52 kilometres (27.66 mi)
- Surface elevation: 10 metres (33 ft)
- Settlements: Sveio
- References: NVE
- ^{1} Shore length is not a well-defined measure.

Vigdarvatnet is a lake in Sveio Municipality in Vestland county, Norway. A small arm off the main lake juts to the south and runs along the municipal-county border between Sveio Municipality in Vestland county and Haugesund Municipality in Rogaland county. The 10-kilometre (6.2 mi) long lake forms a U-shape. It is fed by the nearby lake Stakkastadvatnet to the south, and it empties into the Ålfjorden, a small fjord arm off the main Hardangerfjorden. The village of Sveio lies on the northwestern shore of the lake.

== See also ==
- List of lakes in Norway
