= Valestrand Church =

Church in Vestland, Norway

- Valestrand kyrkje
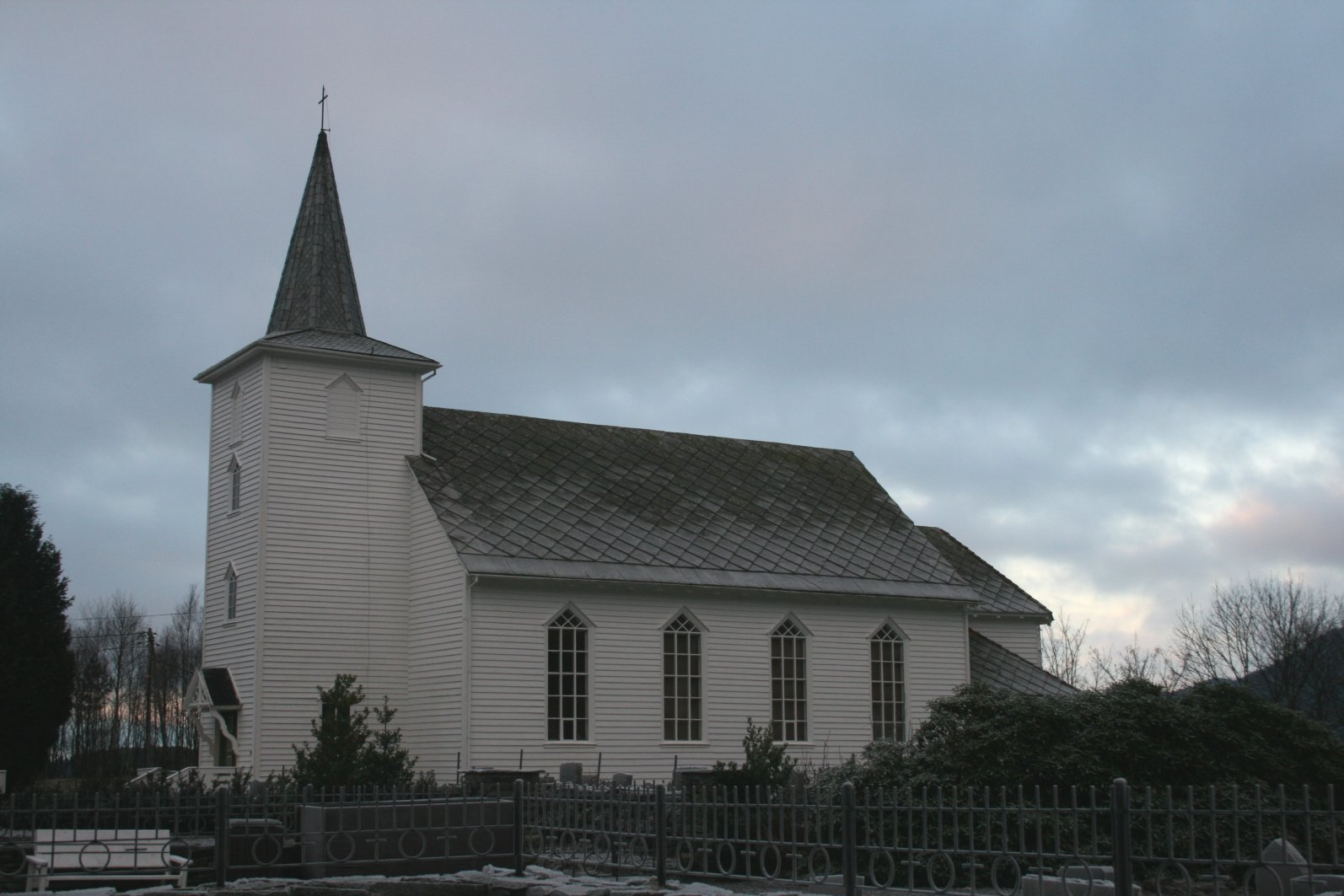
- View of the church
- Valestrand Church
- 59°40′30″N 5°28′01″E
- Location: Sveio Municipality, Vestland
- Country: Norway
- Denomination: Church of Norway
- Churchmanship: Evangelical Lutheran

History
- Status: Parish church
- Founded: 1873
- Consecrated: 17 Oct 1873

Architecture
- Functional status: Active
- Architect: Ole Vangberg
- Architectural type: Long church
- Completed: 1873 (153 years ago)

Specifications
- Capacity: 420
- Materials: Wood

Administration
- Diocese: Bjørgvin bispedømme
- Deanery: Sunnhordland prosti
- Parish: Valestrand og Førde
- Norwegian Cultural Heritage Site
- Type: Church
- Status: Not protected
- ID: 85746

Valestrand Church (Norwegian: Valestrand kyrkje) is a parish church of the Church of Norway in Sveio Municipality in Vestland county, Norway. It is located in the village of Valestrand, just south of the village of Valevåg. It is one of the churches for the Valestrand og Førde parish which is part of the Sunnhordland prosti (deanery) in the Diocese of Bjørgvin. The white, wooden church was built in a long church design in 1873 using plans drawn up by the architect Ole Vangberg. The church seats about 420 people.

== History ==
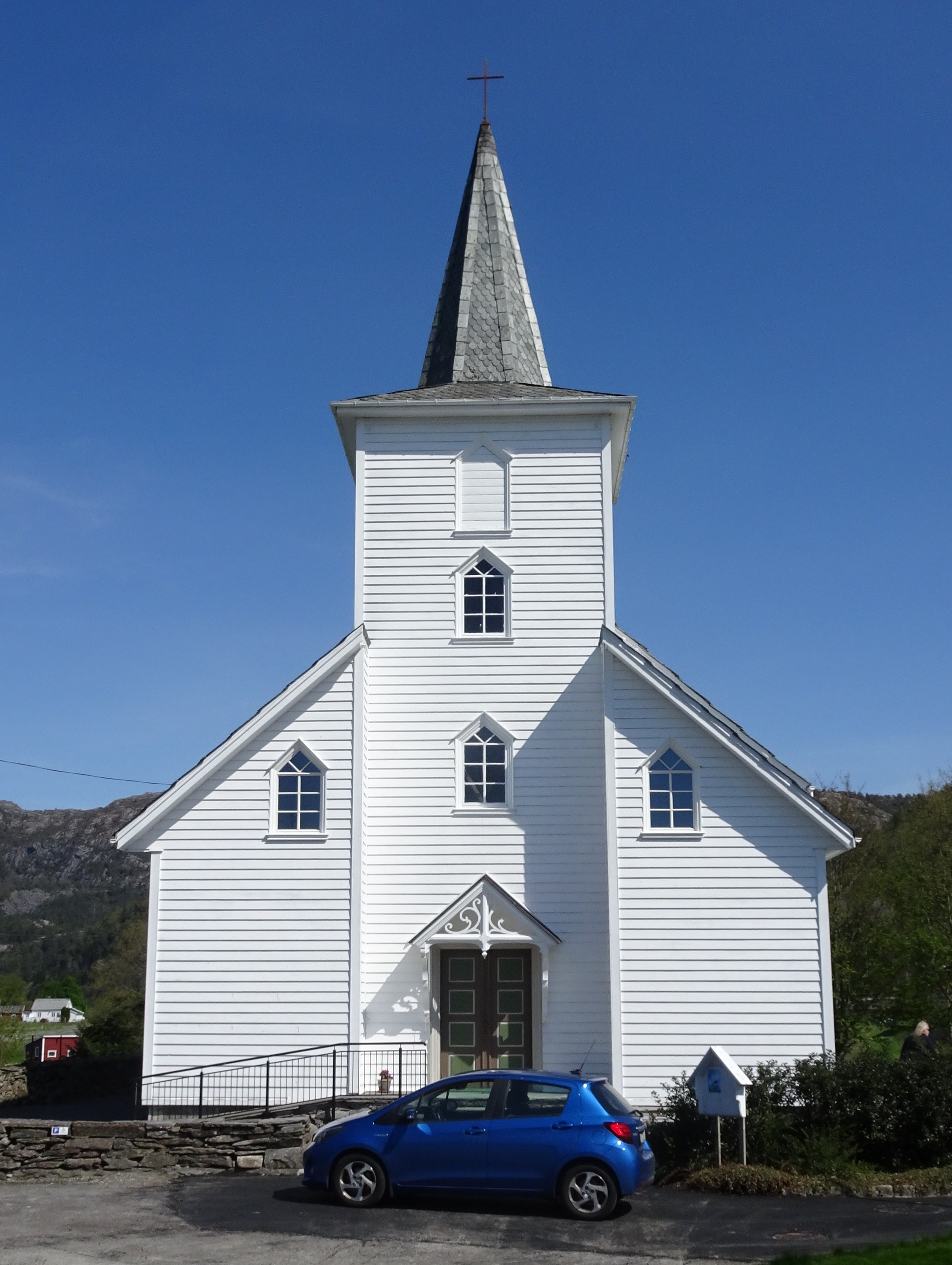
View of the front exterior of the building

The Valestrand area had historically been part of the Valen Church parish. By the 1870s, that church was too small and it was decided to build a new church. It was also decided to build the new church in a more central location for the parish, so it was built about 2.5 kilometres (1.6 mi) south of the old church site. The church was built by Jacobsen and Thorsen according to drawings by Ole Vangberg. The new church was consecrated on 15 October 1873 by the Bishop Peter Hersleb Graah Birkeland. The old Valen Church was then rebuilt as a schoolhouse.

== See also ==
- List of churches in Bjørgvin
