= May Britt Vihovde =

Norwegian politician

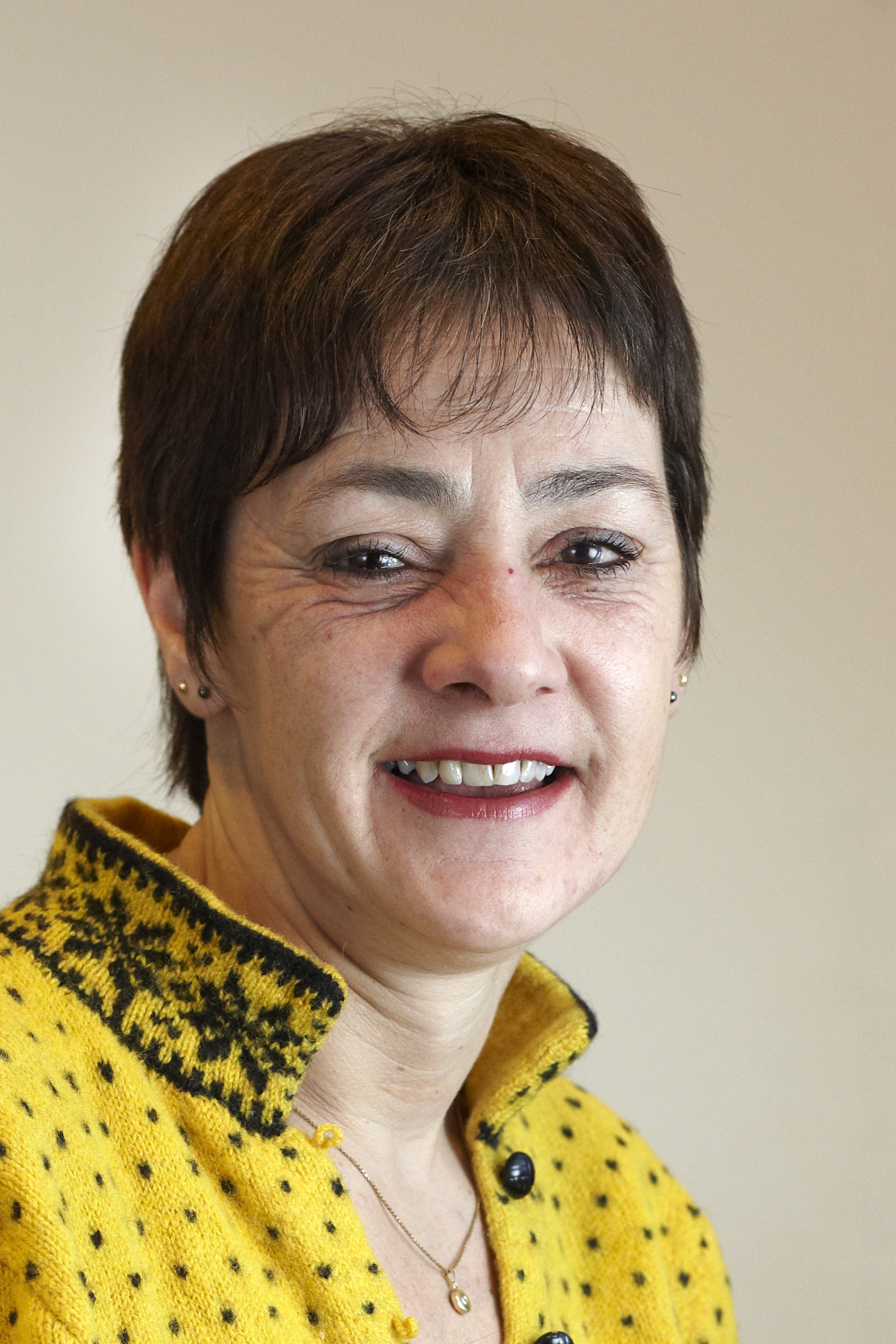
May Britt Vihovde

May Britt Vihovde (born 15 September 1958 in Sveio Municipality) is a Norwegian politician for the Liberal Party.

She was elected to the Norwegian Parliament from Hordaland in 1997, but was not re-elected in 2001. She served in the position of deputy representative during the terms 1993–1997, 2001–2005 and 2005–2009, but during the entire second term as deputy she sat as a regular representative, replacing Lars Sponheim who was appointed to the second cabinet Bondevik.

Vihovde was a member of the executive committee of the municipal council of Sveio Municipality in the periods 1987–1991 and 1995–1997.
