= Auklandshamn =

Village in Sveio Municipality, Norway

Auklandshamn Økland
- Village
- Interactive map of Auklandshamn
- Coordinates: 59.64291°N 5.38287°E
- Country: Norway
- Region: Western Norway
- County: Vestland
- District: Haugalandet
- Municipality: Sveio Municipality
- Elevation: 29 m (95 ft)
- Time zone: UTC+01:00 (CET)
  - Summer (DST): UTC+02:00 (CEST)
- Post Code: 5551 Auklandshamn

Auklandshamn or Økland is a village in Sveio Municipality in Vestland county, Norway. The village is located in the northern part of the traditional district of Haugaland, along the southern shore of the Bømlafjorden.

== History ==
The area was part of the old Finnaas Municipality, but it was transferred to Valestrand Municipality in 1870. In 1964, it was transferred to Sveio Municipality.

== Notable people ==
- Einar Vestvik, a journalist
- Irene Jacobsen, a journalist
