= Valevåg =

Village in Sveio Municipality, Norway

- Village
- Interactive map of Valevåg
- Coordinates: 59.69946°N 5.47241°E
- Country: Norway
- Region: Western Norway
- County: Vestland
- District: Sunnhordland
- Municipality: Sveio Municipality
- Elevation: 9 m (30 ft)
- Time zone: UTC+01:00 (CET)
  - Summer (DST): UTC+02:00 (CEST)
- Post Code: 5554 Valevåg

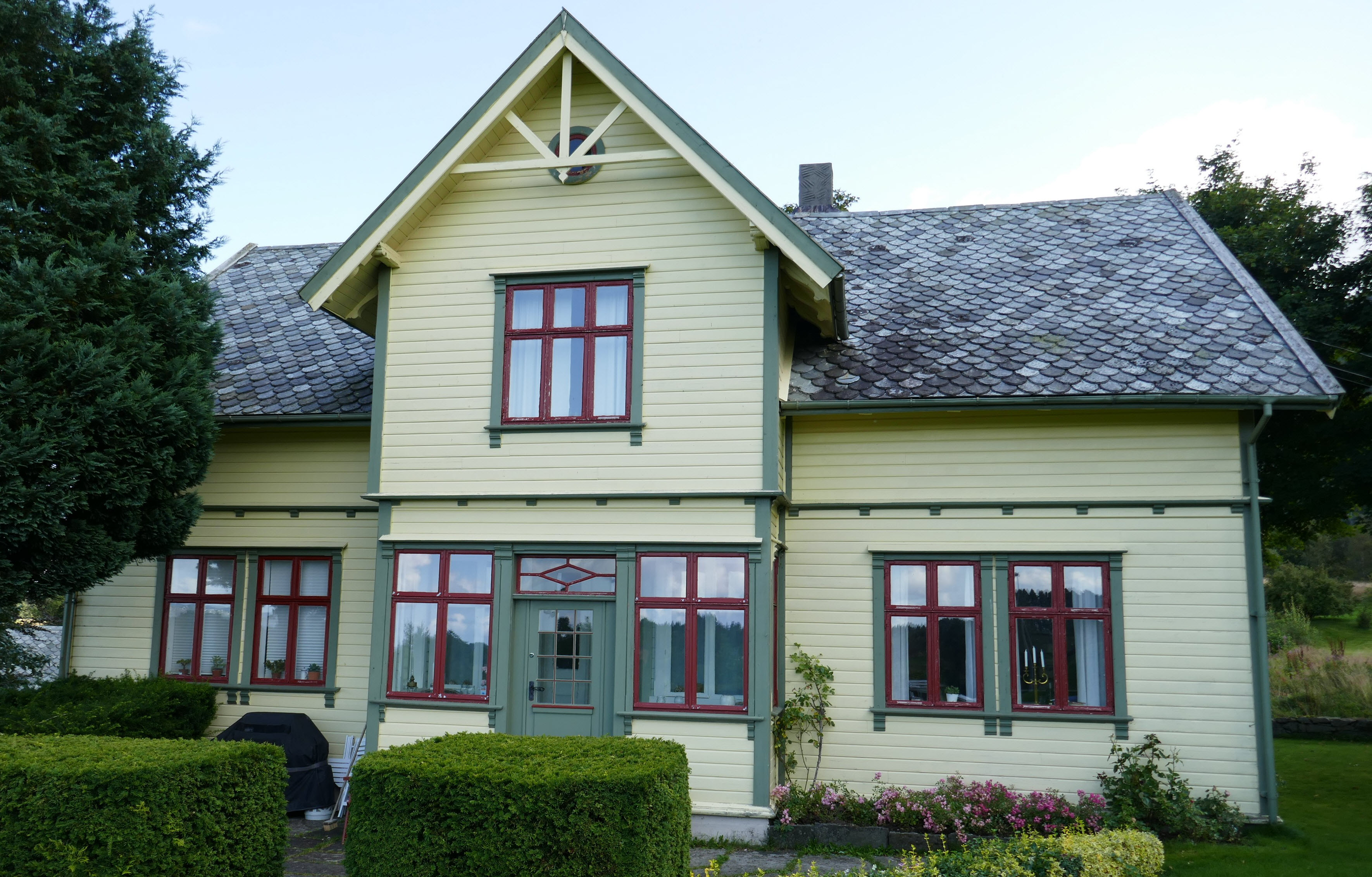
Home of composer Fartein Valen in Valevåg, Norway

Valevåg is a village in Sveio Municipality in Vestland county, Norway. The village is located on the northern end of the Sveio peninsula, along the southern shore of the Hardangerfjorden.

== History ==
Valevåg was the administrative centre of the old Valestrand Municipality until it was merged into Sveio Municipality in 1964. Valen Chapel (built in 1707) is in the village of Valevåg, and just outside the village to the south is the much larger Valestrand Church (built in 1873).

== Transportation ==
The village lies on the European route E39 highway, about 10 kilometres (6.2 mi) north of the village of Førde. The village was once a major ferry port connecting the mainland of Sveio to the islands of Stord Municipality (to the north via the Skjersholmane–Valevåg Ferry) and to Bømlo Municipality (to the west via the Mosterhamn–Valevåg Ferry). The ferries are no longer in operation since the opening of the Triangle Link bridge/tunnel network. The Bømlafjord Tunnel runs directly beneath the village before going under the fjord to the nearby islands.
