= Førde Church (Vestland) =

Church in Vestland, Norway

- Førde kyrkje
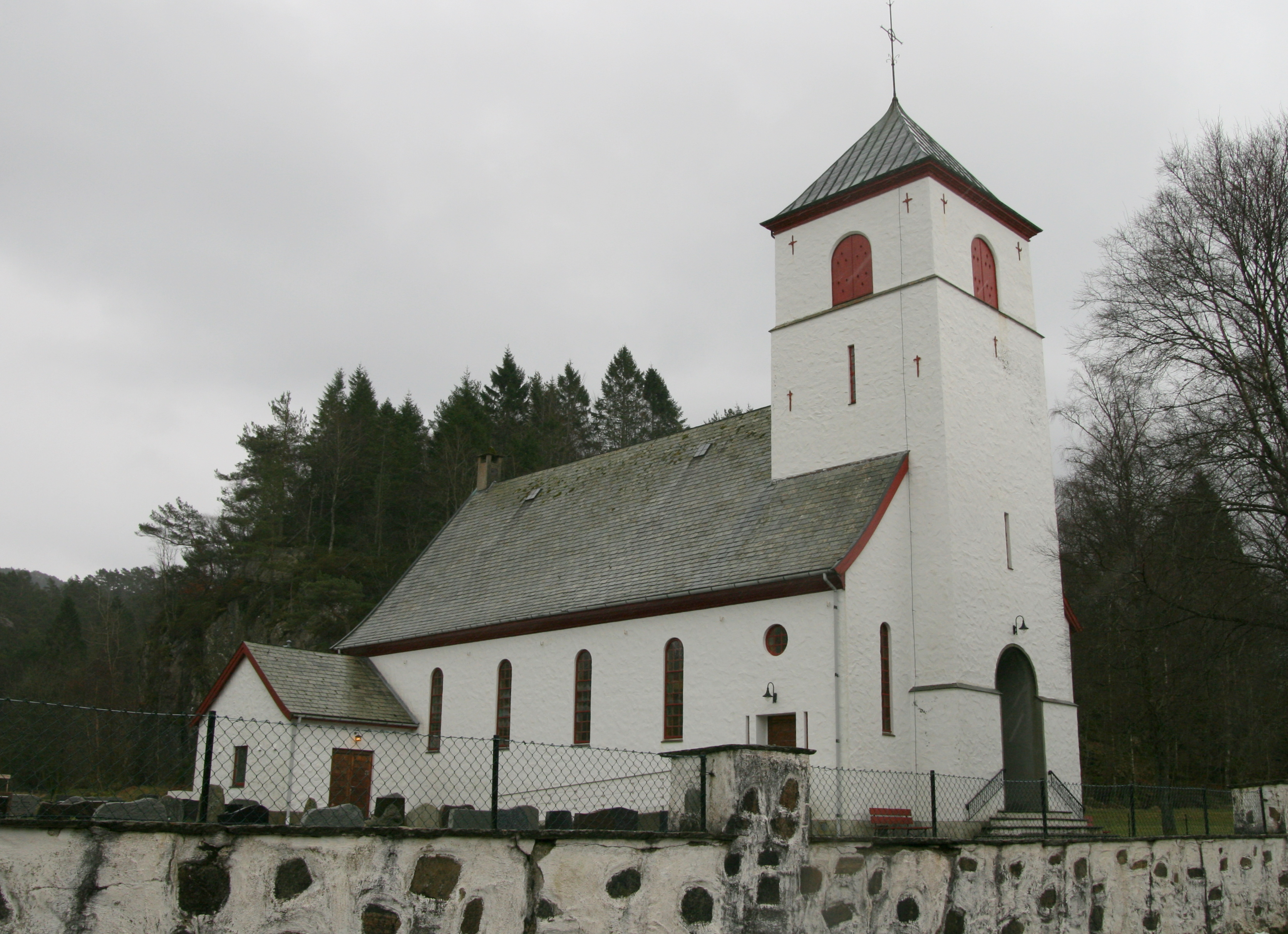
- View of the church
- Førde Church
- 59°36′45″N 5°28′50″E
- Location: Sveio Municipality, Vestland
- Country: Norway
- Denomination: Church of Norway
- Churchmanship: Evangelical Lutheran

History
- Former name: Vestre Vikebygd kyrkje
- Status: Parish church
- Founded: 1938
- Consecrated: 22 Sept 1938

Architecture
- Functional status: Active
- Architect: Torgeir Alvsaker
- Architectural type: Long church
- Completed: 1938 (88 years ago)

Specifications
- Capacity: 250
- Materials: Stone

Administration
- Diocese: Bjørgvin bispedømme
- Deanery: Sunnhordland prosti
- Parish: Valestrand og Førde
- Norwegian Cultural Heritage Site
- Type: Church
- Status: Not protected
- ID: 84221

Førde Church (Norwegian: Førde kyrkje) is a parish church of the Church of Norway in Sveio Municipality in Vestland county, Norway. It is located in the village of Førde. It is one of the churches for the Valestrand og Førde parish which is part of the Sunnhordland prosti (deanery) in the Diocese of Bjørgvin. The white, stone church was built in a long church design in 1938 using plans drawn up by the architect Torgeir Alvsaker. The church seats about 250 people.

== History ==
On 1 July 1935, the new parish of Vestre Vikebygd was established. Planning for a new church for the parish began soon after. On 4 March 1937, official permission was granted to construct the new church. Torgeir Alvsaker was hired to design the new building which was built in 1937–1938. The church was consecrated on 22 September 1938 by the Bishop Andreas Fleischer. The church was originally called Vestre Vikebygd Church. It was part of the old Vikebygd Municipality when it was constructed, and it served the western part of the municipality, hence the name (vestre means "western" in Norwegian). The municipalities of Vikebygd and Sveio were merged in 1964. On 1 July 1981, the name of the church and parish was changed to Førde Church to reflect the change in municipality.

== Media gallery ==
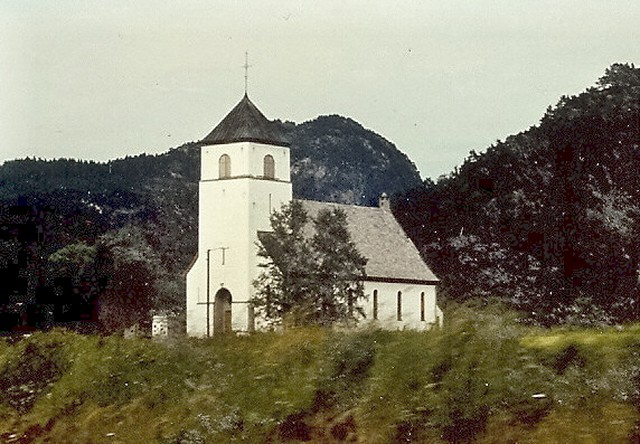

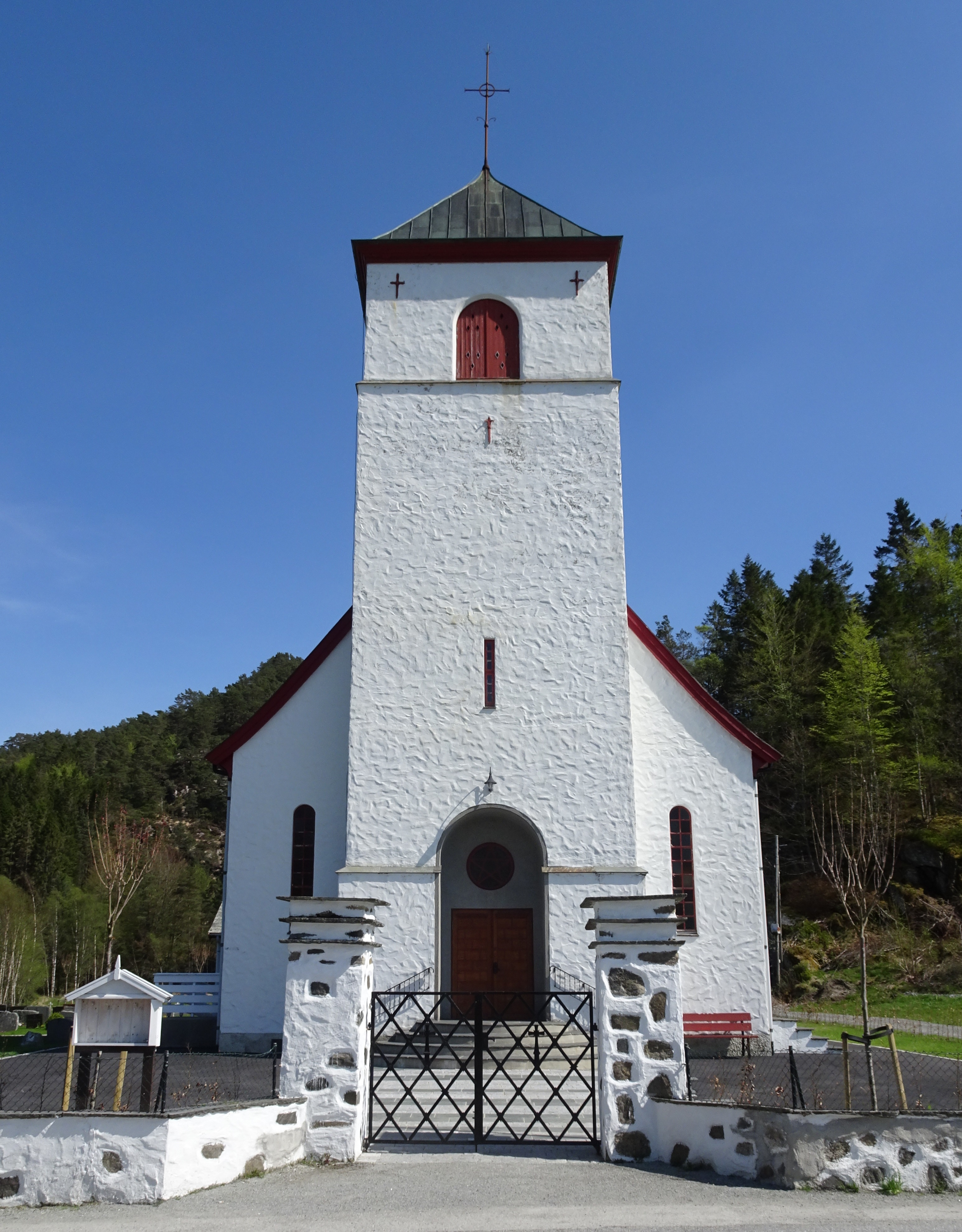

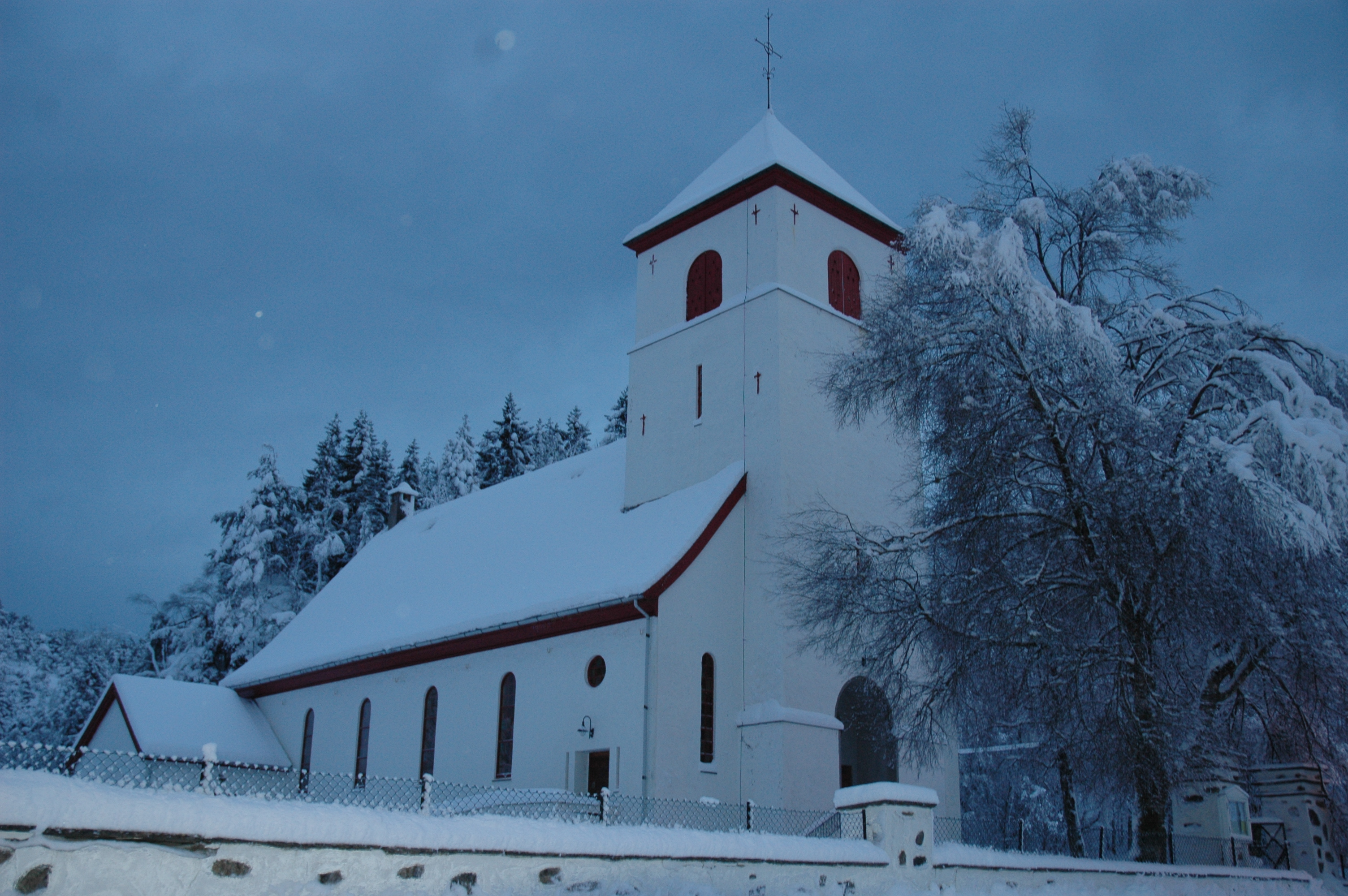

== See also ==
- List of churches in Bjørgvin
- Informationen zur Jehmlich Orgel
