= Sveio (village) =

Village in Sveio Municipality, Norway

- Village
- Interactive map of Sveio
- Coordinates: 59.54449°N 5.35699°E
- Country: Norway
- Region: Western Norway
- County: Vestland
- District: Sunnhordland
- Municipality: Sveio Municipality

Area
  - Total: 1.01 km^{2} (0.39 sq mi)
- Elevation: 36 m (118 ft)

Population (2025)
  - Total: 1,536
  - Density: 1,521/km^{2} (3,940/sq mi)
- Time zone: UTC+01:00 (CET)
  - Summer (DST): UTC+02:00 (CEST)
- Post Code: 5550 Sveio

Sveio is the administrative centre of Sveio Municipality in Vestland county, Norway. The village is located on the northwestern shore of the lake Vigdarvatnet, about half-way between the villages of Våga and Førde. The village lies along Norwegian County Road 47. Sveio Church is located here. The newspaper Vestavind has been published in Sveio since 1986.

The 1.01-square-kilometre (250-acre) village has a population (2025) of 1,536 and a population density of 1,521 inhabitants per square kilometre (3,940/sq mi).
