= Aukland (surname) =

Aukland is a Norwegian surname, and may refer to:

- Anders Aukland (born 1972), Norwegian cross country skier
- Jørgen Aukland (born 1975), Norwegian cross-country skier
- Knut Aukland (1929–2014), Norwegian physiologist
- Lisa Aukland (born 1957), American professional bodybuilder and powerlifter
