= Valen Chapel =

Church in Vestland, Norway

- Valen kapell
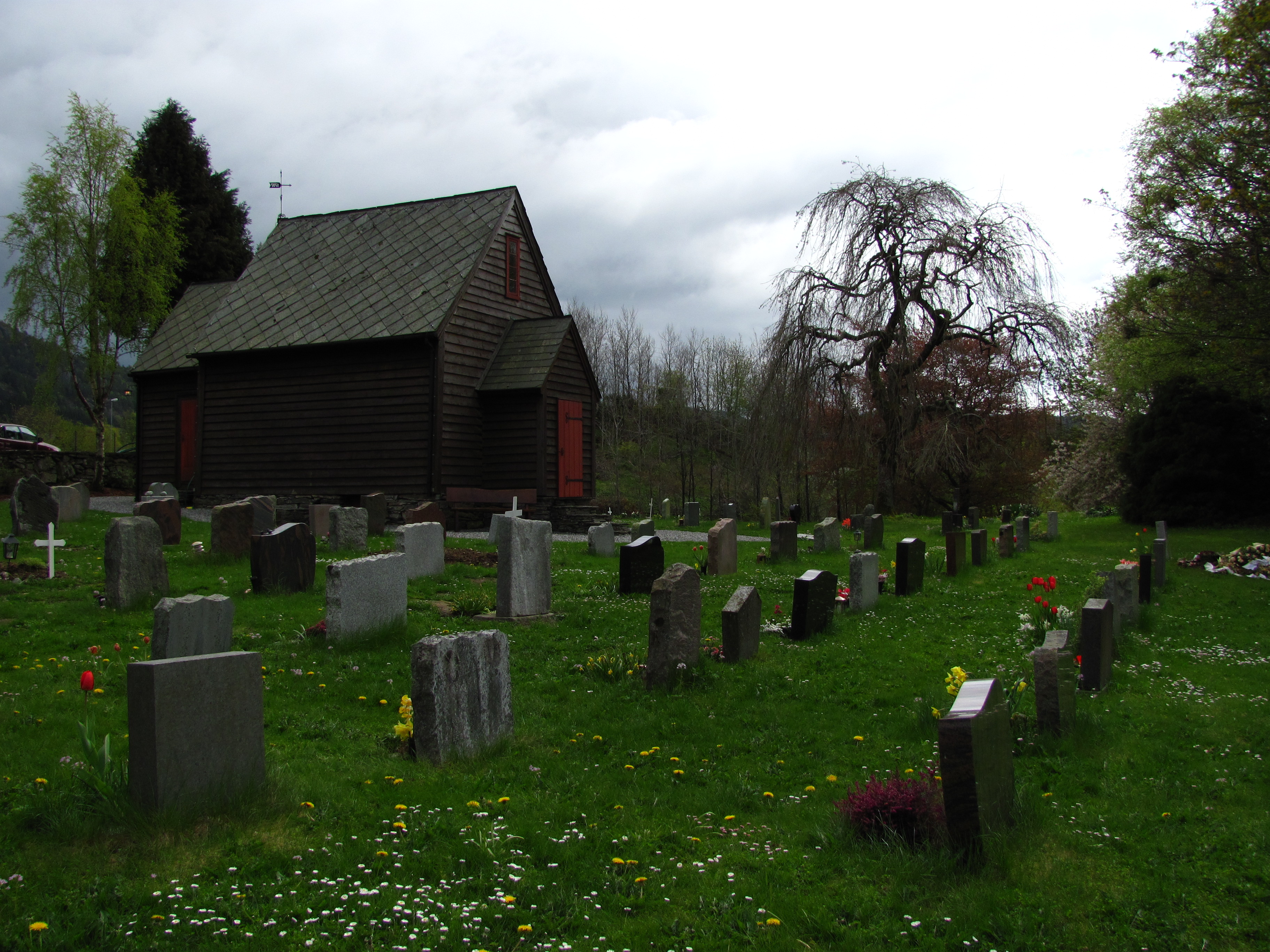
- View of the church
- Valen Chapel
- 59°41′42″N 5°28′34″E
- Location: Sveio Municipality, Vestland
- Country: Norway
- Denomination: Church of Norway
- Previous denomination: Catholic Church
- Churchmanship: Evangelical Lutheran

History
- Status: Parish church
- Founded: 13th century
- Consecrated: 31 July 1949

Architecture
- Functional status: Active
- Architectural type: Long church
- Completed: 1707 (319 years ago)
- Closed: 1873-1949

Specifications
- Capacity: 50
- Materials: Wood

Administration
- Diocese: Bjørgvin bispedømme
- Deanery: Sunnhordland prosti
- Parish: Valestrand og Førde
- Norwegian Cultural Heritage Site
- Type: Church
- Status: Automatically protected
- ID: 85745

Valen Chapel (Norwegian: Valen kapell) is a parish church of the Church of Norway in Sveio Municipality in Vestland county, Norway. It is located in the village of Valevåg. It one of the churches for the Valestrand og Førde parish which is part of the Sunnhordland prosti (deanery) in the Diocese of Bjørgvin. The small, brown, wooden church was built in a long church design in 1707 using plans drawn up by an unknown architect. The church seats about 50 people. The small church is now only used for special situations, although it sits on a church site that has been in use for centuries.

== History ==
The earliest existing historical records of the church date back to the year 1350, but it was not built that year. That first church in Valen was a wooden stave church that was likely built during the 13th century. In 1707, the old church was torn down and a new timber-framed long church was built on the same site. In 1872, it was decided to build a new, larger church just south of the village of Valevåg, about 2.5 kilometres (1.6 mi) south of the chapel. The new Valestrand Church was completed in 1873. The old church was then extensively renovated and turned into a schoolhouse. The school operated in the building until 1938. After that time, the building was renovated again and re-consecrated for church use on 31 July 1949 and is now known as Valen Chapel.

== See also ==
- List of churches in Bjørgvin
