= Nils Økland (Esperantist) =

Norwegian Esperantist and teacher

Nils Andreas Økland (10 June 1882 – 1969) was a Norwegian Esperantist and teacher in Stord Municipality, Norway. He spent some years in his youth on the island of Utsira, where his father was a school teacher. Nils Økland was married to Hanna Olava Bergstøl, and they had 3 sons. His father Matthias Larsen Økland (b. 1844) was also a school teacher and a church chorister; his mother was Signi Nilsdatter (b. 1853) from Eidsvåg. Having learned Esperanto indirectly through his friend Haldor Midthus by 1904, he served as president on the executive council of Stord's Norwegian Esperanto League branch.

== Brief biography ==
Born in Valestrand Municipality in 1882, Økland was confirmed in the Evangelical Lutheran Church in 1896; the parish priest made particular note of his "knowledge, diligence and conduct with distinction." By 1900 he was a student at a Stord teachers training college.

Beginning in the spring of 1904, Økland taught Esperanto courses at the Bethania Waisenhus in Stavanger. Under the direction of the Stavanger parish priest, the Bethania complex, housing about 150 orphans in three asylum buildings and a further 20 to 30 young offenders in a separate youth detention center on Lindøy, operated a printing shop producing newspapers, religious tracts and books.

In the early period of the movement's growth he propagated the planned language among his colleagues and through newspaper and magazine articles. In 1910 and 1912 he taught adult Esperanto courses in Haugesund, and in 1932 he taught a children's Esperanto course in Stord. Økland was a school inspector in Rogaland for some years. He was also the mayor (ordførar) of Stord Municipality from 1932 to 1934, representing the party Venstre.

== Author ==
Økland wrote a book of poetry, Heime og ute, (Home and abroad), published in Kristiania (Oslo) by Olaf Norlis forlag in 1917. This book contains 27 poems, and it includes translations of Johann Wolfgang von Goethe and Heinrich Heine.

In 1940 he wrote a short biography of David Livingstone, published by Norsk Bokreidingslag in Bergen. Both books were written in nynorsk.

== Øklandhuset ==
During his time as the schoolteacher in Haugesund, Økland had had a simple house built just west of the school. After World War II that house, still known as Øklandhuset ("Økland's house") was owned by Sofie Håland, who lived on the main floor and rented out the other two floors to Agnes Vikshåland, a seamstress. She kept her sewing studio in the attic and also operated a store in the basement.

Økland died in Haugesund.
