= Førde, Sveio =

Village in Sveio Municipality, Norway

Førde
- Village
- Interactive map of Førde
- Coordinates: 59.60931°N 5.47586°E
- Country: Norway
- Region: Western Norway
- County: Vestland
- District: Sunnhordland
- Municipality: Sveio Municipality
- Elevation: 33 m (108 ft)
- Time zone: UTC+01:00 (CET)
  - Summer (DST): UTC+02:00 (CEST)
- Post Code: 5555 Førde i Hordaland

Førde is a village in Sveio Municipality in Vestland county, Norway. The village is located at the southern end of the Førdespollen bay, off of the main Bømlafjorden. The European route E39 highway runs through the village on its way between the cities of Stavanger and Bergen. The village is the site of Førde Church.
