= Sveio Church =

Church in Vestland, Norway

- Sveio kyrkje
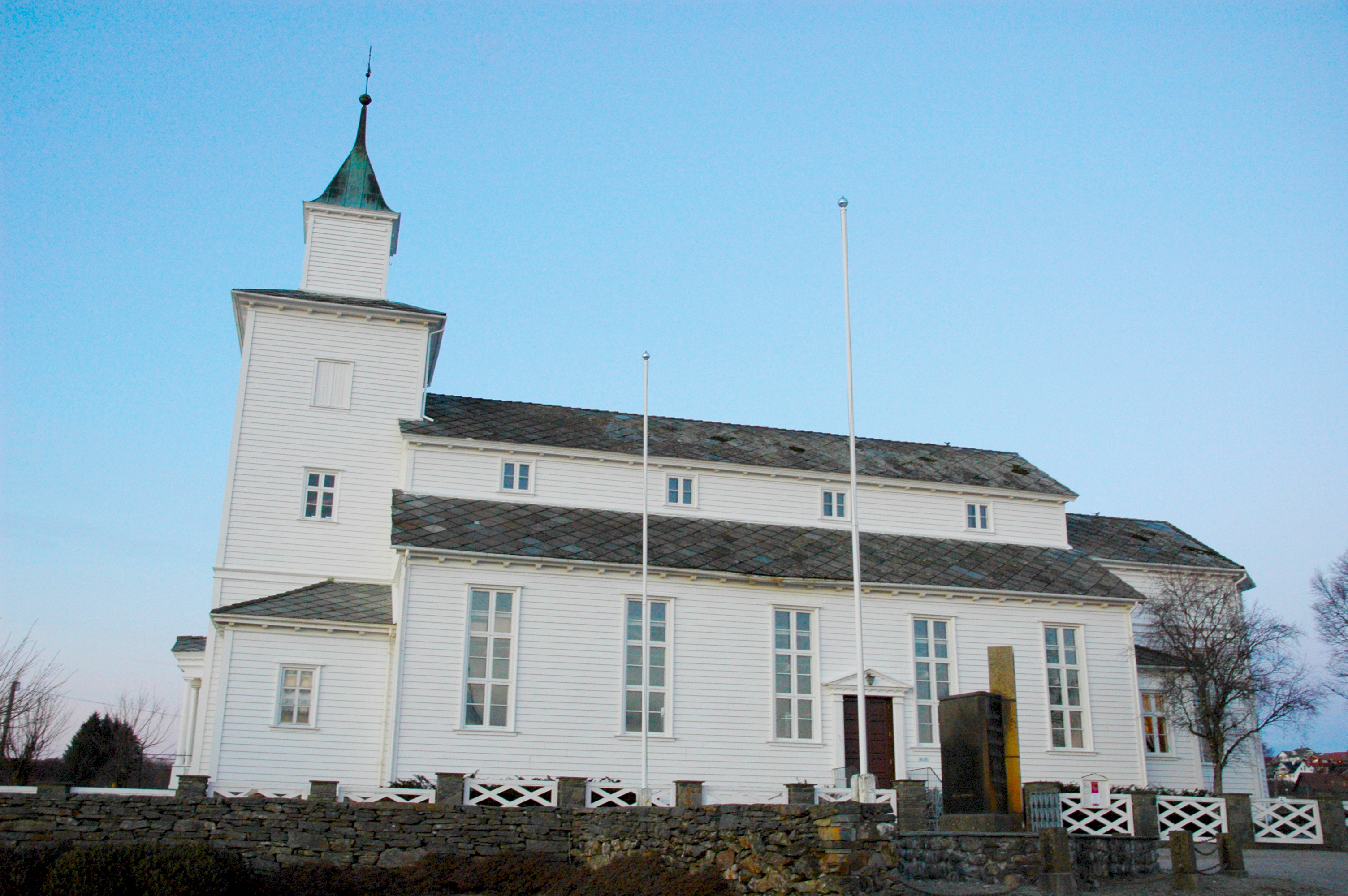
- View of the church in 2015
- Sveio Church
- 59°32′36″N 5°21′05″E
- Location: Sveio Municipality, Vestland
- Country: Norway
- Denomination: Church of Norway
- Previous denomination: Catholic Church
- Churchmanship: Evangelical Lutheran

History
- Status: Parish church
- Founded: 14th century
- Consecrated: 22 Aug 1858

Architecture
- Functional status: Active
- Architect: Andreas Grønning
- Architectural type: Long church
- Completed: 1858 (168 years ago)

Specifications
- Capacity: 630
- Materials: Wood

Administration
- Diocese: Bjørgvin bispedømme
- Deanery: Sunnhordland prosti
- Parish: Sveio
- Norwegian Cultural Heritage Site
- Type: Church
- Status: Listed
- ID: 85011

Sveio Church (Norwegian: Sveio kyrkje) is a parish church of the Church of Norway in Sveio Municipality in Vestland county, Norway. It is located in the village of Sveio. It is the church for the Sveio parish which is part of the Sunnhordland prosti (deanery) in the Diocese of Bjørgvin. The white, wooden church was built in a long church design in 1858 using plans drawn up by the architect Andreas Grønning. The church seats about 630 people.

== History ==
The earliest existing historical records of the church date back to the year 1686, but at that time it was described as an old, dilapidated stave church without a tower (Norwegian: een liden Vdgammel och i Grund forfalden Stafuekirche uden Taarn). The first church in Sveio was a wooden stave church that was possibly built during the 14th century. Originally, it was located on the west side of Sveiahaugen, about 250 metres (820 ft) west of the present-day location. It had an open air corridor built all the way around the building. The church was surrounded by a 30 by 30 metres (98 ft × 98 ft) cemetery.

In 1688, that church was torn down and a new timber-framed church was built by the builder Oluff Bysemb from Osterøy. The new church was located slightly to the west of the previous church, but still located inside the cemetery. The new church was partially constructed with salvaged materials from the previous building.

After about 170 years, the church was too small for the congregation, so it was decided to tear down the old church and build a new one. In 1858, a new church was built on the east side of Sveiahaugen, about 250 metres (820 ft) east of the historic location of the church. The new, wooden church was consecrated on 22 August 1858.

== See also ==
- List of churches in Bjørgvin
