= Aukland, Lindesnes =

Village in Lindesnes Municipality, Norway

Aukland Augland
- Village
- Interactive map of Aukland
- Coordinates: 58.21909°N 7.37109°E
- Country: Norway
- Region: Southern Norway
- County: Agder
- District: Lindesnes
- Municipality: Lindesnes Municipality
- Elevation: 274 m (899 ft)
- Time zone: UTC+01:00 (CET)
  - Summer (DST): UTC+02:00 (CEST)
- Post Code: 4520 Lindesnes

Aukland is a village in Lindesnes Municipality in Agder county, Norway. The village is located 1.8 kilometres (1.1 mi) east of the village of Tryland and about 2.7 kilometres (1.7 mi) north of the village of Vigmostad.

== Name ==
Aukland derives from auke — augeland, which can be translated into increase of land or expansion of hayfields. After hay was cut, farmers in Tryland rowed up the hay, and thus, increase their land, because Augland farm is likely secreted from Tryland.
