= Einar Økland =

Norwegian poet, playwright, essayist and children's writer

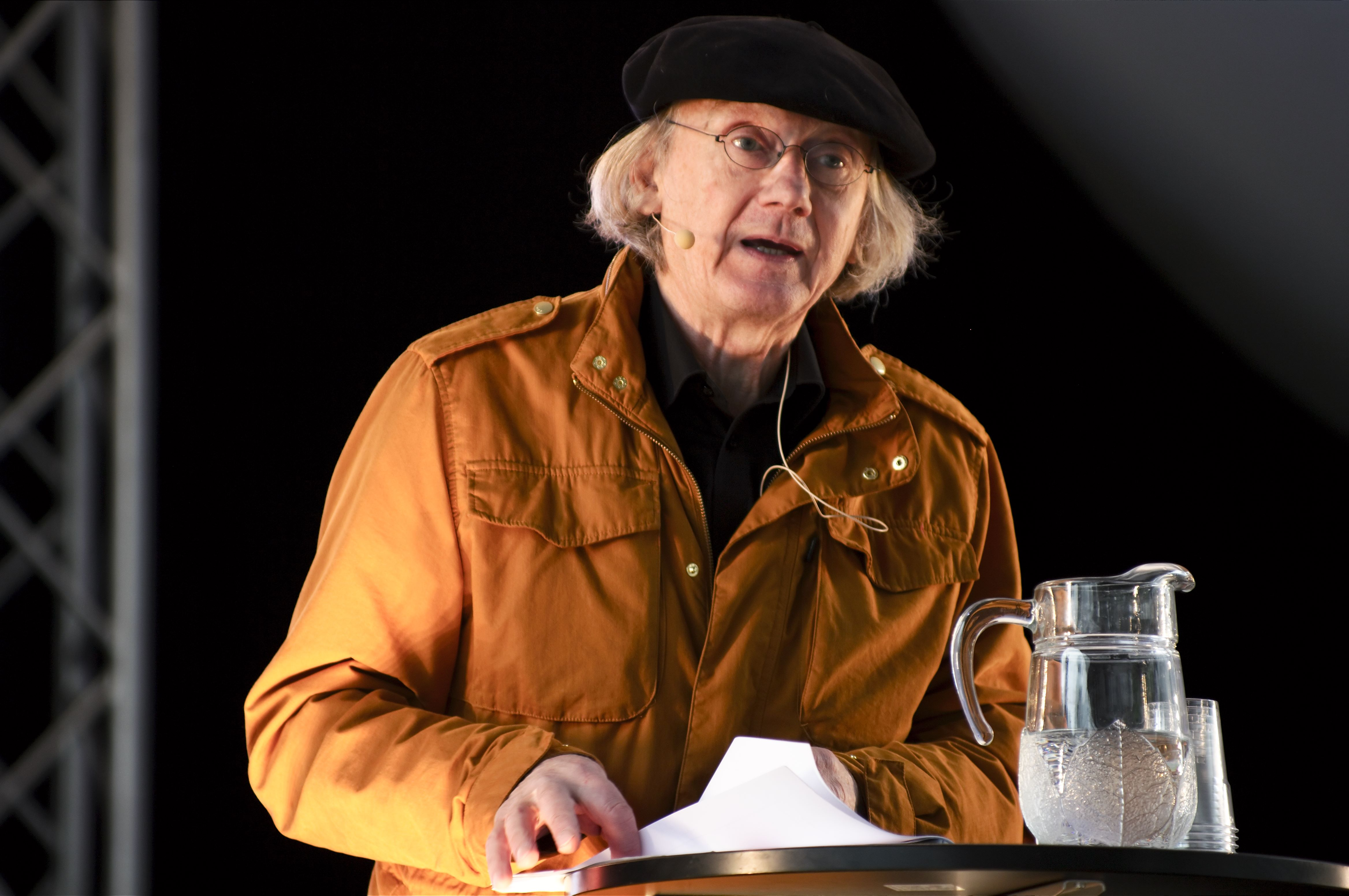
- Einar Økland in 2011
- Born: 17 January 1940 (age 86)
- Occupations: Poet, playwright, essayist and children's writer

Einar Økland (born 17 January 1940) is a Norwegian poet, playwright, essayist and children's writer.

He was born in Sveio Municipality, and educated psychologist.

He made his literary debut in 1963, with the poetry collection Ein gul dag. He was awarded the Melsom Prize 1991 for Når ikkje anna er sagt, and the Dobloug Prize in 2000.

== Drama ==
- Aberfan – drama (1969); NRK's magazine program Teaterspeilet featured excerpts from the original production at Bikuben stage in Oslo, with the roles played by Gudrun Waadeland, Sverre Holm, and Bente Liseth (later changed her name to Bente Børsum).
- Georg: Sit du godt? – drama (1968) (Together with Dag Solstad)
- Noah – play (2003)

== Awards ==
- Norwegian Critics Prize for Literature 1978
- Aschehoug Prize 1988
- Melsom Prize 1992
- Nynorsk Literature Prize 1993
- Dobloug Prize 2000
- Gyldendal Prize 2007
- Språkprisen 2015
- Brage Prize Honorary Award 2015
