= Bømlafjorden =

Fjord in Vestland, Norway

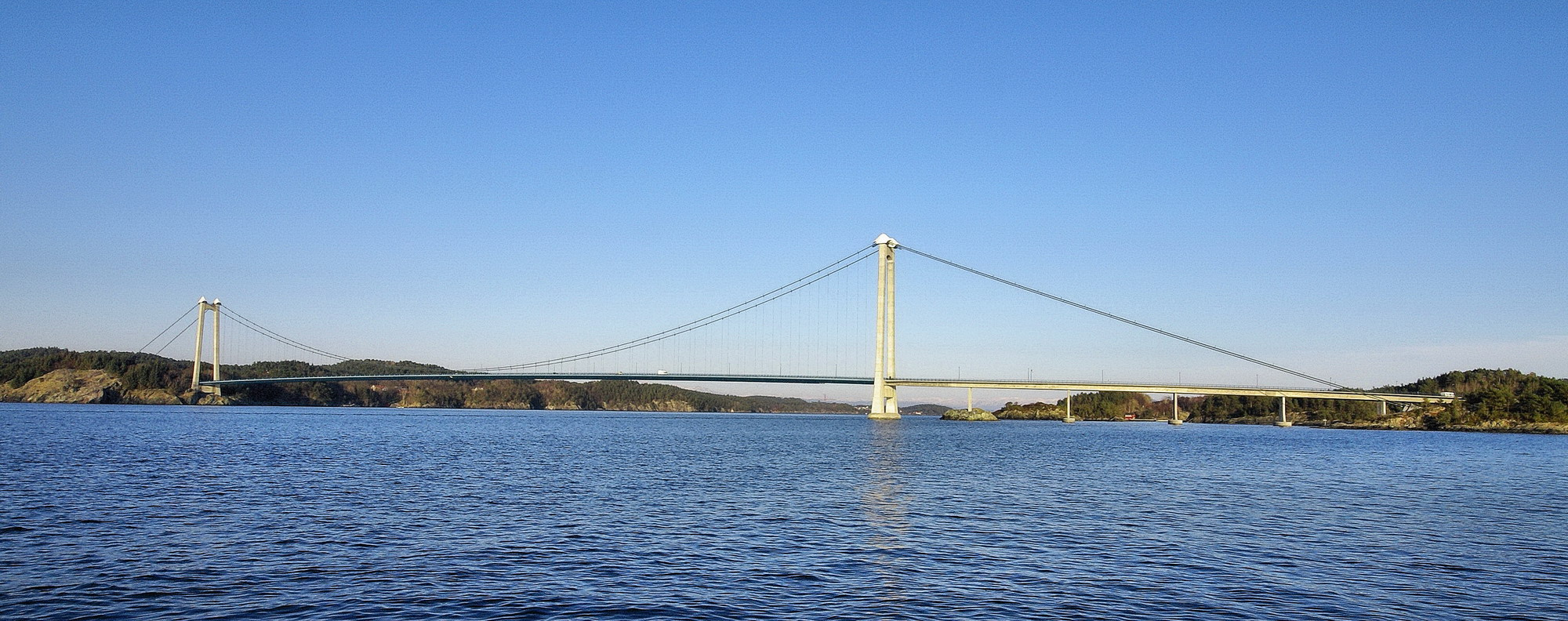
- View of the fjord and the Stord Bridge
- Interactive map of the fjord
- Location: Vestland county, Norway
- Coordinates: 59°38′N 5°17′E
- Type: Fjord
- Primary inflows: Hardangerfjorden
- Basin countries: Norway
- Max. length: 30 kilometres (19 mi)

Bømlafjorden (English: Bømla Fjord) is a fjord in Vestland county, Norway. The fjord is the outer-most part of the Hardangerfjord, running between the island of Bømlo (in Bømlo Municipality) and the mainland (Sveio Municipality). The Bømlafjord Tunnel crosses under Bømlafjorden.

== History ==
King Magnus IV of Sweden and Norway drowned in a shipwreck in the fjord in 1374.

On February 21, 1945, the vessel D/S Austri was attacked by British aircraft and sunk in the fjord. The passengers included German military personnel, prisoners of war, and civilian passengers, among them the judge and newspaperman Gerhard Jynge.

== See also ==
- List of Norwegian fjords
