= Kvinnherad =

Kvinnherad may refer to:

== Places ==
- Kvinnherad Municipality, a municipality in Vestland county, Norway
- Kvinnherad Church, a church in Kvinnherad Municipality in Vestland county, Norway
- Kvinnherad Fjord, a part of the Hardangerfjorden in Vestland county, Norway

== Other ==
- Kvinnherad Project, a mining project in Kvinnherad Municipality in Vestland county, Norway
- MF Kvinnherad, a car ferry that runs between Skånevik-Matre-Utåker in Vestland county, Norway
