= Hellesøy =

Hellesøy may refer to:

== Places ==
- Hellesøy, Stavanger, an island in the municipality of Stavanger in Rogaland county, Norway
- Hellesøy, Kragerø, an island in the municipality of Kragerø in Telemark county, Norway
- Hellesøy, or Hellesøyna, an island in the municipality of Øygarden in Vestland county, Norway
- Hellesøy Lighthouse, or Hellisøy Lighthouse, a lighthouse in the municipality of Fedje in Vestland county, Norway

== Other ==
- Hellesøy Verft, a small shipbuilding company with a shipyard in Kvinnherad, Vestland county, Norway
