= Bondhusbrea =

Glacier in Norway

- Bondhusbreen
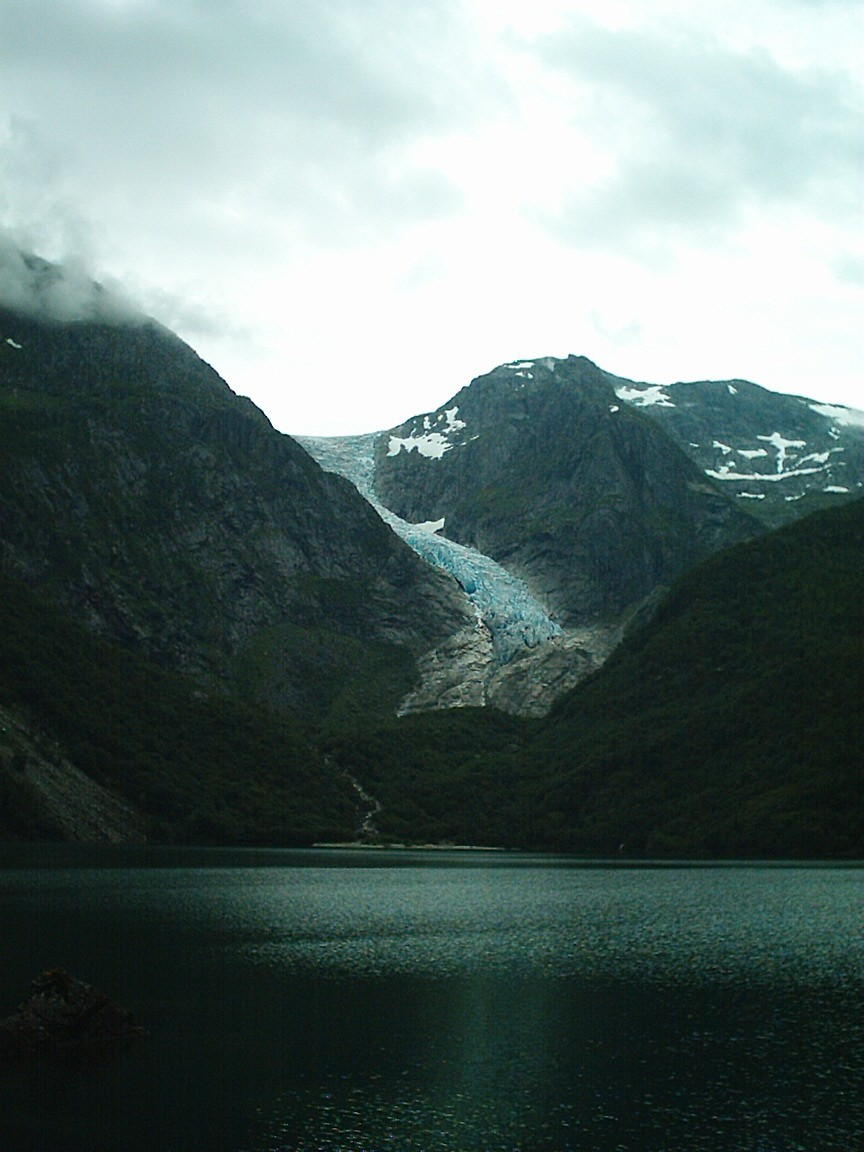
- Interactive map of Bondhusbrea
- Location: Vestland, Norway
- Coordinates: 60°03′24″N 06°18′50″E
- Length: 4 km (2.5 mi)

Bondhusbrea is a glacier in Kvinnherad Municipality in Vestland county, Norway. The glacier is an offshoot of the vast Folgefonna glacier, and it lies inside the Folgefonna National Park. The glacier has a length of around 4 kilometres (2.5 mi) and a height difference of about 1,100 metres (3,600 ft) from its highest to its lowest points.

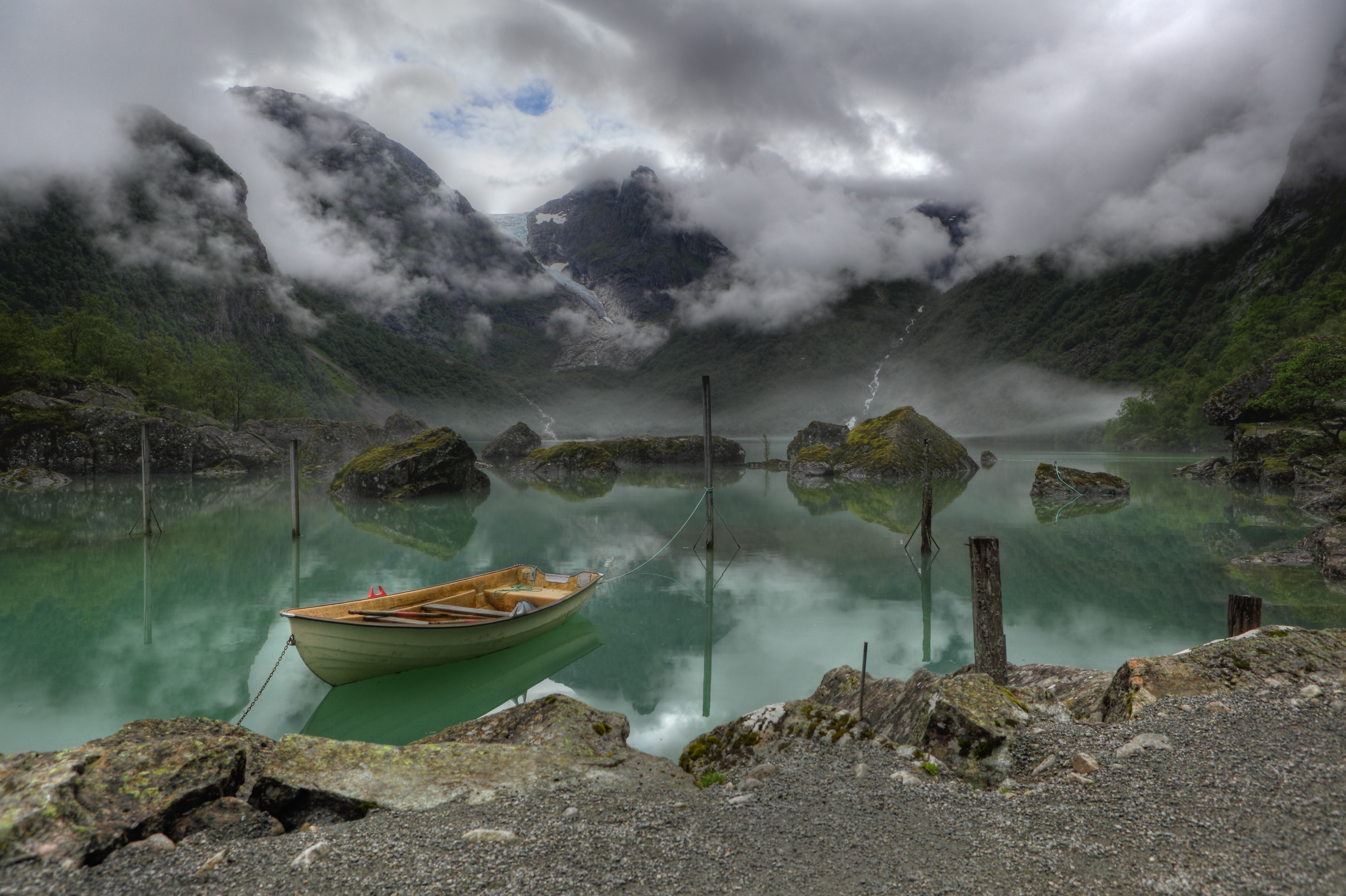
Lake Bondhus, glacier Bondhusbrea in the background as a part of the Folgefonna Glacier

The glacier is located at the end of the small Bondhusdalen valley, just south of the village of Sunndal on the shore of the Maurangsfjorden. Water draining under the glacier is caught through a tunnel and exploited in the Mauranger Hydroelectric Power Station.

== See also ==
- List of glaciers in Norway
