= Blådalsvatnet =

Glacial lake in Vestland, Norway

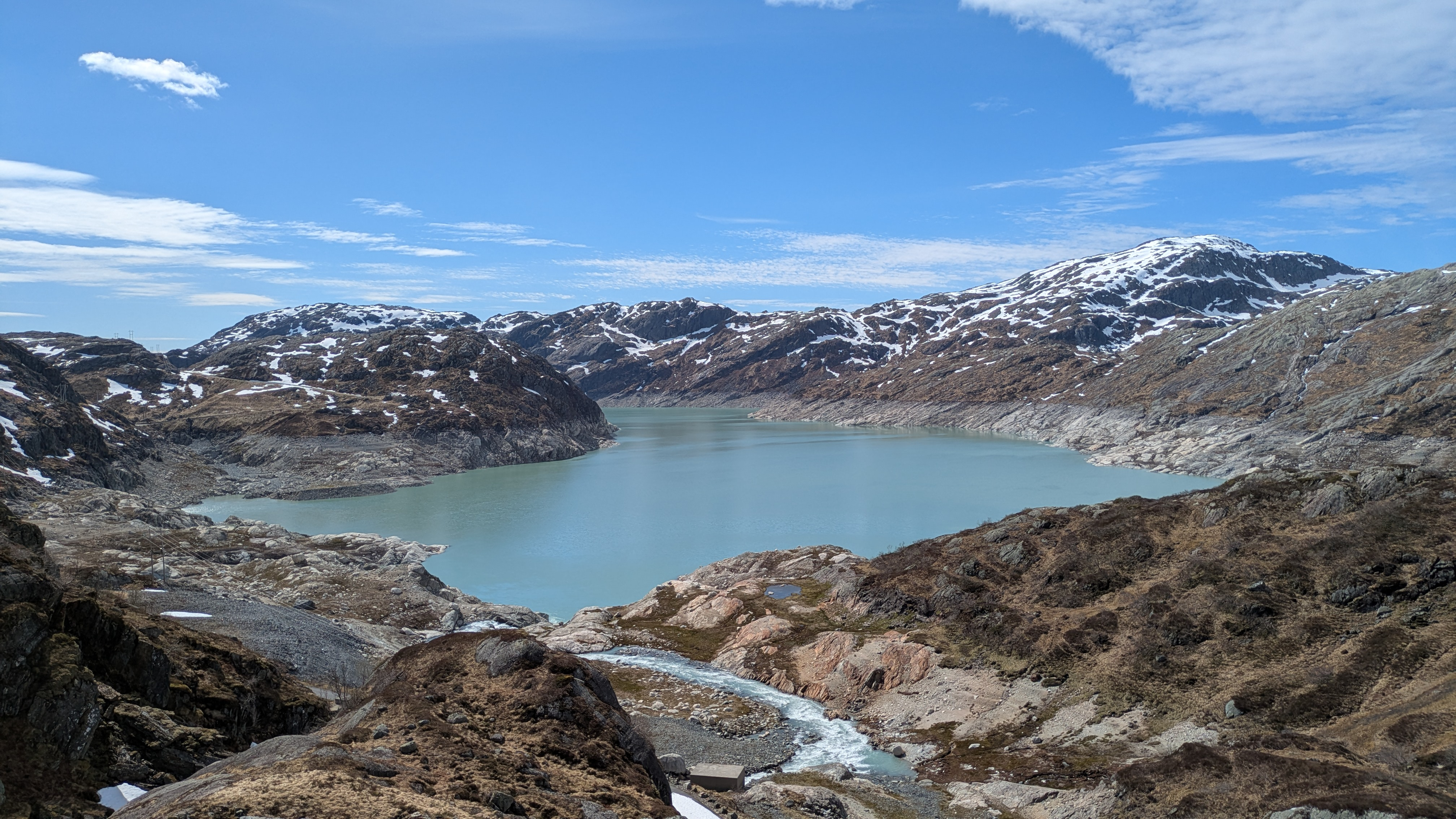
- Interactive map of Blådalsvatnet
- Location: Kvinnherad Municipality, Vestland
- Coordinates: 59.9183°N 6.16373°E
- Basin countries: Norway
- Max. length: 4 kilometres (2.5 mi)
- Max. width: 1.2 kilometres (0.75 mi)
- Surface area: 2.89 km^{2} (1.12 sq mi)
- Shore length^{1}: 13.38 kilometres (8.31 mi)
- Surface elevation: 711 metres (2,333 ft)
- References: NVE
- ^{1} Shore length is not a well-defined measure.

Blådalsvatnet is a glacial lake in Kvinnherad Municipality in Vestland county, Norway. The 2.89-square-kilometre (1.12 sq mi) lake lies just outside the Folgefonna National Park, about 10 kilometres (6.2 mi) northeast of the village of Indre Matre. The lake is formed by the glacial runoff from the large Folgefonna glacier located just north of the lake. The lake is part of the water system used to power the Blåfalli kraftverk hydroelectric power station.

== See also ==
- List of lakes in Norway
