= Ænes Church =

Church in Vestland, Norway

- Ænes kyrkje
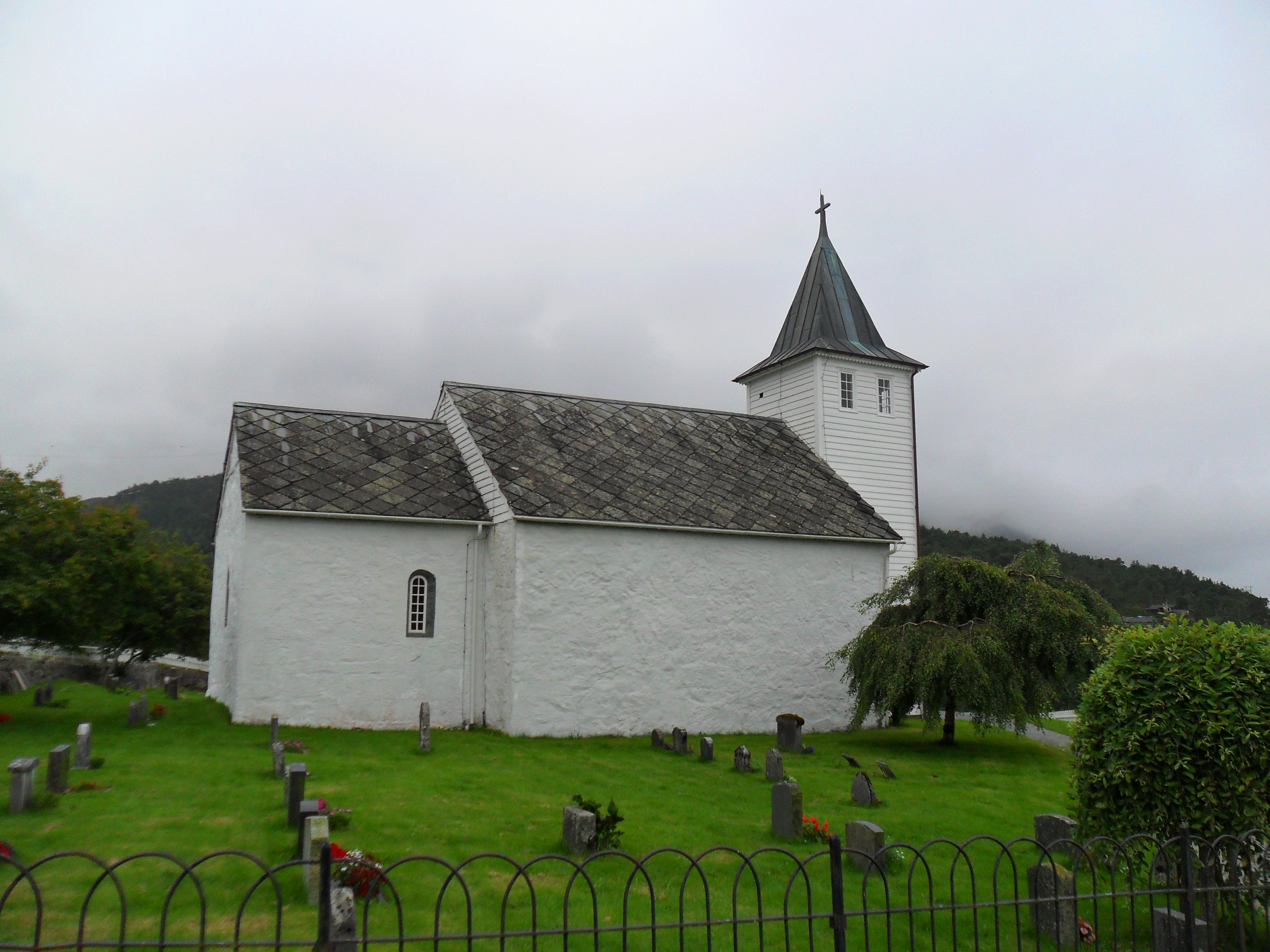
- View of the church
- Ænes Church
- 60°05′26″N 6°06′48″E
- Location: Kvinnherad Municipality, Vestland
- Country: Norway
- Denomination: Church of Norway
- Previous denomination: Catholic Church
- Churchmanship: Evangelical Lutheran

History
- Status: Parish church
- Founded: c. 1200
- Consecrated: c. 1200

Architecture
- Functional status: Active
- Architectural type: Long church
- Completed: c. 1200 (826 years ago)

Specifications
- Capacity: 120
- Materials: Stone

Administration
- Diocese: Bjørgvin bispedømme
- Deanery: Sunnhordland prosti
- Parish: Ænes
- Norwegian Cultural Heritage Site
- Type: Church
- Status: Automatically protected
- ID: 85897

Ænes Church (Norwegian: Ænes kyrkje) is a parish church of the Church of Norway in Kvinnherad Municipality in Vestland county, Norway. It is located in the village of Ænes. It is the church for the Ænes parish which is part of the Sunnhordland prosti (deanery) in the Diocese of Bjørgvin. The white, stone church was built in a long church design around the year 1200 using plans drawn up by an unknown architect. The church seats about 120 people.

== History ==
The church at Ænes was first built in the late 12th century, around the year 1200. The stone church was constructed with a short, almost square nave measuring about 7.7 by 8.2 metres (25 ft × 27 ft) and a narrower, almost square choir measuring about 4.7 by 5.3 metres (15 ft × 17 ft). The church has Romanesque features which suggest that the building was built towards the end of the 12th century. The church is built of natural stone, covered with plaster. The walls are about 1.4 metres (4 ft 7 in) thick. The Barony Rosendal was established in 1678 and the church was given as part of the barony. In 1869, the church underwent a major renovation. The small, old church porch was torn down and replaced with a much larger wooden church porch and bell tower on the west end of the stone church. Also during this project the ceilings inside the church were replaced. The church was owned by the Barony from 1678 until 1901 when it was sold to the parish. After the parish gained ownership of the church, it was renovated and it received new floors. The church was again renovated in the 1950s, led by the architect Kristian Bjerknes.

== Media gallery ==
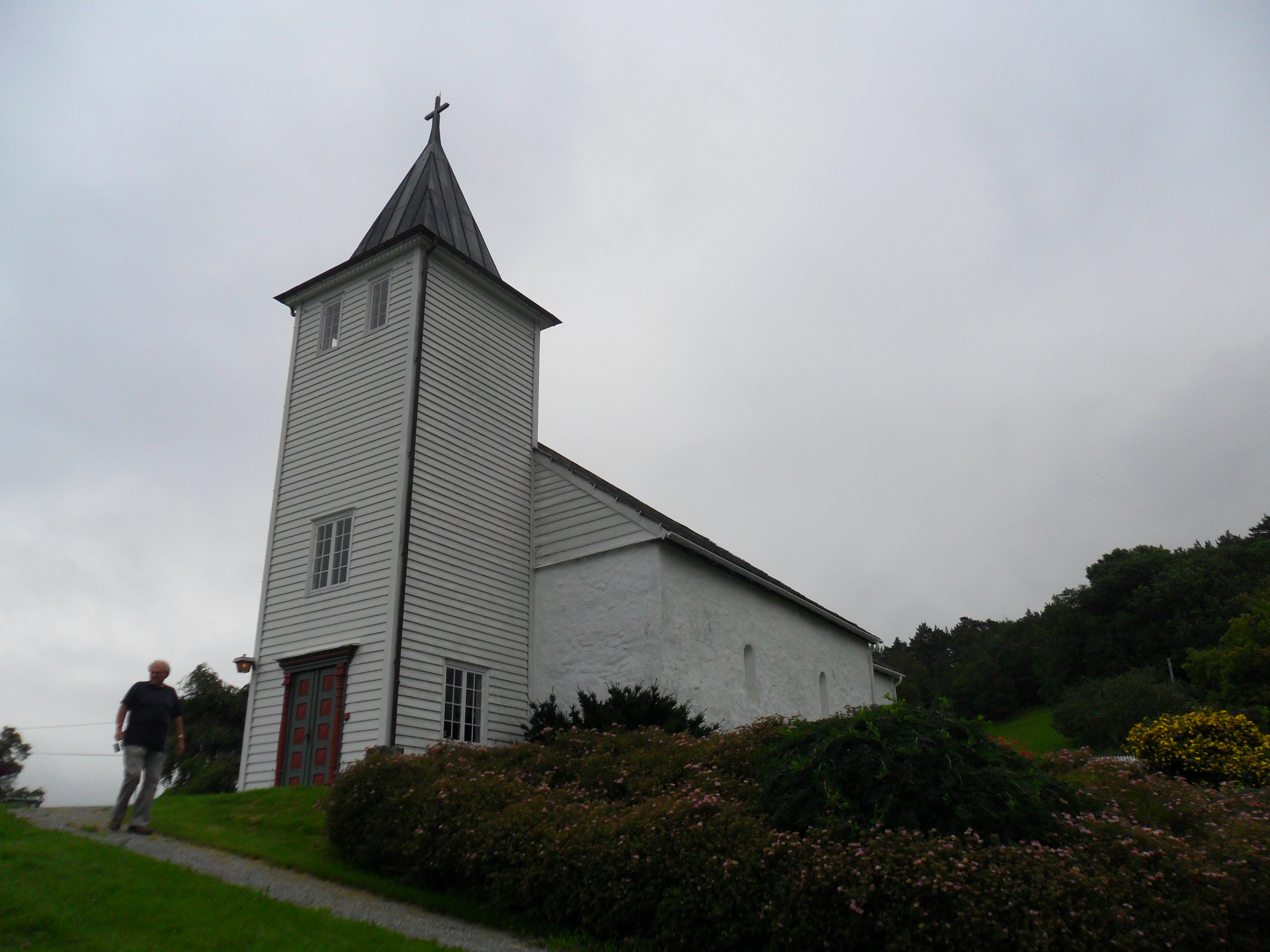
Front of church

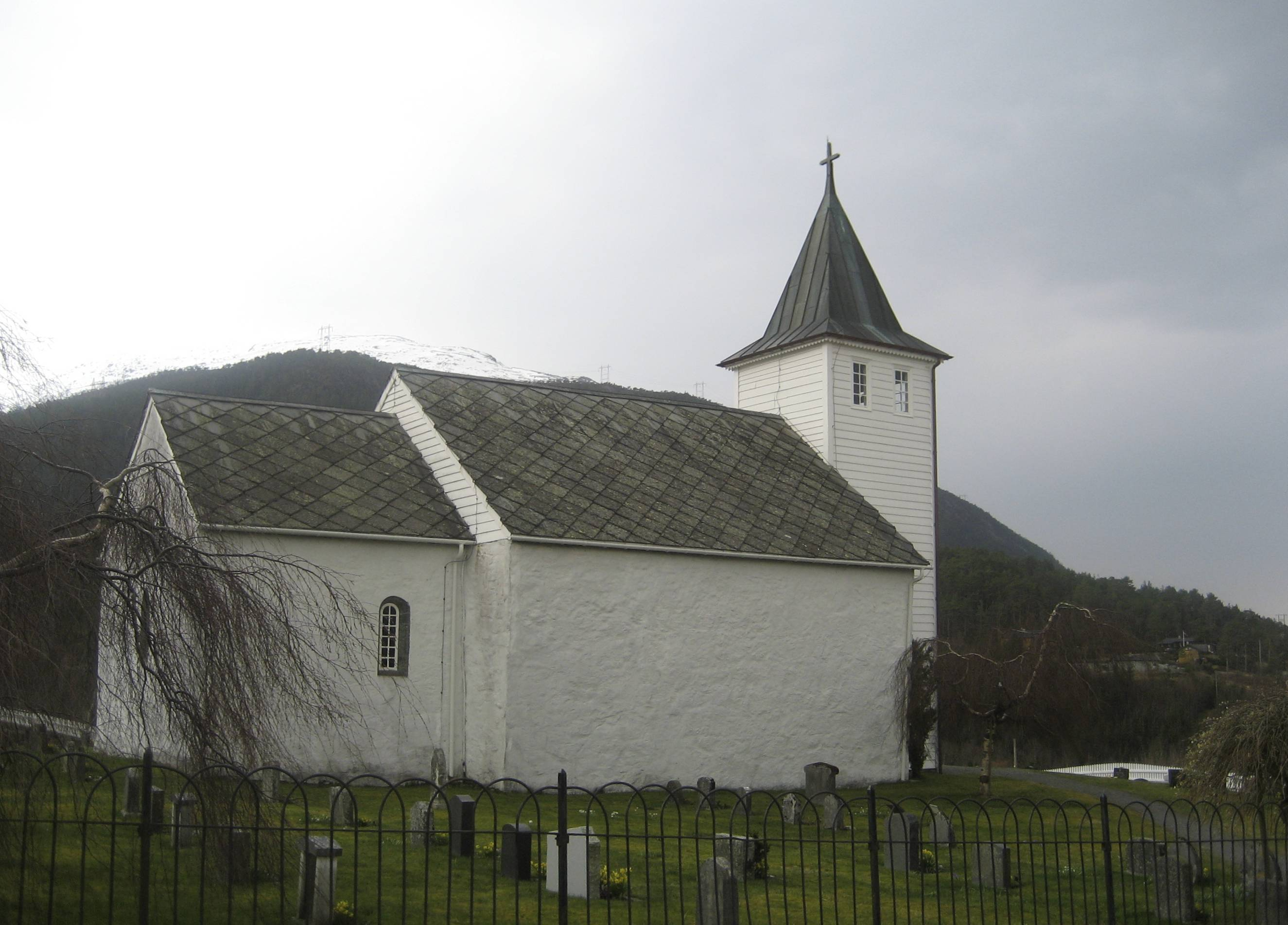
Side of church

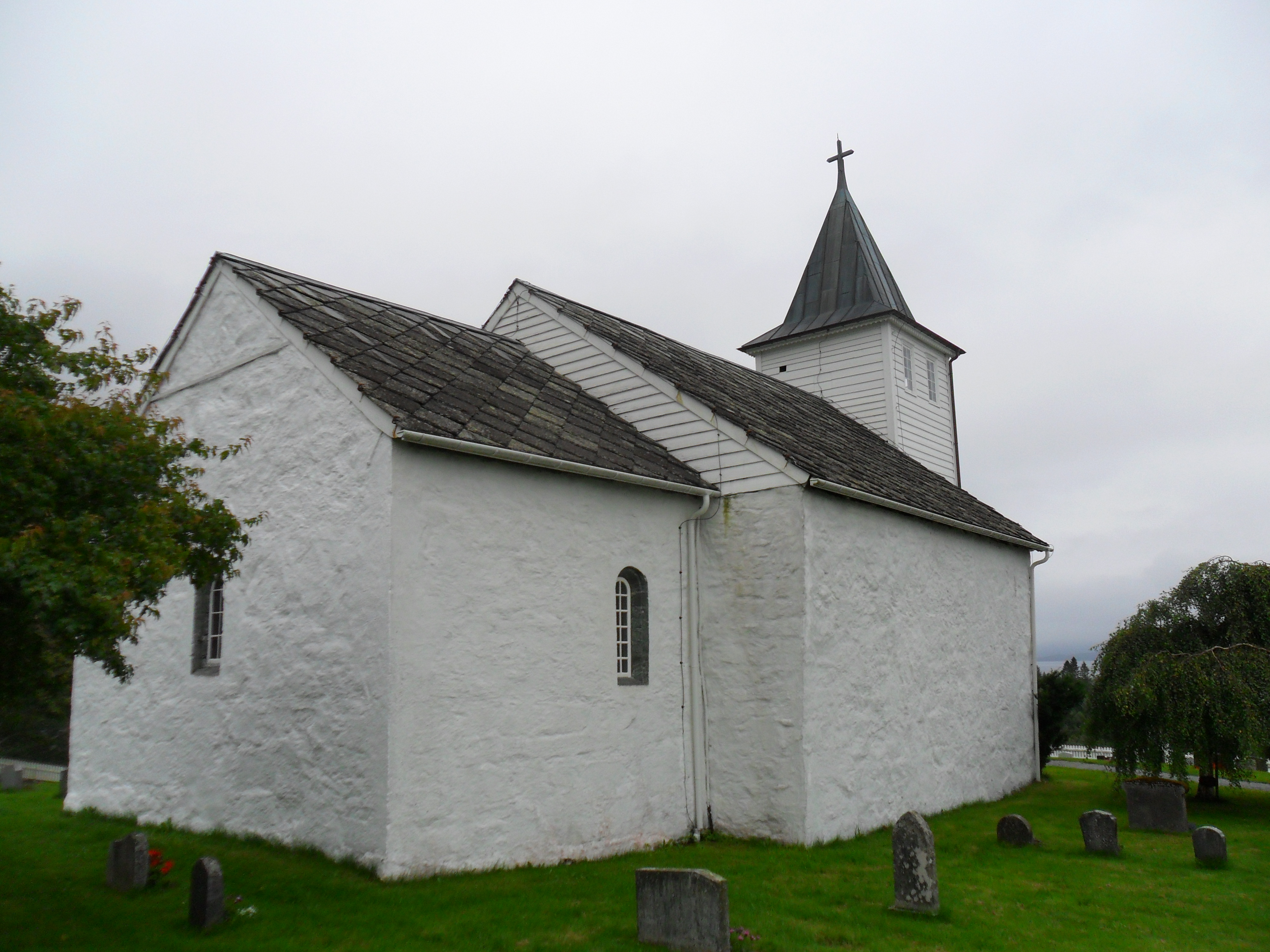
Rear part of church

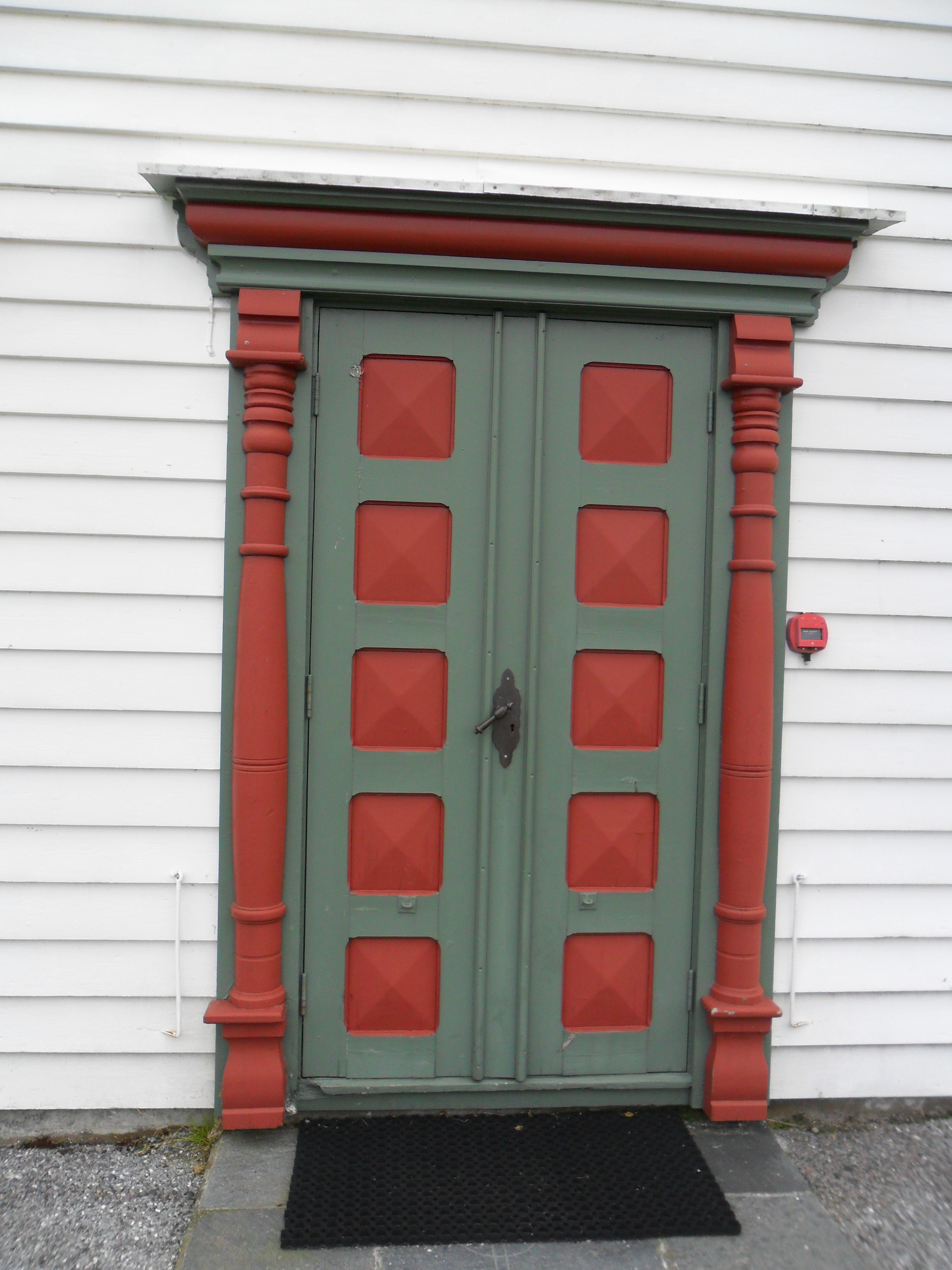
Front entrance

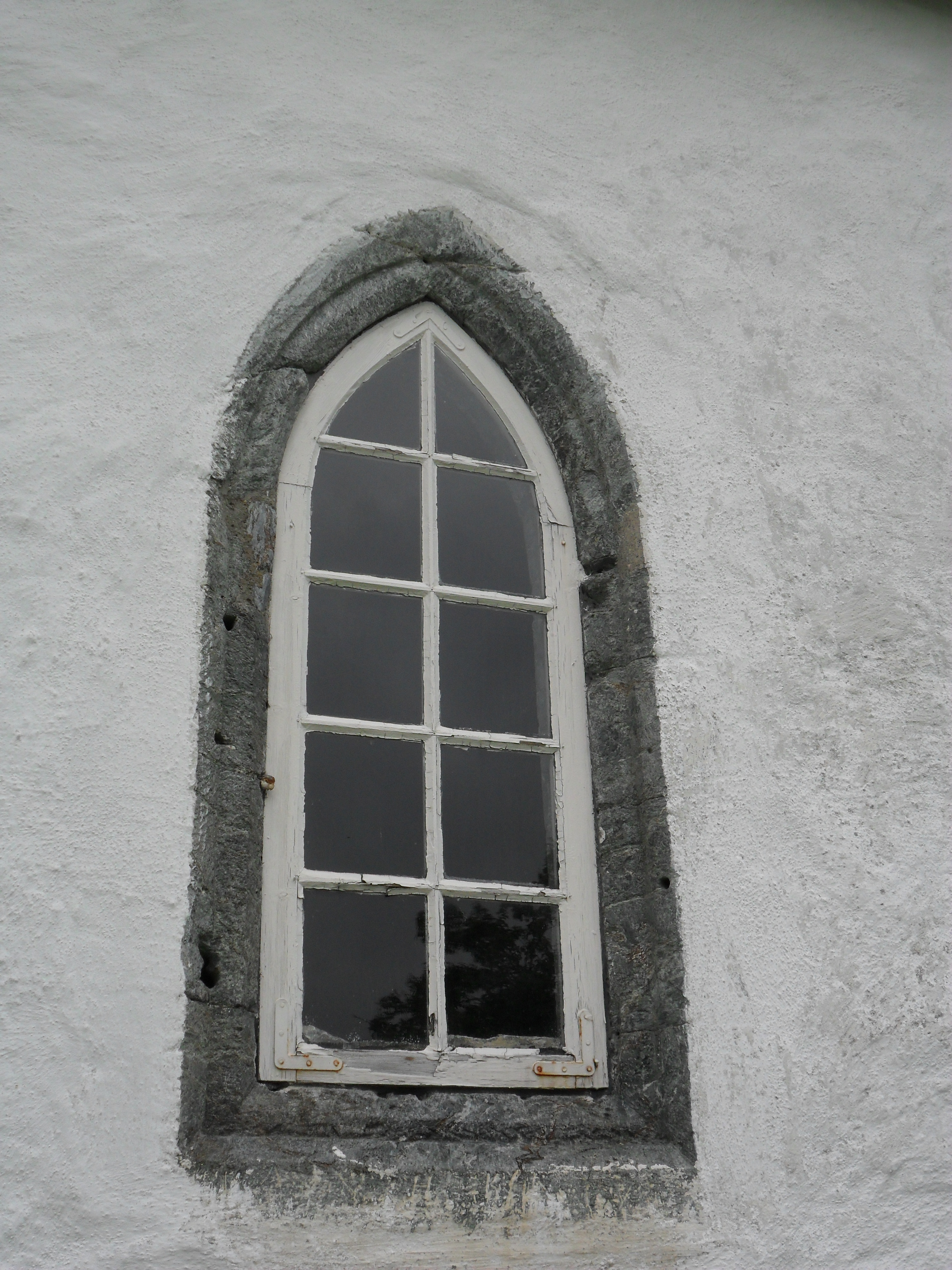
Side window

== See also ==
- List of churches in Bjørgvin
