= Åkra Church (Vestland) =

Church in Vestland, Norway

- Åkra kyrkje
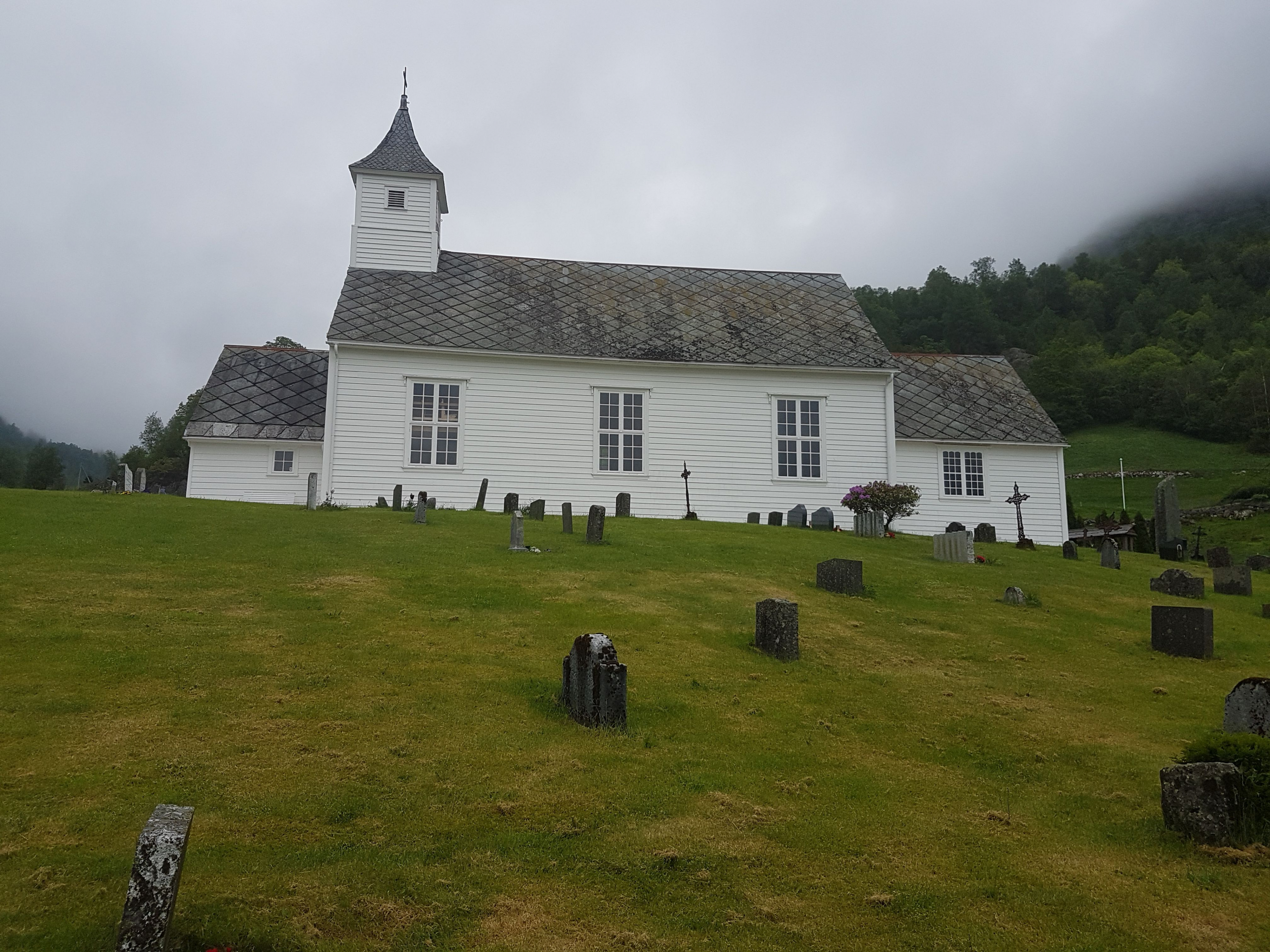
- View of the church
- Åkra Church
- 59°47′24″N 6°06′05″E
- Location: Kvinnherad Municipality, Vestland
- Country: Norway
- Denomination: Church of Norway
- Previous denomination: Catholic Church
- Churchmanship: Evangelical Lutheran

History
- Status: Parish church
- Founded: 13th century
- Consecrated: 1735

Architecture
- Functional status: Active
- Architectural type: Long church
- Completed: 1735 (291 years ago)

Specifications
- Capacity: 225
- Materials: Wood

Administration
- Diocese: Bjørgvin bispedømme
- Deanery: Sunnhordland prosti
- Parish: Åkra
- Norwegian Cultural Heritage Site
- Type: Church
- Status: Automatically protected
- ID: 85954

Åkra Church (Norwegian: Åkra kyrkje) is a parish church of the Church of Norway in Kvinnherad Municipality in Vestland county, Norway. It is located in the village of Åkra. It is the church for the Åkra parish which is part of the Sunnhordland prosti (deanery) in the Diocese of Bjørgvin. The white, wooden church was built in a long church design in 1735 using plans drawn up by an unknown architect. The church seats about 225 people.

== History ==
The church in Åkra has been around since the Middle Ages. The earliest existing historical records of the church date back to the year 1329, but the church was not new that year. The first church was a wooden stave church that was likely built during the 13th century. The church measured approximately 15 by 9 metres (49 ft × 30 ft) with a choir that measured 5 by 5.6 metres (16 ft × 18 ft). In 1735, the old church was torn down and a new timber-framed long church was built on the same site. In 1787, the church was described as having its interior walls decorated in rosemåling and murals depicting angels, King David, the creation story, the Fall, as well as many characters from the Bible. The church was heavily remodeled from 1871 to 1873 and during that all of the interior artwork was removed. The nave was taken down and rebuilt, enlarging and extending it further to the west. In 1919, the parish desired to tear down the old church a build a new one, but the Norwegian Directorate for Cultural Heritage objected and after many years of back and forth, the church was renovated in 1959.

== See also ==
- List of churches in Bjørgvin
