= Synnøve Solbakken (politician) =

Norwegian politician

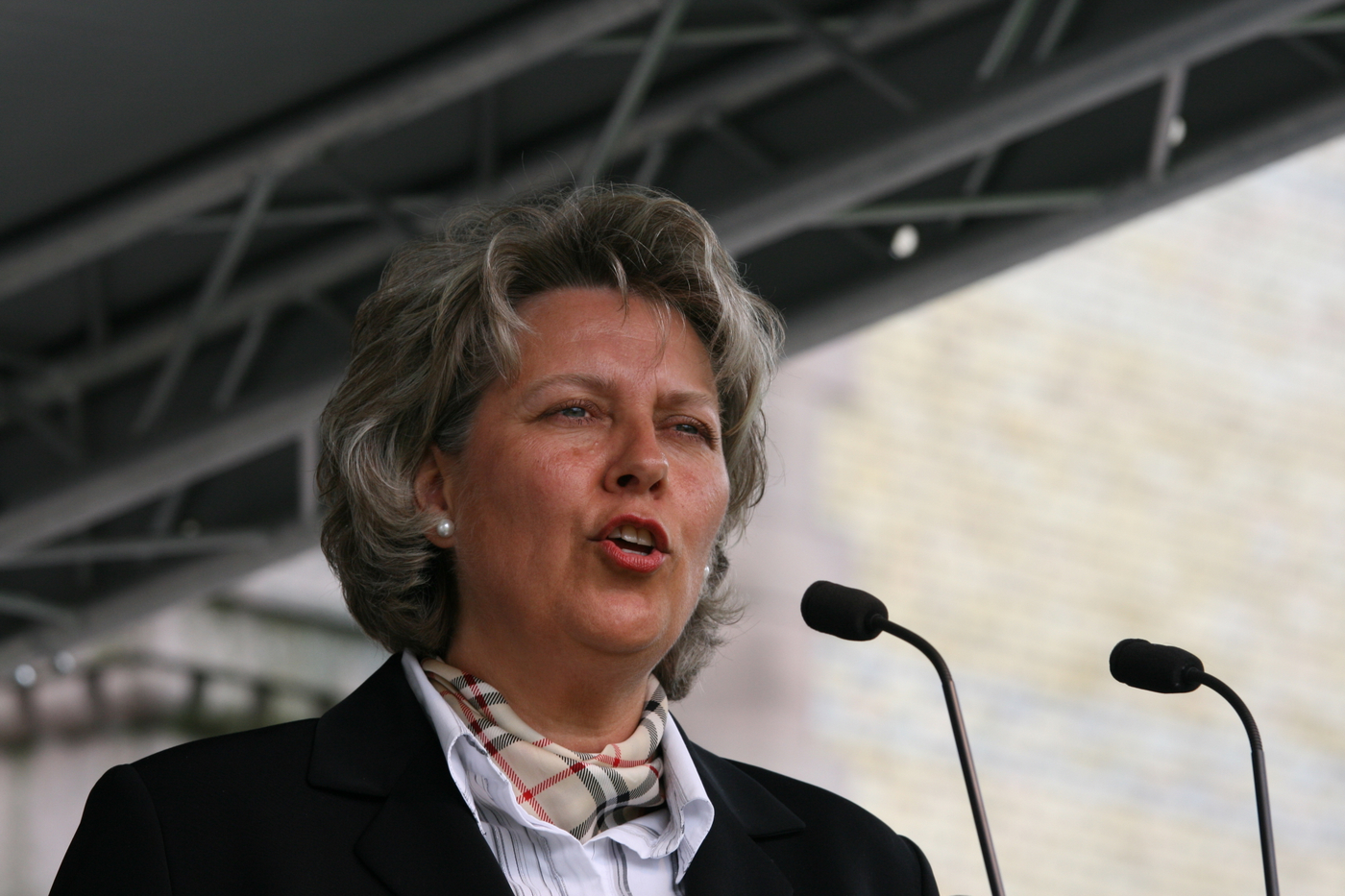

Mayor of Kvinnherad
- In office 2007–2015
- Preceded by: Bjarne Berge
- Succeeded by: Peder Sjo Slettebø

Personal details
- Born: Synnøve Solbakken; 11 May 1957 (age 68) Norway
- Party: Labour Party

Synnøve Solbakken (born 11 May 1957) is a Norwegian politician for the Labour Party.

She served as a deputy representative to the Parliament of Norway from Hordaland during the term 2005–2009. She also served as mayor of Kvinnherad Municipality from 2007 to 2015.
