= Hans Inge Myrvold =

Norwegian politician

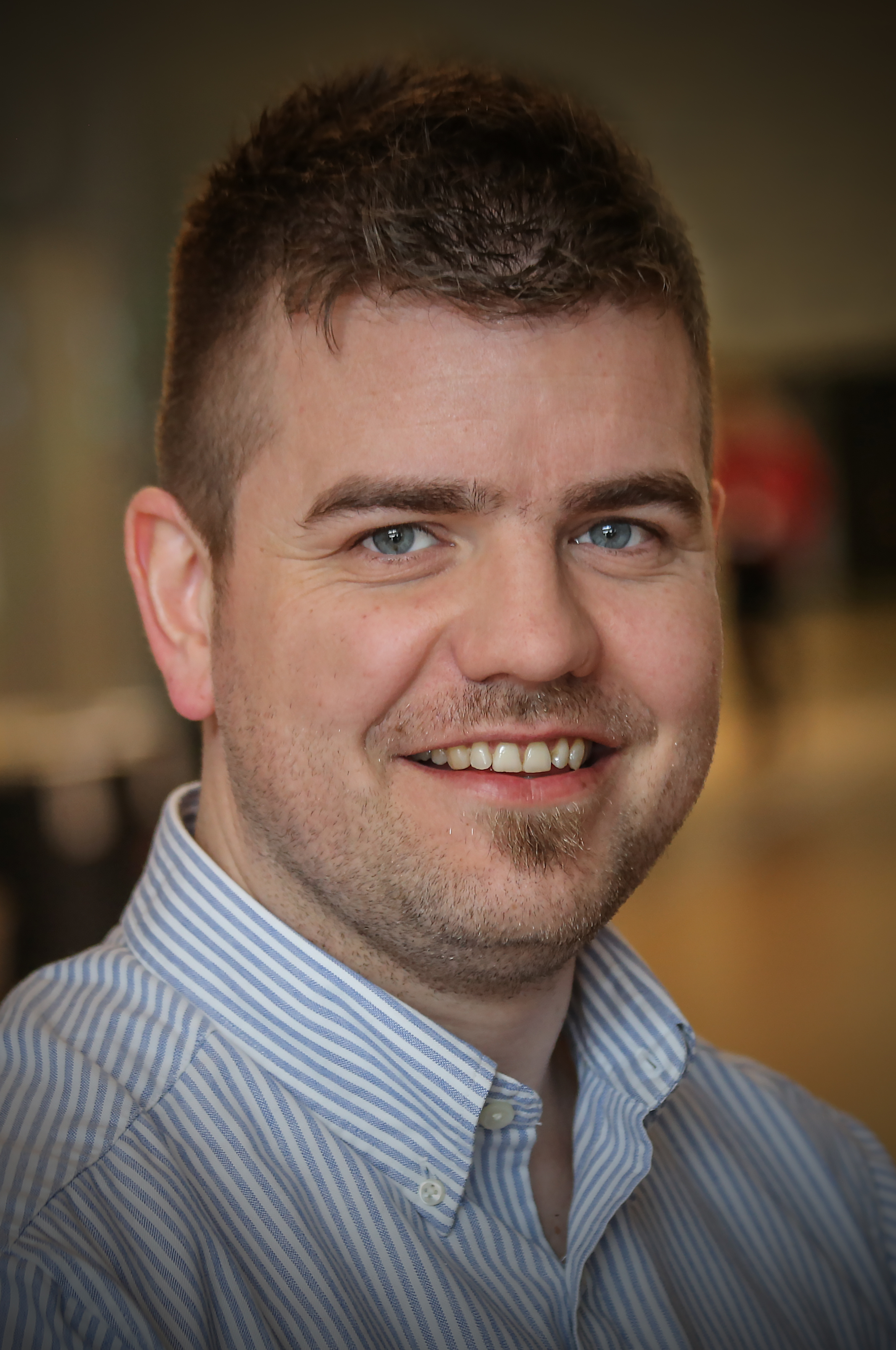
Hans Inge Myrvold på Senterpartiets landsmøte, Trondheim 2017

Hans Inge Myrvold (born 25 January 1985) is a Norwegian politician for the Centre Party.

He became a member of the municipal council of Kvinnherad Municipality in 2011, deputy mayor in 2015 and mayor in 2019. He served as a deputy representative to the Parliament of Norway from Hordaland during the terms 2017–2021 and 2021–2025. He met regularly in place of Kjersti Toppe from 2021, and took a seat in the Standing Committee on Health and Care Services.
