= Mauranger Hydroelectric Power Station =

Hydroelectric power station in Kvinnherad, Vestland, Norway

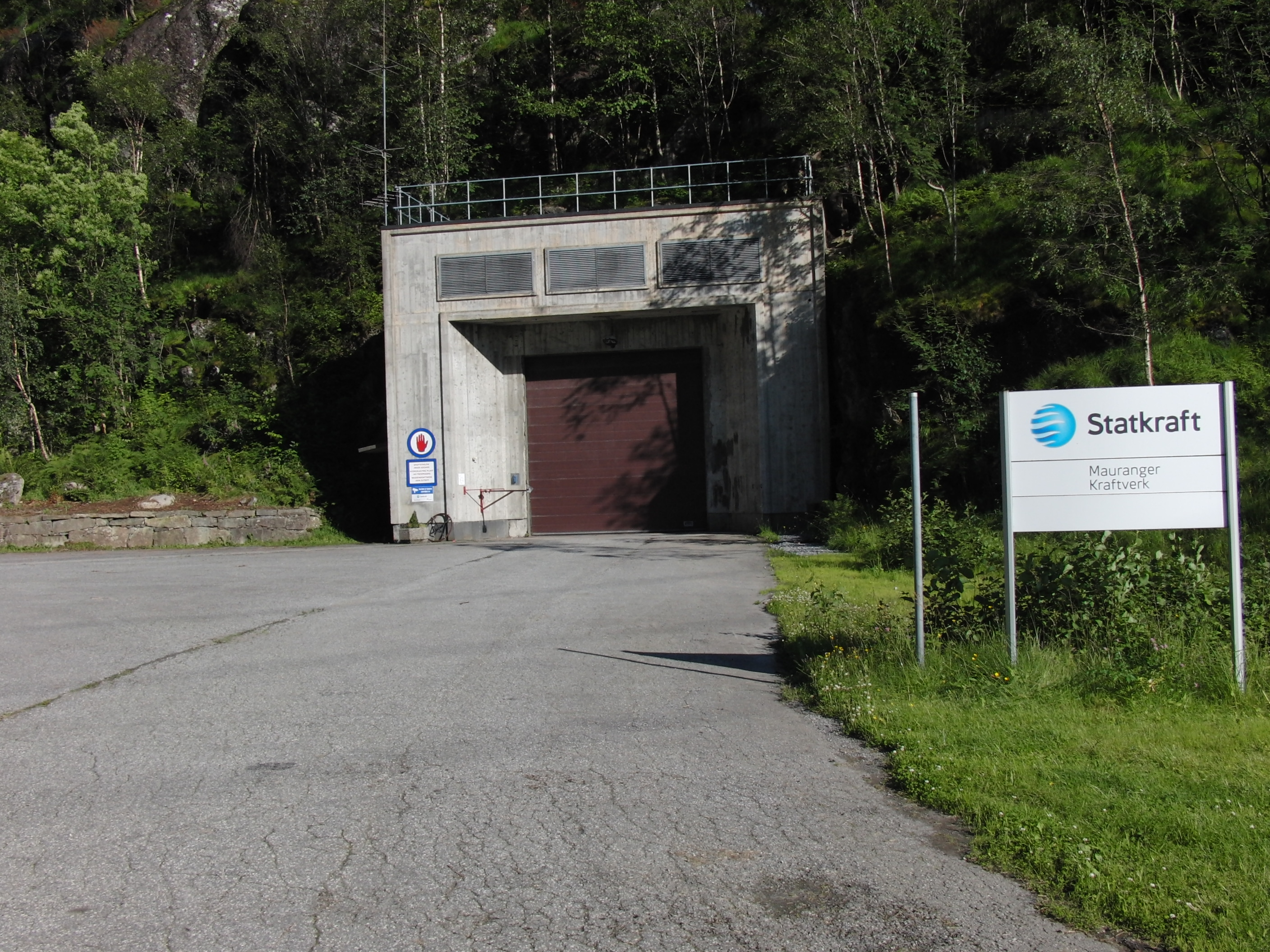
- Official name: Mauranger kraftverk
- Country: Norway
- Location: Kvinnherad Municipality
- Coordinates: 60°7′57.26″N 6°19′52.4″E
- Status: Operational
- Commission date: 1974
- Owners: Skagerak Kraft; Statkraft Energi
- Operator: Statkraft Energi

Tidal power station
- Tidal range: 825 m (2,707 ft); 830 m (2,720 ft)

Power generation
- Units planned: 2 × 125 MW
- Nameplate capacity: 250 MW
- Capacity factor: 54.5%
- Annual net output: 1,192 GW·h

The Mauranger Power Station is a hydroelectric power station located in Kvinnherad Municipality, Vestland county, Norway. It operates at an installed capacity of 250 megawatts (340,000 hp), with an average annual production of about 1,192 gigawatt-hours (4,290 TJ).
