= Jens Tvedt =

Norwegian writer (1857–1935)

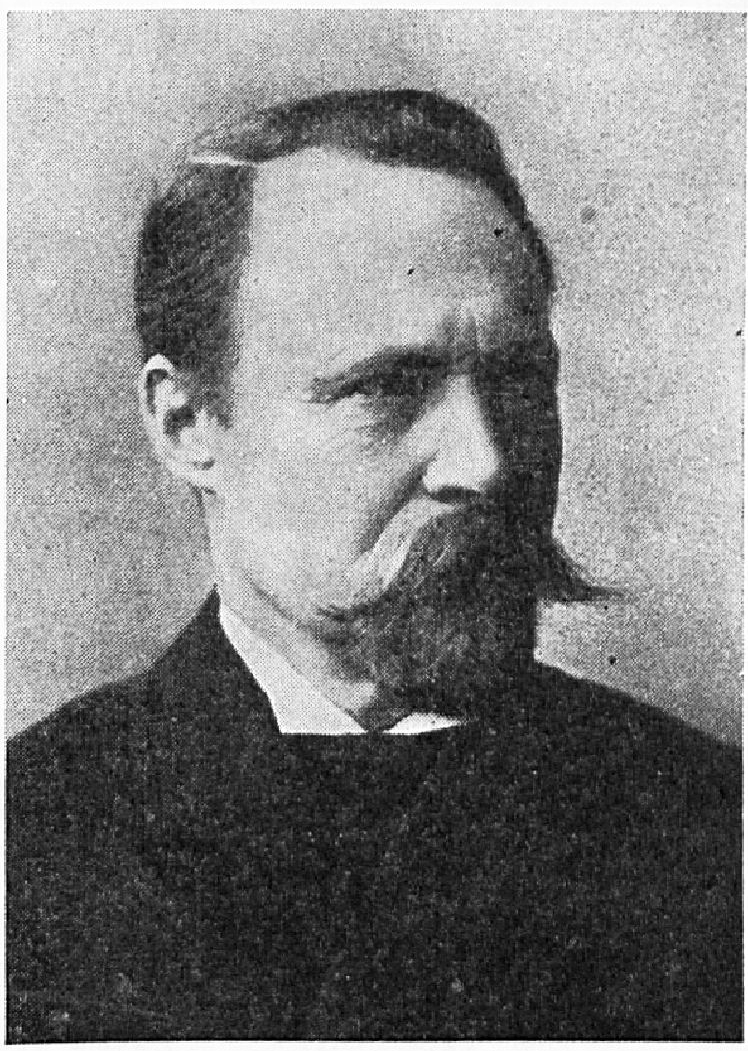
Jens Tvedt

Jens Tvedt (14 June 1857 – 3 September 1935) was a Norwegian novelist and writer of short stories. He was born in Quindherred Municipality. He made his literary debut in 1885 with the short story collection Inn i Fjordane. In his stories he often depicts everyday life of farmers from Western Norway. A bust of Tvedt, sculptured by Ståle Kyllingstad, was unveiled in Stavanger in 1932. He was biographized by Arne Espeland in 1959.

== Selected works ==
- Inn i Fjordane. 1885.
- Kjærleik. 1887.
- Vanheppa. 1891.
- Brita-Per. 1895.
- Madli und' Apalen. 1900.
