= Holmedal Church (Kvinnherad) =

Church in Vestland, Norway

- Holmedal kyrkje
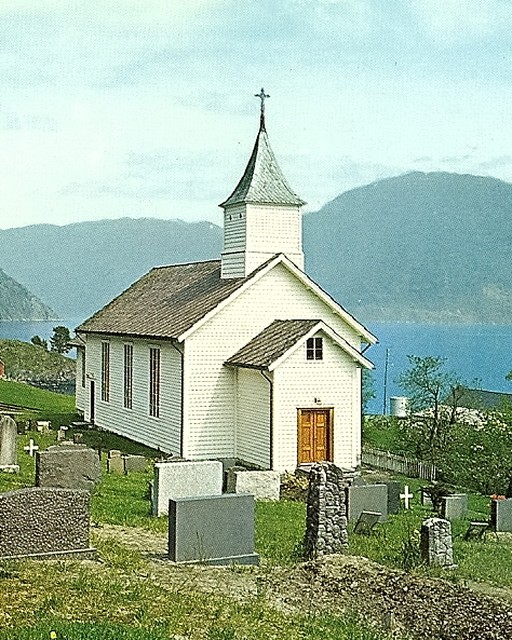
- View of the church
- Holmedal Church
- 59°47′01″N 5°54′10″E
- Location: Kvinnherad Municipality, Vestland
- Country: Norway
- Denomination: Church of Norway
- Previous denomination: Catholic Church
- Churchmanship: Evangelical Lutheran

History
- Status: Parish church
- Founded: 13th century
- Consecrated: 1882

Architecture
- Functional status: Active
- Architect: F. Øvrevik
- Architectural type: Long church
- Completed: 1882 (144 years ago)

Specifications
- Capacity: 215
- Materials: Wood

Administration
- Diocese: Bjørgvin bispedømme
- Deanery: Sunnhordland prosti
- Parish: Husnes og Holmedal
- Norwegian Cultural Heritage Site
- Type: Church
- Status: Listed
- ID: 84604

Holmedal Church (Norwegian: Holmedal kyrkje) is a parish church of the Church of Norway in Kvinnherad Municipality in Vestland county, Norway. It is located in the village of Utåker. It is one of the three churches for the Husnes og Holmedal parish which is part of the Sunnhordland prosti (deanery) in the Diocese of Bjørgvin. The white, wooden church was built in a long church design in 1882 using plans drawn up by the architect F. Øvrevik. The church seats about 215 people.

== History ==
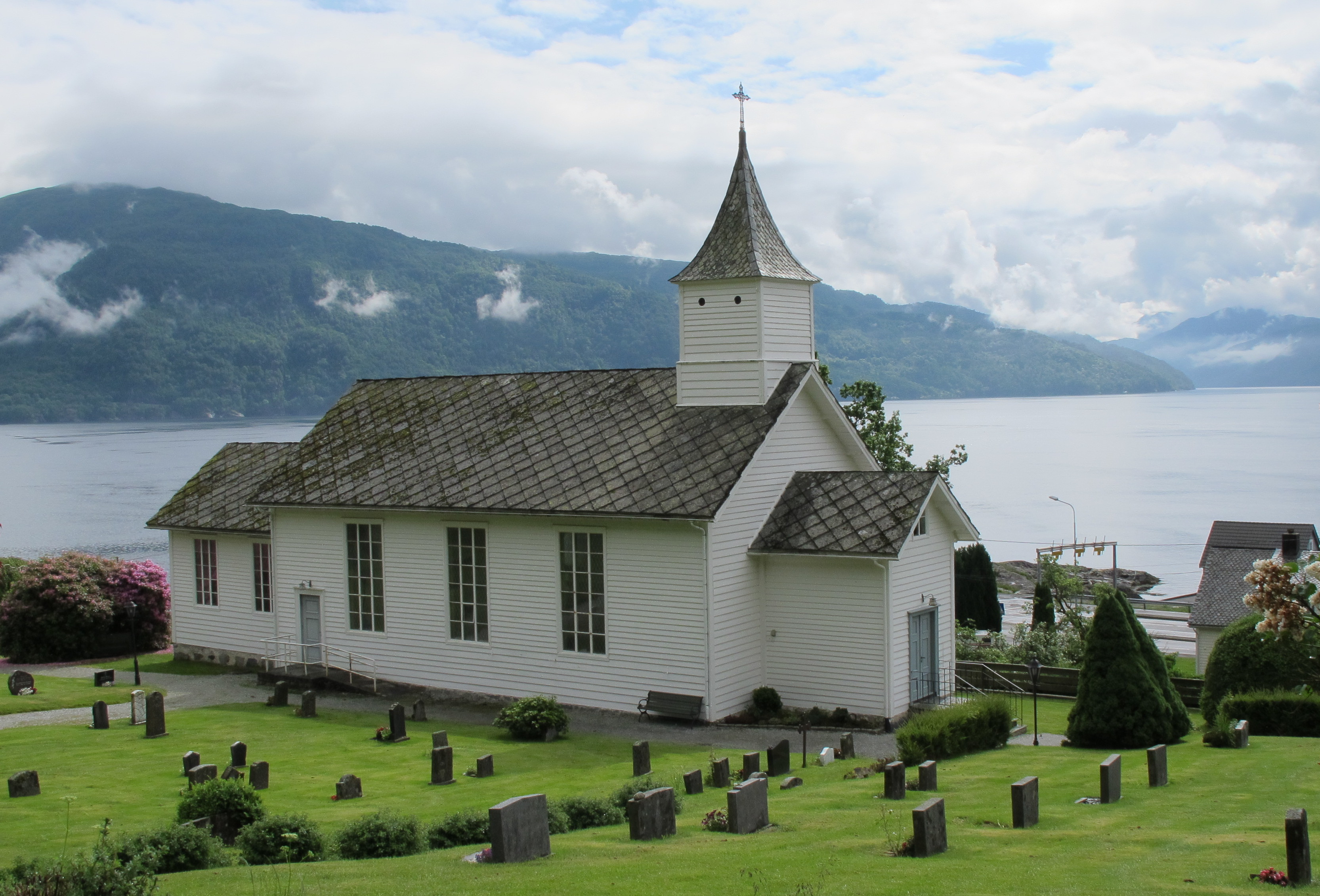
View of the church

The church has been around since the Middle Ages. The earliest existing historical records of the church date back to the year 1360, but it was not new at that time. The first church was a wooden stave church with a tower that was likely built during the 13th century. The first church was located at Holmedal, about 1.7 kilometres (1.1 mi) to the northeast of the present church site. In both the 1600s and 1700s, major repairs were undertaken, including removing the tower. The nave measured approximately 13.8 by 7.5 metres (45 ft × 25 ft) with a choir that measured about 5 by 4.4 metres (16 ft × 14 ft). In 1724, the church was purchased from the Crown by Henrik H. Formann, the manager of the Lyse Abbey. The church was sold along with hundreds of other churches during the Norwegian church sale to raise money to pay down the debt from the Great Northern War.

By the early 1800s, the old church was in poor shape, so it was decided to tear down the old church and build a new one on the same site. In 1814, the old church was torn down and the owner at that time, Haktor Amundsen Tveit, paid to build a new church on the same site. The new church was a small rectangular church without a separate choir, no tower, and no sacristy. The church was approximately 16 by 7 metres (52 ft × 23 ft). In 1866, the parish purchased the church back from private owners at a cost of 325 Norwegian speciedalers. After the church was constructed the local parish priest, P. Bøckmann complained that it "looks like a barn building and not like a church, it is a cramped house, has no chancel building, no tower, not even a marking that indicates it is God's house" (Norwegian: “ser ud som en Ladebygning og ikke som en Kirke, er et for trangt Hus, ingen Korbygning, intet Taarn, end ikke en Fløi paa Møningen tyder paa at det er Guds Hus”).

On 11 December 1880, a royal resolution was passed that approved the moving of the Holmedal Church from its historic location to one that was more centrally located in the parish, about 1.7 kilometres (1.1 mi) to the southwest in the village of Utåker. In 1882, the church was taken down, moved, and rebuilt using a new design by the local lensmann F. Øvrevik from Skånevik. The new church has a choir that is approximately 4.5 by 5.6 metres (15 ft × 18 ft) and the nave is about 8.1 by 15.5 metres (27 ft × 51 ft). The church was renovated for the 100th anniversary in 1982 under the direction of architect Magne Ivarsøy.

== See also ==
- List of churches in Bjørgvin
