= Ænes =

Village in Kvinnherad Municipality, Norway

- Village
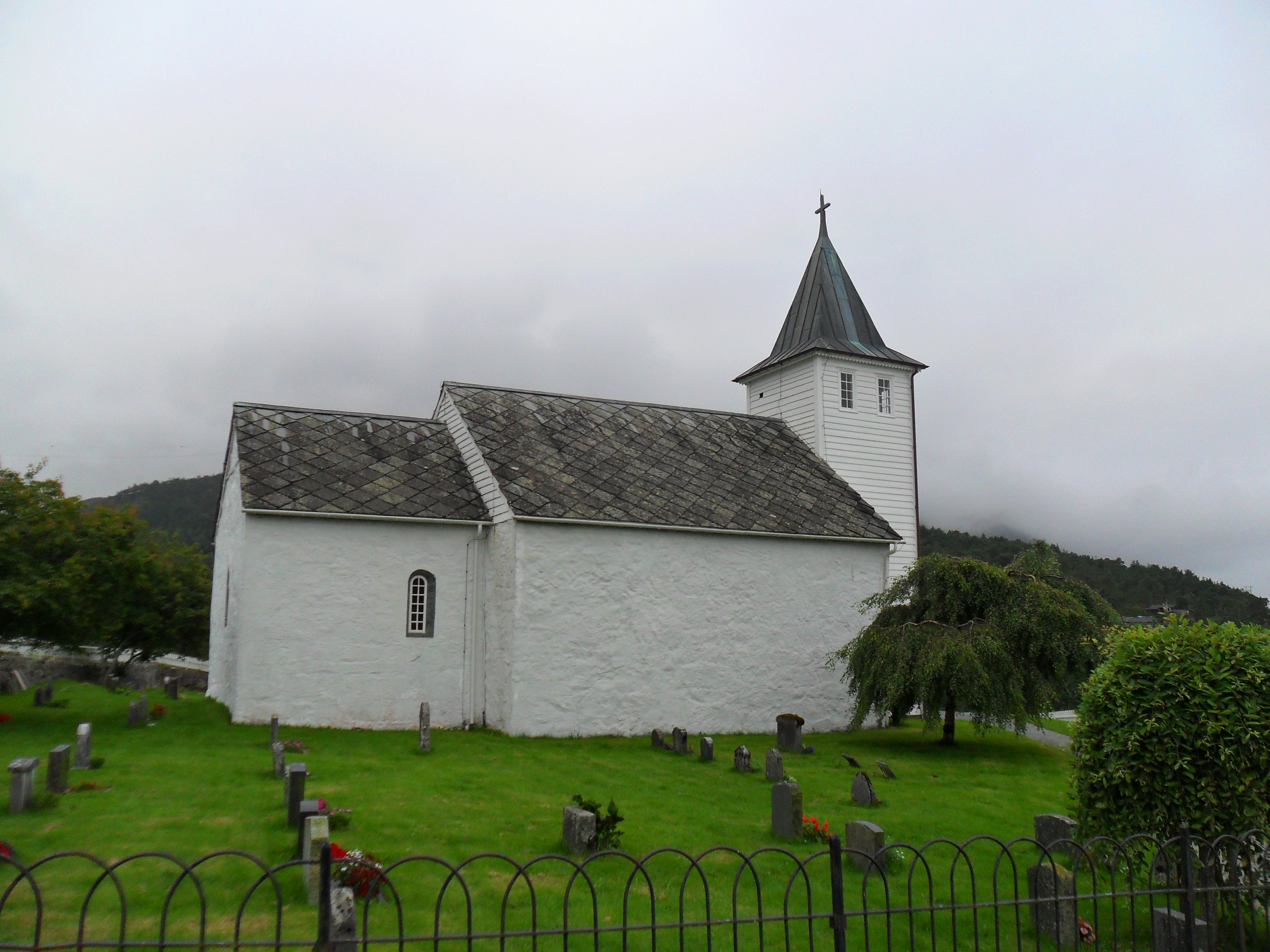
- View of the village church
- Interactive map of Ænes
- Coordinates: 60.09078°N 6.11445°E
- Country: Norway
- Region: Western Norway
- County: Vestland
- District: Sunnhordland
- Municipality: Kvinnherad Municipality
- Elevation: 45 m (148 ft)
- Time zone: UTC+01:00 (CET)
  - Summer (DST): UTC+02:00 (CEST)
- Post Code: 5475 Ænes

Ænes is a village in Kvinnherad Municipality in Vestland county, Norway. The village is located on the southeastern shore of the Hardangerfjorden at the mouth of the Maurangsfjorden. Ænes Church is located in the village. There has been a church located here since the Middle Ages.

The village sits at the northern end of the small Ænesdalen valley, through which the river Æneselva runs. The border for Folgefonna National Park lies at the southern end of the valley, just a few kilometers south of Ænes.
