= Kvinnherad Church =

Church in Vestland, Norway

- Kvinnherad kyrkje
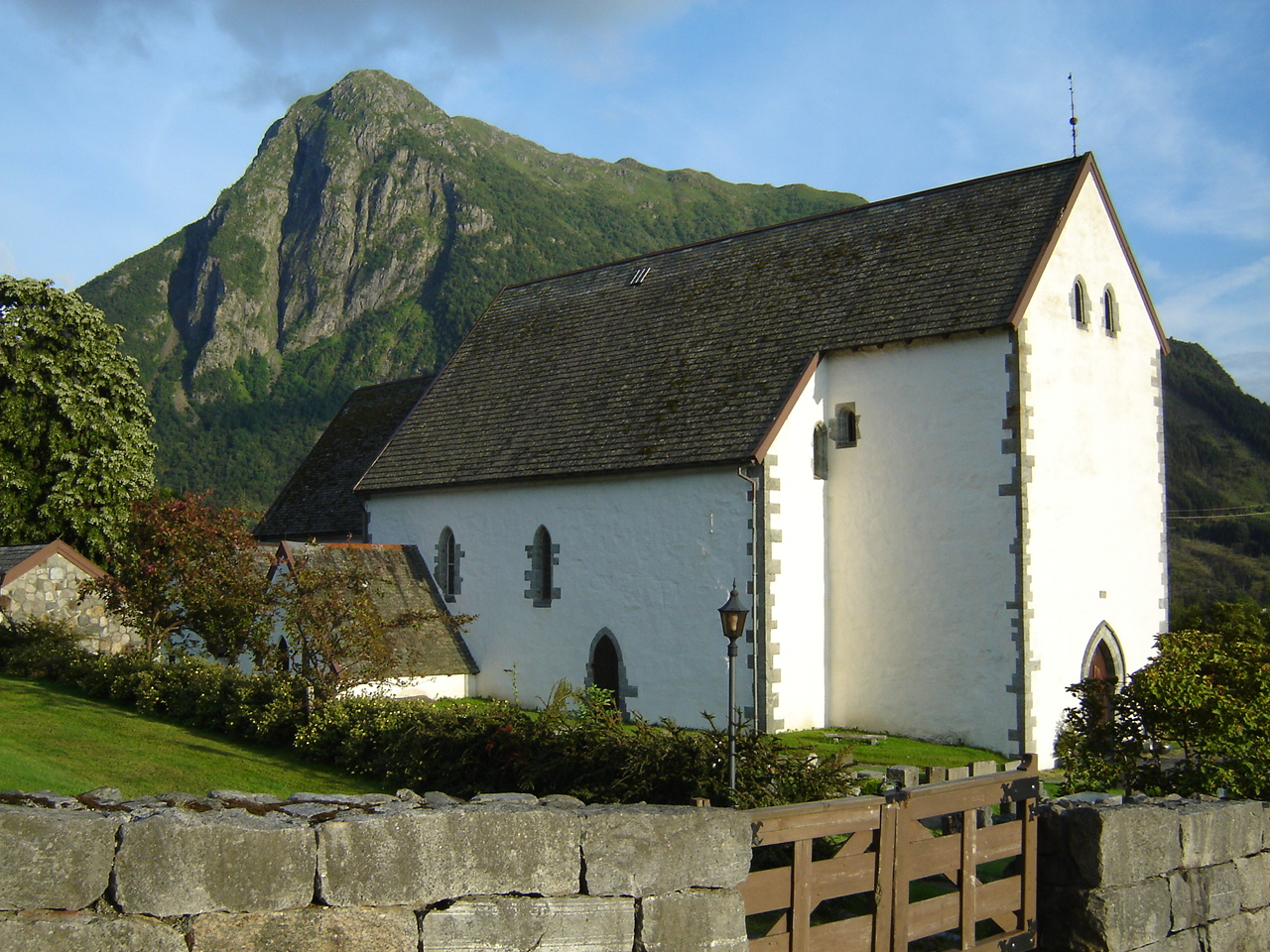
- View of the church
- Kvinnherad Church
- 59°59′23″N 6°00′24″E
- Location: Kvinnherad Municipality, Vestland
- Country: Norway
- Denomination: Church of Norway
- Previous denomination: Catholic Church
- Churchmanship: Evangelical Lutheran

History
- Status: Parish church
- Founded: 12th century
- Consecrated: c. 1275

Architecture
- Functional status: Active
- Architectural type: Long church
- Completed: c. 1275 (751 years ago)

Specifications
- Capacity: 380
- Materials: Stone

Administration
- Diocese: Bjørgvin bispedømme
- Deanery: Sunnhordland prosti
- Parish: Kvinnherad
- Norwegian Cultural Heritage Site
- Type: Church
- Status: Automatically protected
- ID: 84867

Kvinnherad Church (Norwegian: Kvinnherad kyrkje) is a parish church of the Church of Norway in Kvinnherad Municipality in Vestland county, Norway. It is located in the village of Rosendal. It is the church for the Rosendal parish which is part of the Sunnhordland prosti (deanery) in the Diocese of Bjørgvin. The white, stone church was built in a long church design in the mid-1200s using plans drawn up by an unknown architect. The church seats about 380 people.

== History ==
The earliest existing historical records of the church date back to the year 1306, but it was not new at that time. The first church at Kvinnherad, was possibly a wooden post church that was built in the 12th century. During the middle to late 13th century, the wooden church was torn down and a new stone church was built to replace it. In 1678, the church became part of the newly established Barony Rosendal, where many of the Rosenkrantz family are buried.

In 1814, this church served as an election church (Norwegian: valgkirke). Together with more than 300 other parish churches across Norway, it was a polling station for elections to the 1814 Norwegian Constituent Assembly which wrote the Constitution of Norway. This was Norway's first national elections. Each church parish was a constituency that elected people called "electors" who later met together in each county to elect the representatives for the assembly that was to meet at Eidsvoll Manor later that year.

In 1910, the church was sold to the municipality. The building has been renovated and refurbished many times over the centuries, the most recent times were in 1913-1914 and in 1955.

== Media gallery ==
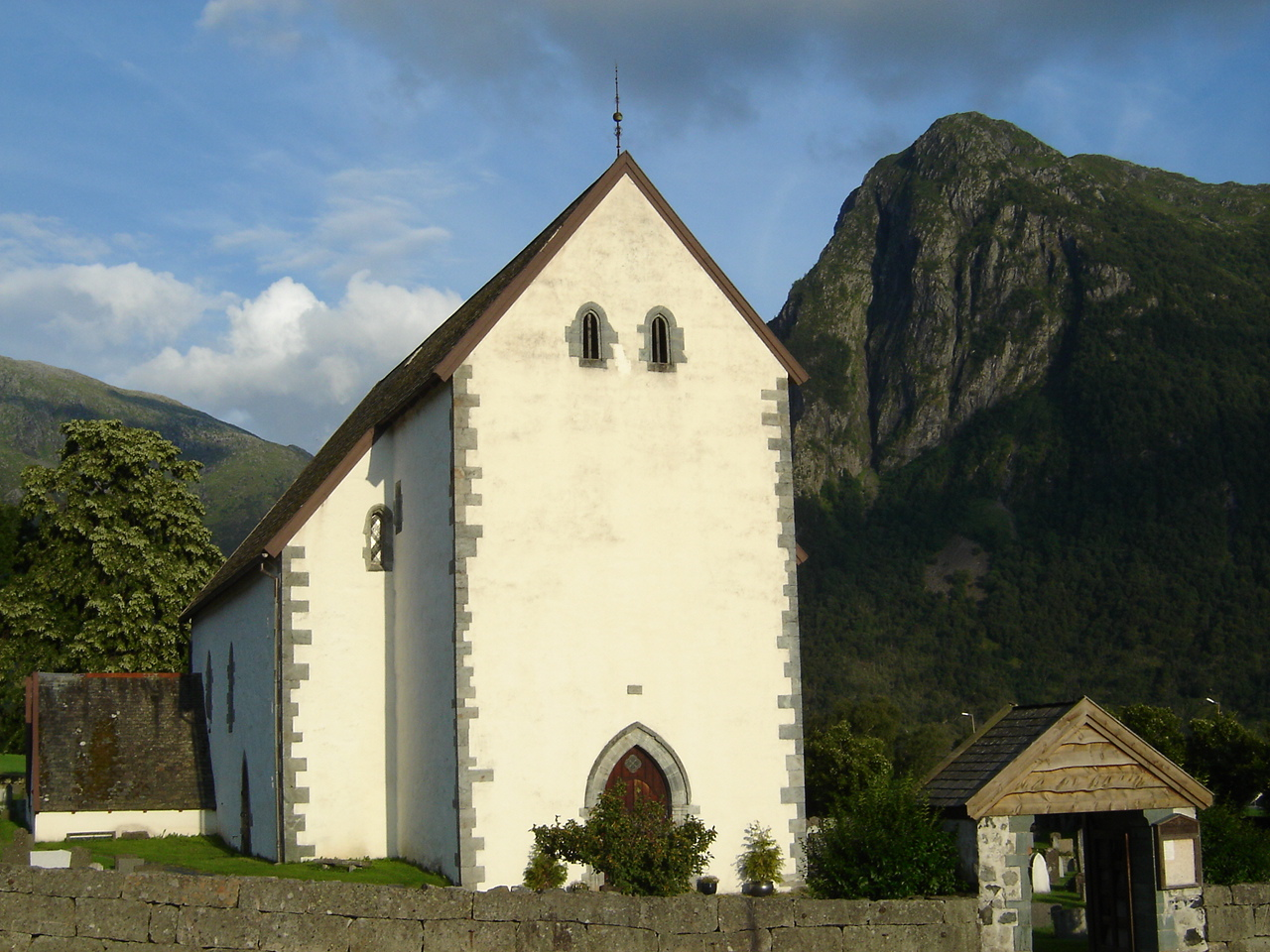
Front of church

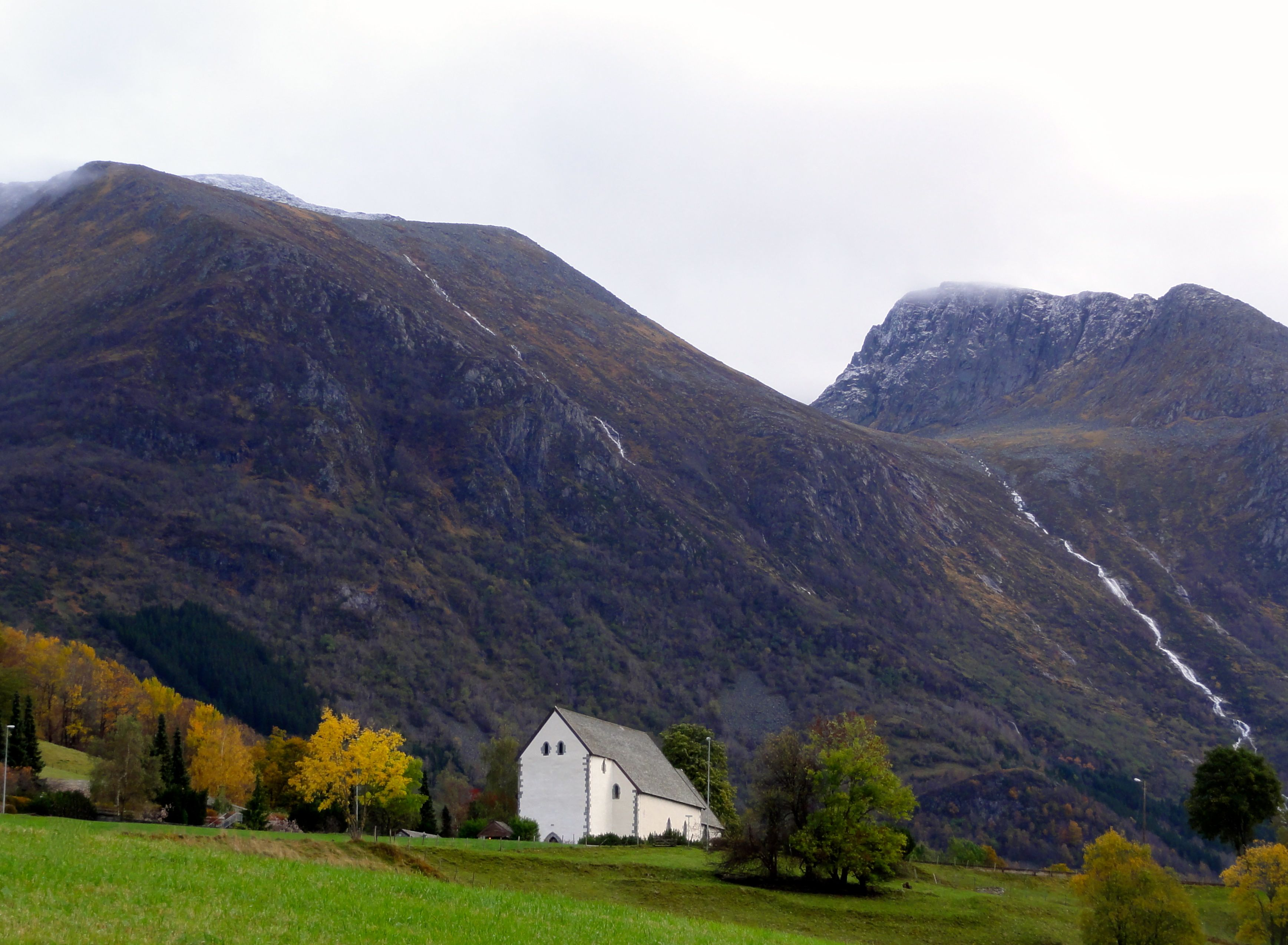
From a distance

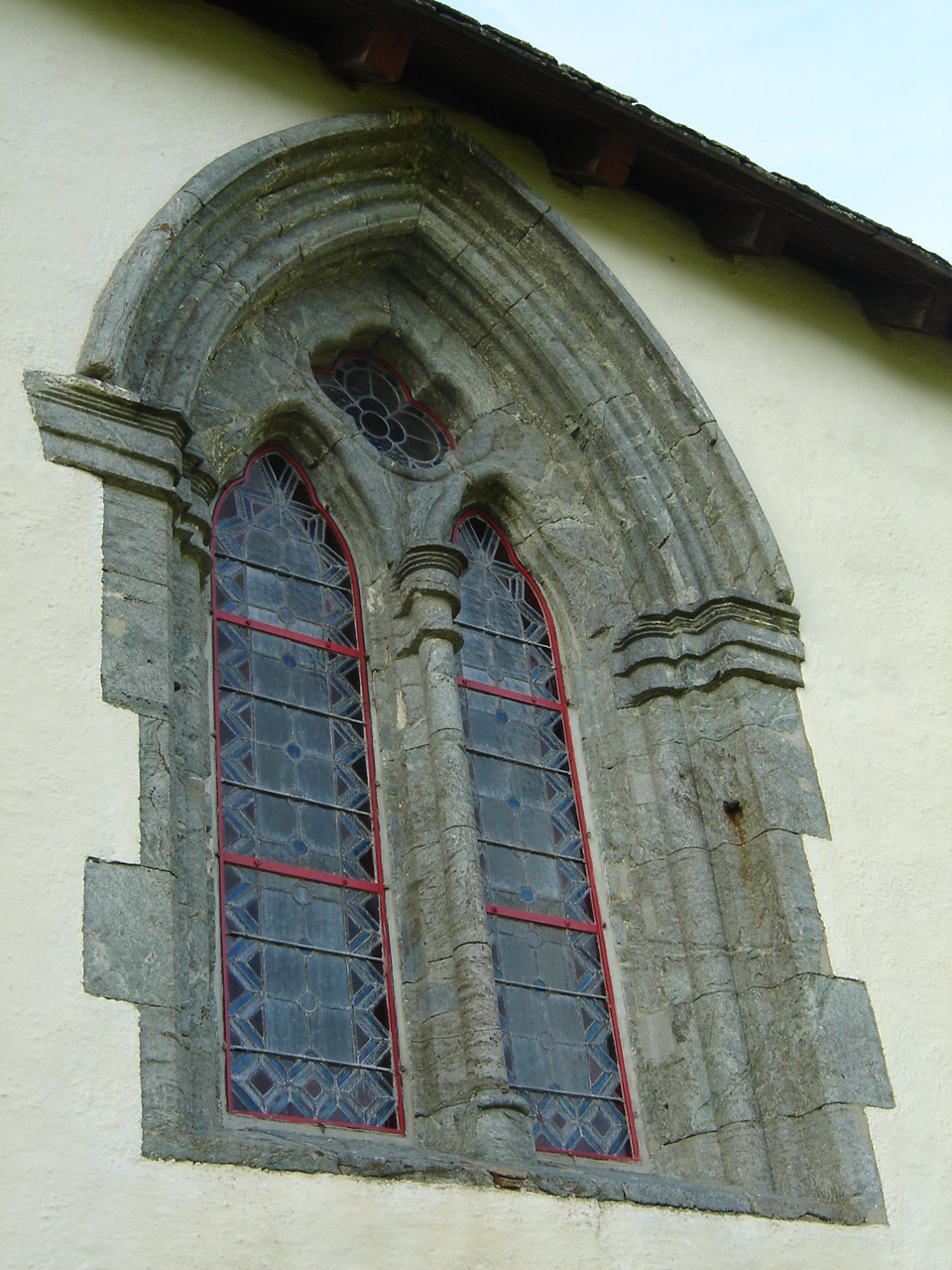
Exterior window

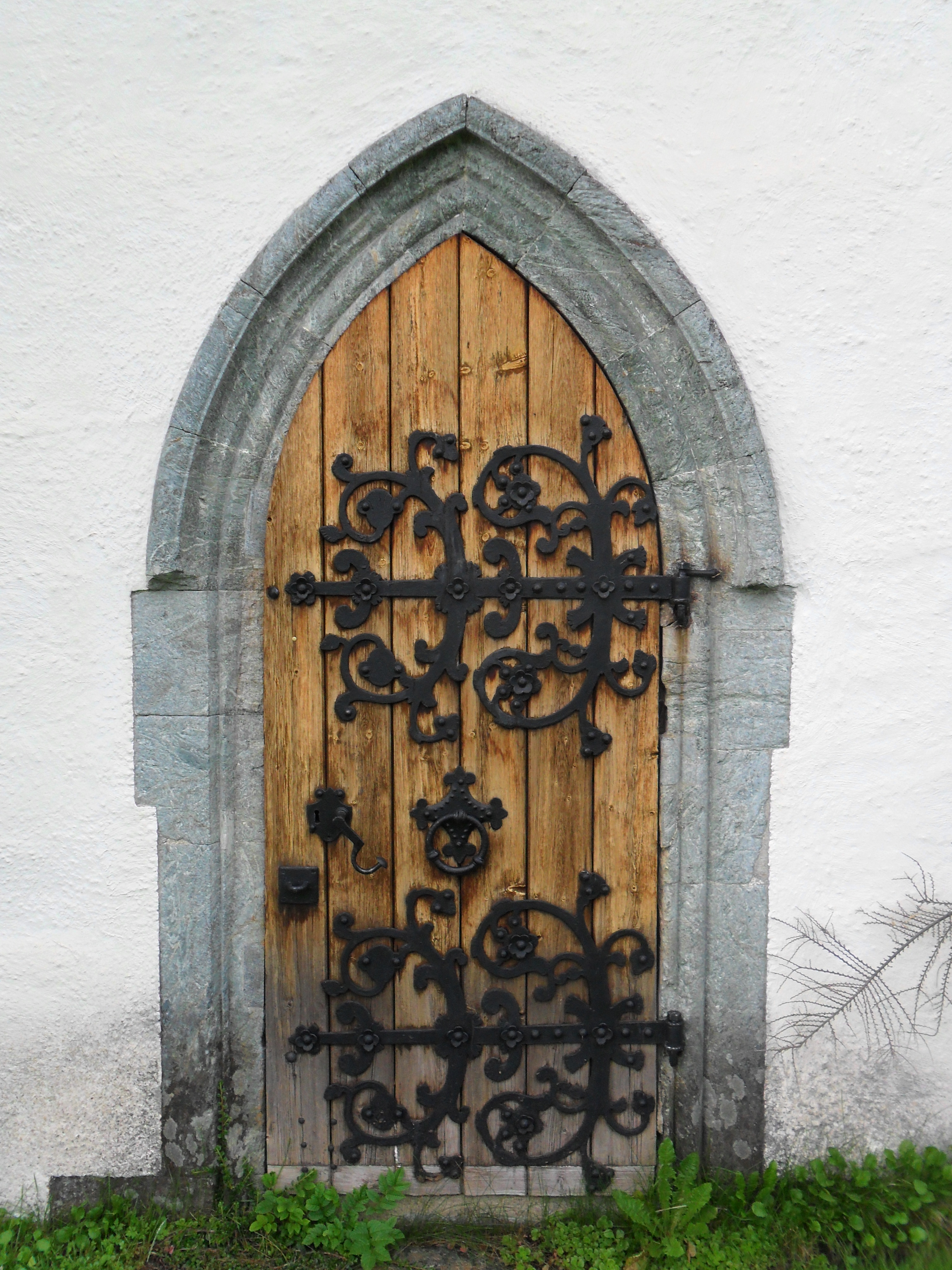
Side door

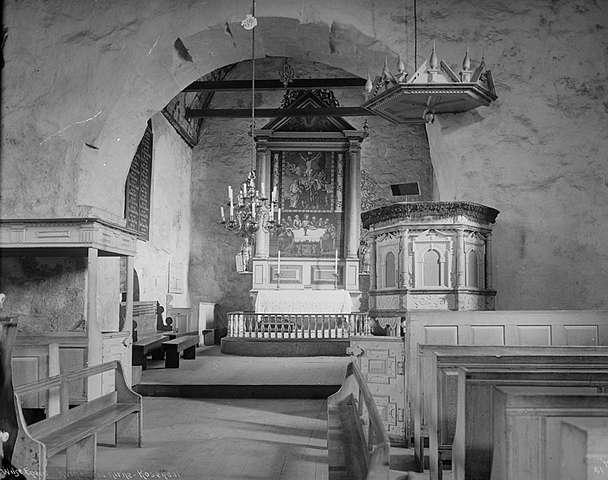
Interior view

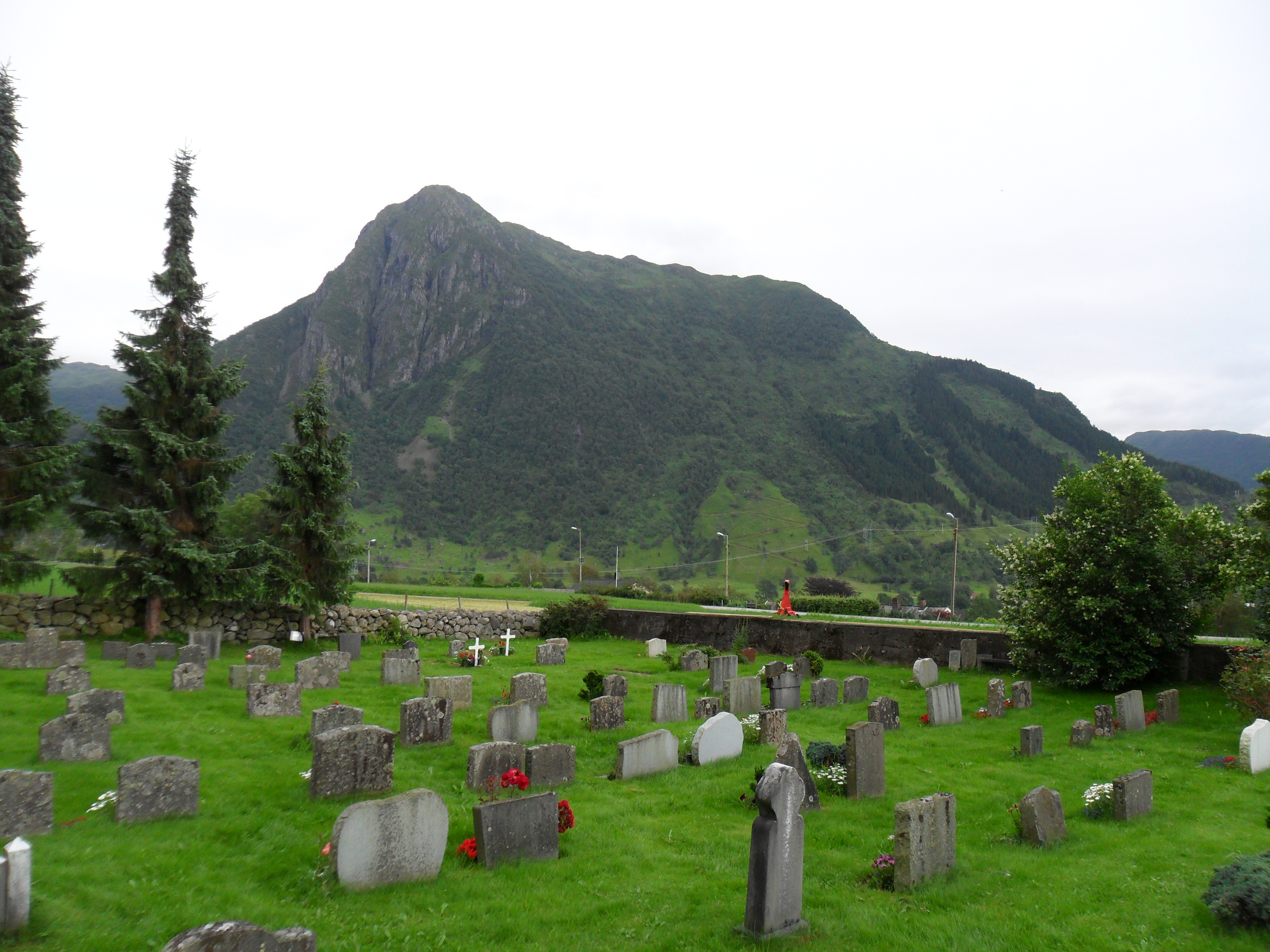
Churchyard

== See also ==
- List of churches in Bjørgvin
