= Hellesøy Verft =

Shipyard in Norway

Coordinates: 60°01′49″N 6°00′31″E

Hellesøy Verft is a small shipyard in Kvinnherad Municipality, Norway.
