= Kvinnherad Municipality =

Municipality in Vestland, Norway

Kvinnherad Municipality Kvinnherad kommune
- Municipality
- Kvinnherred herred (historic name); Quindherred herred (historic name)
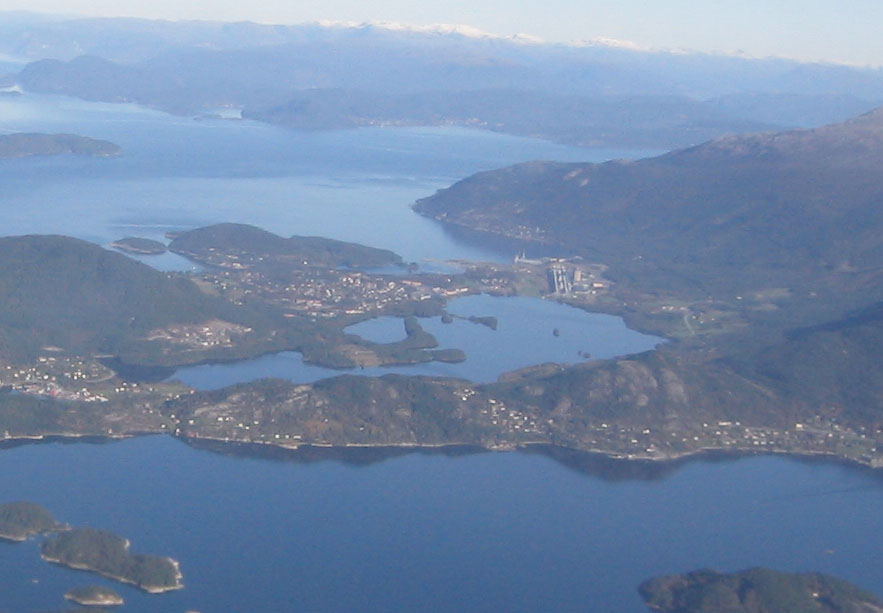
- View of the Husnes area

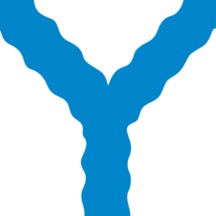
- Flag Coat of arms

- Vestland within Norway

- Kvinnherad within Vestland
- Coordinates: 59°55′41″N 06°02′13″E
- Country: Norway
- County: Vestland
- District: Sunnhordland
- Established: 1 Jan 1838
  - Created as: Formannskapsdistrikt
- Administrative centre: Rosendal

Government
  - Mayor (2023): Vegard Bjørnevik (H)

Area
  - Total: 1,090.74 km^{2} (421.14 sq mi)
  - Land: 1,042.14 km^{2} (402.37 sq mi)
  - Water: 48.6 km^{2} (18.8 sq mi) 4.5%
  - Rank: #104 in Norway
- Highest elevation: 1,648.03 m (5,406.9 ft)

Population (2025)
  - Total: 13,175
  - Rank: #94 in Norway
  - Density: 12.1/km^{2} (31/sq mi)
  - Change (10 years): ▼ −1.1%
- Demonym: Kvinnhering

Official language
  - Norwegian form: Nynorsk
- Time zone: UTC+01:00 (CET)
  - Summer (DST): UTC+02:00 (CEST)
- ISO 3166 code: NO-4617
- Website: Official website

Kvinnherad is a municipality in Vestland county, Norway. It is located in the traditional district of Sunnhordland, along the Hardangerfjorden. The administrative centre of the municipality is the village of Rosendal. The largest village is Husnes, with about 6,000 people living in or near the village. Other villages include Ænes, Åkra, Dimmelsvik, Eidsvik, Hatlestranda, Herøysund, Høylandsbygda, Ølve, Sæbøvik, Sunndal, Sunde, Uskedalen, and Valen.

The 1,090.74-square-kilometre (421.14 sq mi) municipality is the 104th largest by area out of the 357 municipalities in Norway. Kvinnherad Municipality is the 94th most populous municipality in Norway with a population of 13,175. The municipality's population density is 12.1 inhabitants per square kilometre (31/sq mi) and its population has decreased by 1.1% over the previous 10-year period.

In the southern part of Kvinnherad you will find the typical fjord landscape of western Norway. The areas of Mauranger and Rosendal have narrow fjords, wild water-falls, and the nearby Folgefonna, the third biggest glacier in Norway.

== General information ==
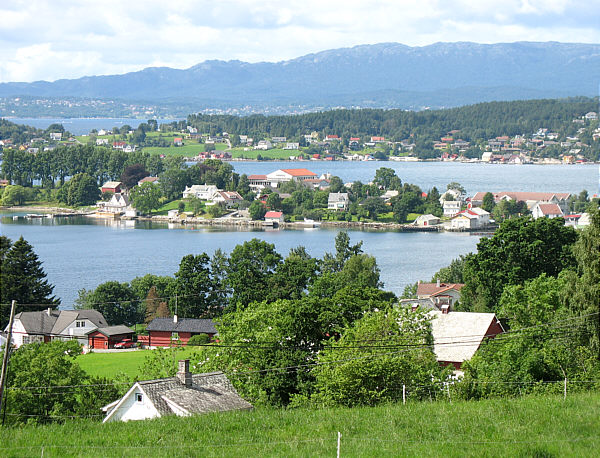
View of the Sæbøvik area

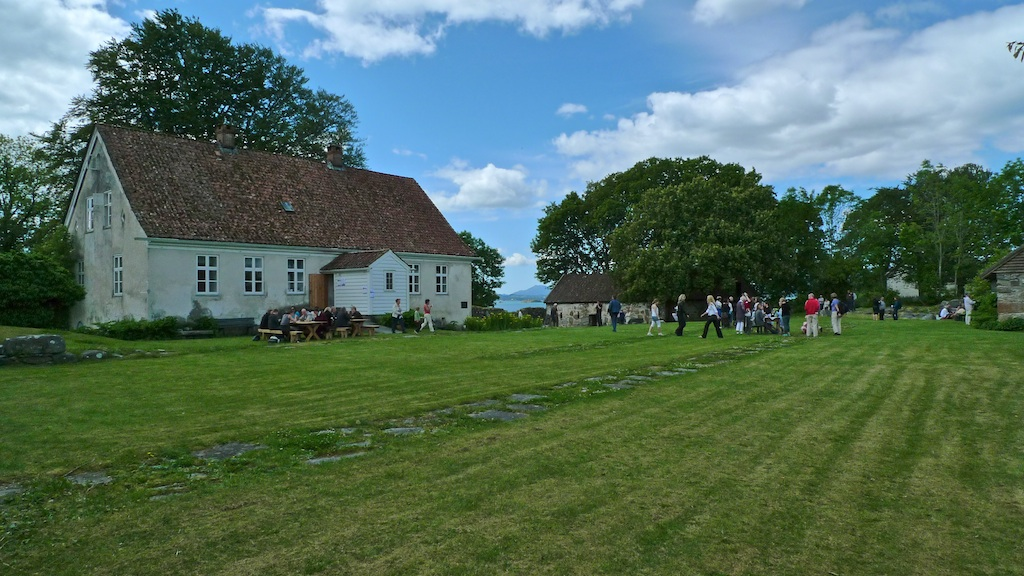
View of Halsnøy Abbey

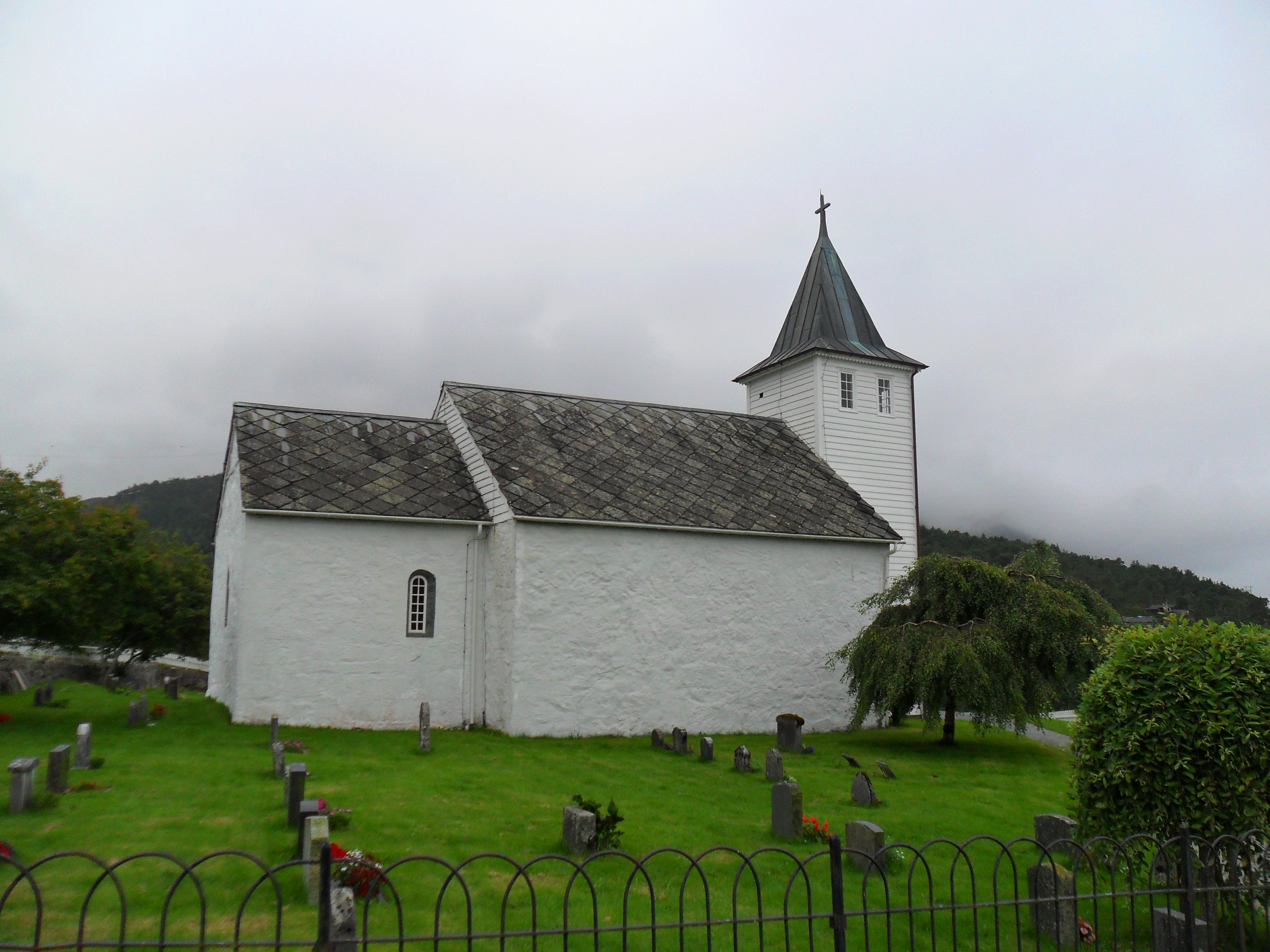
The 13th-century Ænes Church

The parish of Qvindherred was established as a municipality on 1 January 1838 (see formannskapsdistrikt law). On 1 January 1907, a small area northwest of the villages of Ølve and Husa (population: 67) was transferred from neighboring Tysnes Municipality to Kvinnherad Municipality.

During the 1960s, there were many municipal mergers across Norway due to the work of the Schei Committee. On 1 January 1965, the following areas were merged into one large Kvinnherad Municipality:

- All of Skånevik Municipality that was located north of the Skånevikfjorden-Åkrafjorden and west of the Åkra area (population: 1,189)
- All of Fjelberg Municipality (population: 2,308)
- All of the old Kvinnherad Municipality (population: 5,831)
- Most of Varaldsøy Municipality (population: 511), except for the Mundheim area which became part of Kvam Municipality

On 1 January 2013, the southwestern part of the Folgefonna peninsula (south of Kysnesstranda) was transferred from Kvinnherad Municipality to the neighboring Jondal Municipality. This removed forty residents and 37.1 square kilometres (14.3 sq mi) of land area from Kvinnherad Municipality.

Historically, this municipality was part of the old Hordaland county. On 1 January 2020, the municipality became a part of the newly-formed Vestland county (after Hordaland and Sogn og Fjordane counties were merged).

=== Name ===
The municipality (originally the parish) is named after the old name for the area (Old Norse: Kvinnaherað). The first element may be derived from the word tvinnr which means "double", likely referring to the two rivers running through Rosendal, the administrative centre of the municipality. The last element is herað which means "district" or "countryside".

The municipal name has been spelled several ways throughout history. Before 1889, the name was written Quindherred, then in 1889 the spelling was "modernized" to Kvinnherred. At that time, all municipalities in Norway were titled herred (which was used similarly to the word "municipality"), so it was formally named Kvinnherred herred, which looked a little repetitive.

On 3 November 1917, a royal resolution changed the spelling of the name of the municipality to Kvinnherad, using the Nynorsk spelling instead of the Bokmål spelling.

=== Coat of arms ===
The coat of arms was granted on 18 June 1982. The official blazon is "Argent, a pall wavy azure" (Norwegian: På kvit grunn ein blå gaffelkross laga med bølgjesnitt). This means the arms have a field (background) has a tincture of argent which means it is commonly colored white, but if it is made out of metal, then silver is used. The ordinary is a pall with wavy edges. The design of the arms show the confluence of two blue rivers into one on a white or silver background. The rivers symbolize the many streams and rivers in the municipality, especially the Hattebergselvi and the Melselvi, that come together just before they run into the sea at Rosendal. The arms were designed by Truls Nygaard, after a proposal by Magnus Hardeland. The municipal flag has the same design as the coat of arms.

=== Churches ===
The Church of Norway has nine parishes (sokn) within Kvinnherad Municipality. It is part of the Sunnhordland prosti (deanery) in the Diocese of Bjørgvin.

Churches in Kvinnherad Municipality
Parish (sokn)	Church name	Location of the church	Year built
Fjelberg og Eid	Eid Church	Eidsvik	1824
Fjelberg og Eid	Fjelberg Church	Fjelbergøya	1722
Hatlestrand	Hatlestrand Church	Hatlestranda	1885
Husnes og Holmedal	Holmedal Church	Utåker	1815
Husnes og Holmedal	Husnes Church	Husnes	1874
Husnes og Holmedal	Valen Church	Valen	1978
Kvinnherad	Kvinnherad Church	Rosendal	c. 1250
Uskedalen	Uskedal Church	Uskedalen	1914
Varaldsøy	Varaldsøy Church	Varaldsøy	1885
Ænes	Ænes Church	Ænes	c. 1200
Ølve	Ølve Church	Ølve	1861
Åkra	Åkra Church	Åkra	1735

== Economy ==
The economy of Kvinnherad Municipality is based on the rich water resources within its boundaries. This includes power production, aluminium production (Sør-Norge Aluminium), fish farming, shipbuilding (Eidsvik Skipsbyggeri, Hellesøy Verft, Bergen Group Halsnøy), and lifeboat production (Umoe Schat-Harding, Norsafe, Eide Marine Tech, Noreq). These industries are spread throughout the municipality.

Kvinnherad has two local newspapers, Kvinnheringen and Grenda, as well as a local TV channel, TV Sydvest.

== Government ==
Kvinnherad Municipality is responsible for primary education (through 10th grade), outpatient health services, senior citizen services, welfare and other social services, zoning, economic development, and municipal roads and utilities. The municipality is governed by a municipal council of directly elected representatives. The mayor is indirectly elected by a vote of the municipal council. The municipality is under the jurisdiction of the Haugaland og Sunnhordland District Court and the Gulating Court of Appeal.

=== Municipal council ===
The municipal council (Kommunestyre) of Kvinnherad Municipality is made up of 35 representatives that are elected to four year terms. The tables below show the current and historical composition of the council by political party.

Kvinnherad kommunestyre 2023–2027
Party name (in Nynorsk)	Number of representatives
Labour Party (Arbeidarpartiet)	6
Progress Party (Framstegspartiet)	3
Green Party (Miljøpartiet Dei Grøne)	1
Conservative Party (Høgre)	9
Industry and Business Party (Industri‑ og Næringspartiet)	5
Christian Democratic Party (Kristeleg Folkeparti)	2
Centre Party (Senterpartiet)	5
Socialist Left Party (Sosialistisk Venstreparti)	3
Liberal Party (Venstre)	1
Total number of members:	35

Kvinnherad kommunestyre 2019–2023
Party name (in Nynorsk)	Number of representatives
Labour Party (Arbeidarpartiet)	7
Progress Party (Framstegspartiet)	3
Green Party (Miljøpartiet Dei Grøne)	2
Conservative Party (Høgre)	9
Christian Democratic Party (Kristeleg Folkeparti)	2
Centre Party (Senterpartiet)	8
Liberal Party (Venstre)	1
Joint list of the Red Party (Raudt) and the Socialist Left Party (Sosialistisk Venstreparti)	3
Total number of members:	35

Kvinnherad kommunestyre 2015–2019
Party name (in Nynorsk)	Number of representatives
Labour Party (Arbeidarpartiet)	8
Progress Party (Framstegspartiet)	3
Green Party (Miljøpartiet Dei Grøne)	1
Conservative Party (Høgre)	12
Christian Democratic Party (Kristeleg Folkeparti)	2
Centre Party (Senterpartiet)	6
Liberal Party (Venstre)	1
Joint list of the Red Party (Raudt) and the Socialist Left Party (Sosialistisk Venstreparti)	2
Total number of members:	35

Kvinnherad kommunestyre 2011–2015
Party name (in Nynorsk)	Number of representatives
Labour Party (Arbeidarpartiet)	9
Progress Party (Framstegspartiet)	5
Conservative Party (Høgre)	11
Christian Democratic Party (Kristeleg Folkeparti)	3
Centre Party (Senterpartiet)	3
Socialist Left Party (Sosialistisk Venstreparti)	1
Liberal Party (Venstre)	2
Population Party (Innbyggjarpartiet)	1
Total number of members:	35

Kvinnherad kommunestyre 2007–2011
Party name (in Nynorsk)	Number of representatives
Labour Party (Arbeidarpartiet)	7
Progress Party (Framstegspartiet)	5
Conservative Party (Høgre)	4
Christian Democratic Party (Kristeleg Folkeparti)	3
Centre Party (Senterpartiet)	4
Socialist Left Party (Sosialistisk Venstreparti)	1
Liberal Party (Venstre)	5
Population Party (Innbyggjarpartiet)	1
Cross-Party Common List (Tverrpolitisk samlingsliste)	1
Independent Centre (Uavhengig sentrum)	1
Total number of members:	35

Kvinnherad kommunestyre 2003–2007
Party name (in Nynorsk)	Number of representatives
Labour Party (Arbeidarpartiet)	8
Progress Party (Framstegspartiet)	8
Conservative Party (Høgre)	4
Christian Democratic Party (Kristeleg Folkeparti)	3
Red Electoral Alliance (Raud Valallianse)	1
Centre Party (Senterpartiet)	9
Socialist Left Party (Sosialistisk Venstreparti)	3
Liberal Party (Venstre)	2
Cross-Party Common List (Tverrpolitisk samlingsliste)	7
Total number of members:	45

Kvinnherad kommunestyre 1999–2003
Party name (in Nynorsk)	Number of representatives
Labour Party (Arbeidarpartiet)	11
Progress Party (Framstegspartiet)	5
Conservative Party (Høgre)	4
Christian Democratic Party (Kristeleg Folkeparti)	5
Centre Party (Senterpartiet)	8
Socialist Left Party (Sosialistisk Venstreparti)	3
Liberal Party (Venstre)	2
Cross-Party Common List (Tverrpolitisk samlingsliste)	7
Total number of members:	45

Kvinnherad kommunestyre 1995–1999
Party name (in Nynorsk)	Number of representatives
Labour Party (Arbeidarpartiet)	11
Progress Party (Framstegspartiet)	3
Conservative Party (Høgre)	2
Christian Democratic Party (Kristeleg Folkeparti)	4
Centre Party (Senterpartiet)	11
Socialist Left Party (Sosialistisk Venstreparti)	2
Liberal Party (Venstre)	1
Cross-party common list (Tverrpolitisk samlingsliste)	11
Total number of members:	45

Kvinnherad kommunestyre 1991–1995
Party name (in Nynorsk)	Number of representatives
Labour Party (Arbeidarpartiet)	6
Progress Party (Framstegspartiet)	2
Conservative Party (Høgre)	3
Christian Democratic Party (Kristeleg Folkeparti)	4
Centre Party (Senterpartiet)	13
Socialist Left Party (Sosialistisk Venstreparti)	3
Liberal Party (Venstre)	1
Cross-party common list (Tverrpolitisk samlingsliste)	13
Total number of members:	45

Kvinnherad kommunestyre 1987–1991
Party name (in Nynorsk)	Number of representatives
Labour Party (Arbeidarpartiet)	11
Progress Party (Framstegspartiet)	3
Conservative Party (Høgre)	8
Christian Democratic Party (Kristeleg Folkeparti)	6
Centre Party (Senterpartiet)	12
Socialist Left Party (Sosialistisk Venstreparti)	3
Liberal Party (Venstre)	2
Total number of members:	45

Kvinnherad kommunestyre 1983–1987
Party name (in Nynorsk)	Number of representatives
Labour Party (Arbeidarpartiet)	11
Progress Party (Framstegspartiet)	2
Conservative Party (Høgre)	11
Christian Democratic Party (Kristeleg Folkeparti)	7
Centre Party (Senterpartiet)	10
Socialist Left Party (Sosialistisk Venstreparti)	2
Liberal Party (Venstre)	2
Total number of members:	45

Kvinnherad kommunestyre 1979–1983
Party name (in Nynorsk)	Number of representatives
Labour Party (Arbeidarpartiet)	9
Conservative Party (Høgre)	12
Christian Democratic Party (Kristeleg Folkeparti)	8
New People's Party (Nye Folkepartiet)	1
Centre Party (Senterpartiet)	11
Socialist Left Party (Sosialistisk Venstreparti)	1
Liberal Party (Venstre)	2
Election list for Halsnøy and the Fjellberg islands (Valliste for Halsnøy og Fjellbergøyane)	1
Total number of members:	45

Kvinnherad kommunestyre 1975–1979
Party name (in Nynorsk)	Number of representatives
Labour Party (Arbeidarpartiet)	11
Conservative Party (Høgre)	6
Christian Democratic Party (Kristeleg Folkeparti)	10
Centre Party (Senterpartiet)	12
Socialist Left Party (Sosialistisk Venstreparti)	1
Joint list of the Liberal Party (Venstre) and New People's Party (Nye Folkepartiet)	3
Hatlestrand's list (Hatlestrand si liste)	1
Ølve's list (Ølve si liste)	1
Total number of members:	45

Kvinnherad kommunestyre 1971–1975
Party name (in Nynorsk)	Number of representatives
Labour Party (Arbeidarpartiet)	13
Conservative Party (Høgre)	4
Christian Democratic Party (Kristeleg Folkeparti)	5
Centre Party (Senterpartiet)	11
Liberal Party (Venstre)	6
Local List(s) (Lokale lister)	6
Total number of members:	45

Kvinnherad kommunestyre 1967–1971
Party name (in Nynorsk)	Number of representatives
Labour Party (Arbeidarpartiet)	11
Conservative Party (Høgre)	4
Christian Democratic Party (Kristeleg Folkeparti)	6
Centre Party (Senterpartiet)	11
Liberal Party (Venstre)	6
Local List(s) (Lokale lister)	7
Total number of members:	45

Kvinnherad kommunestyre 1963–1967
Party name (in Nynorsk)	Number of representatives
Labour Party (Arbeidarpartiet)	11
Conservative Party (Høgre)	3
Christian Democratic Party (Kristeleg Folkeparti)	5
Centre Party (Senterpartiet)	12
Liberal Party (Venstre)	6
Total number of members:	37

Kvinnherad heradsstyre 1959–1963
Party name (in Nynorsk)	Number of representatives
Labour Party (Arbeidarpartiet)	6
Conservative Party (Høgre)	3
Christian Democratic Party (Kristeleg Folkeparti)	6
Centre Party (Senterpartiet)	12
Liberal Party (Venstre)	10
Total number of members:	37

Kvinnherad heradsstyre 1955–1959
Party name (in Nynorsk)	Number of representatives
Labour Party (Arbeidarpartiet)	2
Christian Democratic Party (Kristeleg Folkeparti)	2
Local List(s) (Lokale lister)	33
Total number of members:	37

Kvinnherad heradsstyre 1951–1955
Party name (in Nynorsk)	Number of representatives
Labour Party (Arbeidarpartiet)	4
Christian Democratic Party (Kristeleg Folkeparti)	2
Local List(s) (Lokale lister)	34
Total number of members:	40

Kvinnherad heradsstyre 1947–1951
Party name (in Nynorsk)	Number of representatives
Labour Party (Arbeidarpartiet)	5
Christian Democratic Party (Kristeleg Folkeparti)	3
Local List(s) (Lokale lister)	32
Total number of members:	40

Kvinnherad heradsstyre 1945–1947
Party name (in Nynorsk)	Number of representatives
Labour Party (Arbeidarpartiet)	8
Local List(s) (Lokale lister)	32
Total number of members:	40

Kvinnherad heradsstyre 1937–1941*
Party name (in Nynorsk)	Number of representatives
Labour Party (Arbeidarpartiet)	4
Conservative Party (Høgre)	2
Joint List(s) of Non-Socialist Parties (Borgarlege Felleslister)	4
Local List(s) (Lokale lister)	30
Total number of members:	40
Note: Due to the German occupation of Norway during World War II, no elections were held for new municipal councils until after the war ended in 1945.

=== Mayors ===
The mayor (Nynorsk: ordførar) of Kvinnherad Municipality is the political leader of the municipality and the chairperson of the municipal council. The following people have held this position:

- 1838–1845: Elias Børge Unger
- 1846–1849: Christian Lerche Dahl
- 1850–1851: Gabriel Andreas Heiberg
- 1852–1855: Samson Torsen Stueland
- 1856–1857: Christian Lerche Dahl
- 1858–1861: Hans H. Helland
- 1862–1862: O. Matthiesen
- 1862–1865: Ole L. Berget
- 1866–1867: Lars Olsen Skeie
- 1868–1869: Hans H. Helland
- 1870–1873: Clemmet Gerhardsen Roalstveit
- 1874–1875: Michael L. Langballe
- 1876–1881: Ole Andreas Olsen (V)
- 1882–1885: Godskalk Knudsen Aarsand (V)
- 1886–1893: Andreas Lavik (MV)
- 1894–1898: Ivar Arnesen (V)
- 1899–1916: Axel Lea (V)
- 1917–1941: Ingemar Traavik (Bp)
- 1942–1945: Einar Tvedt (NS)
- 1945–1949: Ingemar Traavik (Bp)
- 1949–1955: Lars Eikeland (V)
- 1956–1959: Magnus Aksnes (V)
- 1960–1963: Knut Skaaluren (Sp)
- 1964–1971: Berge Sæberg (Sp)
- 1972–1975: Jens Arnesen (H)
- 1976–1979: Berge Sæberg (Sp)
- 1980–1985: Jens Arnesen (H)
- 1986–1993: Thorleif J. Hellesøy (Sp)
- 1994–1995: Eirik Meyer Eide (KrF)
- 1995–2003: Aksel Kloster (Ap)
- 2003–2007: Bjarne Berge (LL)
- 2007–2015: Synnøve Solbakken (Ap)
- 2015–2019: Peder Sjo Slettebø (H)
- 2019–2021: Hans Inge Myrvold (Sp)
- 2021–2023: Hilde Enstad (Ap)
- 2023–present: Vegard Bjørnevik (H)

== Geography ==
The municipality is located along the large Hardangerfjorden, mostly on the southeast side of the fjord on the Folgefonna peninsula, but also a small part on the other side. It includes several notable islands in the fjord including Varaldsøy, Fjelbergøya, Borgundøya, and Halsnøya.

The large Folgefonna National Park, which surrounds the Folgefonna glacier, is partially located in Kvinnherad. The northern part of the municipality is often referred to as Mauranger. It is the area surrounding the Maurangsfjorden. The notable Bondhusbrea glacier is located just south of that fjord, near the village of Sunndal. The Jondal Tunnel and Folgefonna Tunnel both connect Mauranger with neighboring Ullensvang Municipality by cutting through the large mountains surrounding Mauranger.

The municipality has many large lakes including Blådalsvatnet, Juklavatnet, and Opsangervatnet. Many of these lakes are utilized for hydroelectric power generation. The highest point in the municipality is the 1,648.03-metre (5,406.9 ft) tall point on the Søndre Folgefonna glacier.

== Population ==
Historical population

Year	Pop.	±% p.a.
1845	4,044	—
1855	4,532	+1.15%
1865	4,547	+0.03%
1875	4,627	+0.17%
1891	4,760	+0.18%
1900	5,045	+0.65%
1910	5,108	+0.12%

Year	Pop.	±% p.a.
1920	5,272	+0.32%
1930	5,293	+0.04%
1946	5,701	+0.47%
1951	5,638	−0.22%
1960	5,514	−0.25%
1970	11,811	+7.92%
1980	12,821	+0.82%

Year	Pop.	±% p.a.
1990	13,121	+0.23%
2000	13,196	+0.06%
2010	13,187	−0.01%
2020	13,071	−0.09%
2023	13,058	−0.03%

Note: The municipal borders were changed in 1965, causing a significant change in the population.
Source: Statistics Norway and Norwegian Historical Data Centre

== Tourism and places of interest ==
Kvinnherad is a popular tourist location because of its natural landscape as well as several places of interest. The most notable of which include Kvinnherad Church, the Bondhusbrea glacier, the shipping mural in Høylandsbygda, and Radiohola. Rosendal, the administrative centre of the municipality, is the site of the greatest tourist attraction in Kvinnherad: the Barony Rosendal. The Barony is the only one of its kind in Norway. It is a museum, which offers valuable information about the Union with Denmark, an important period of Norwegian history. It was one of the locations of the 1958 film "The Vikings" starring Kirk Douglas, Tony Curtis, Janet Leigh and Ernest Borgnine. Many of the citizens of Kvinnherad/Hardanger, Norway were used as extras.

== Media gallery ==
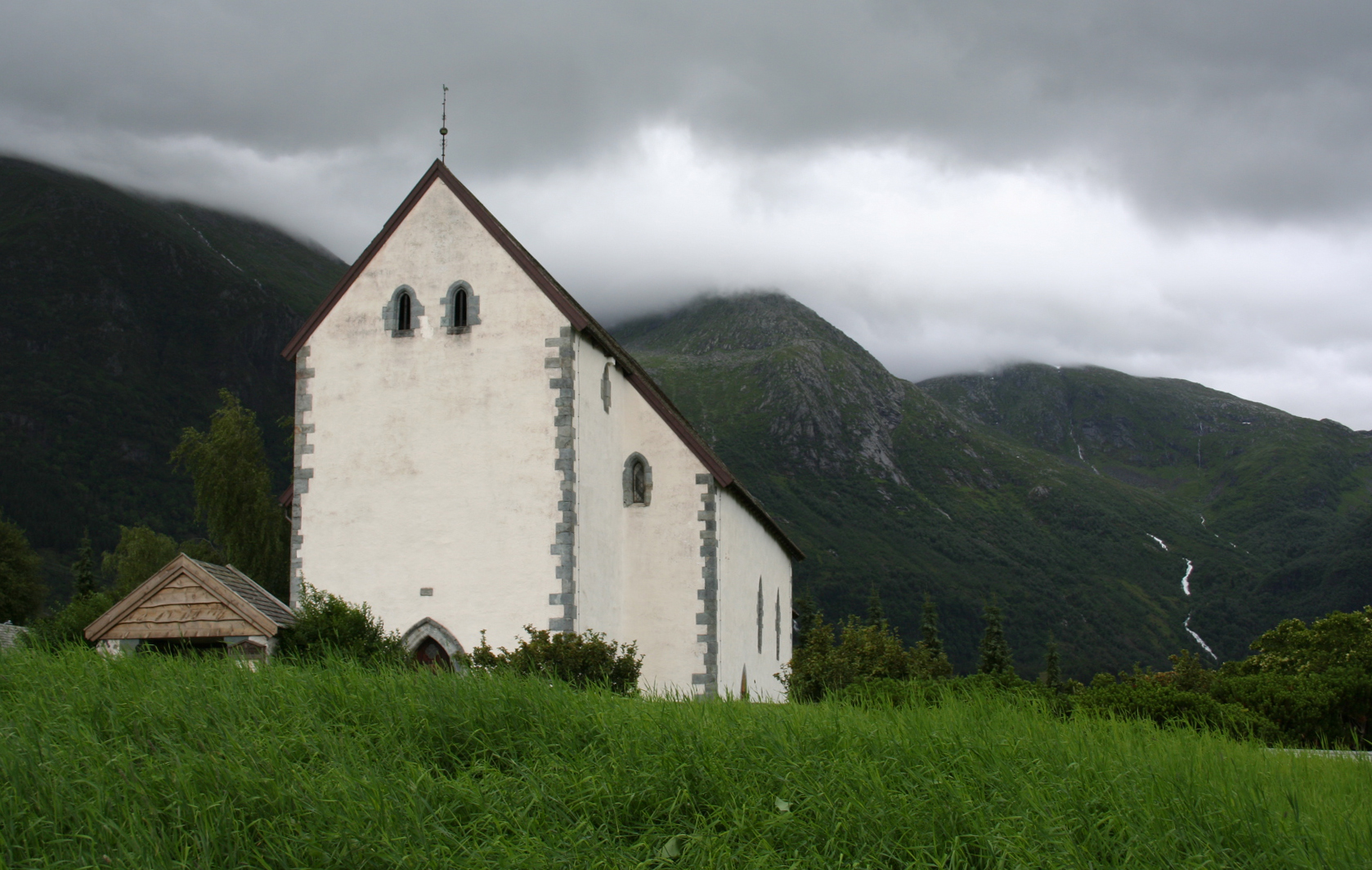
Kvinnherad Church in Rosendal

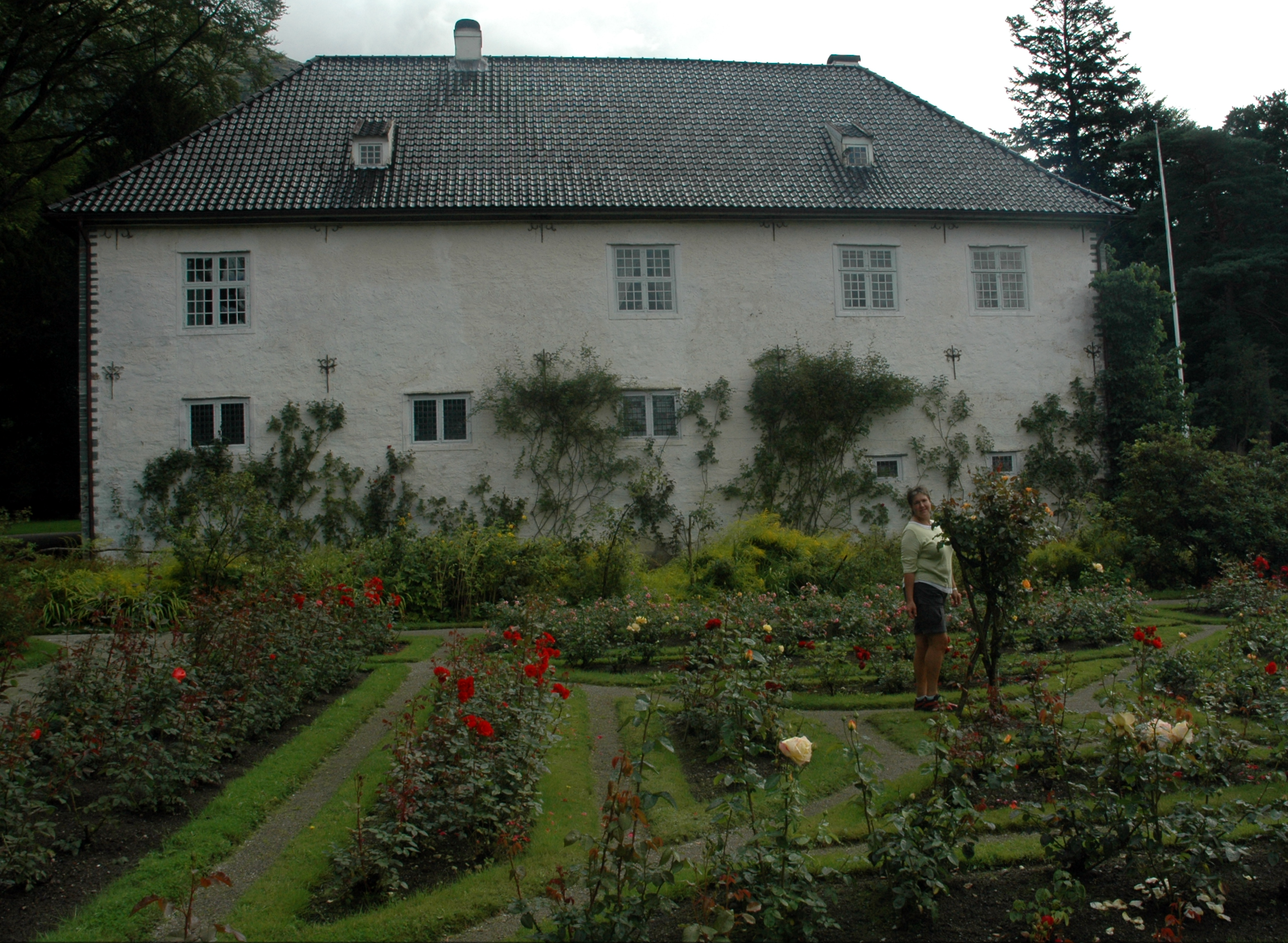
The Barony Rosendal

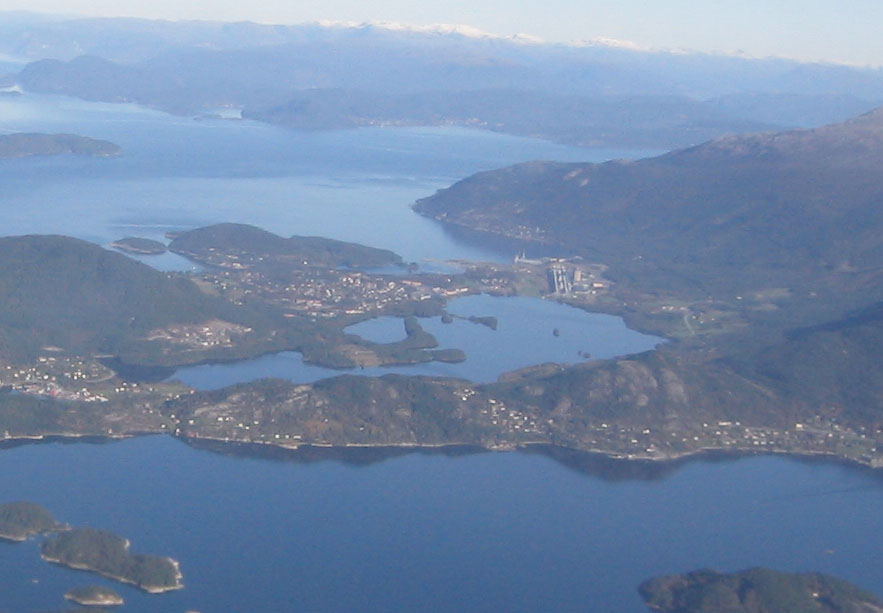
Husnes and the Hardangerfjord

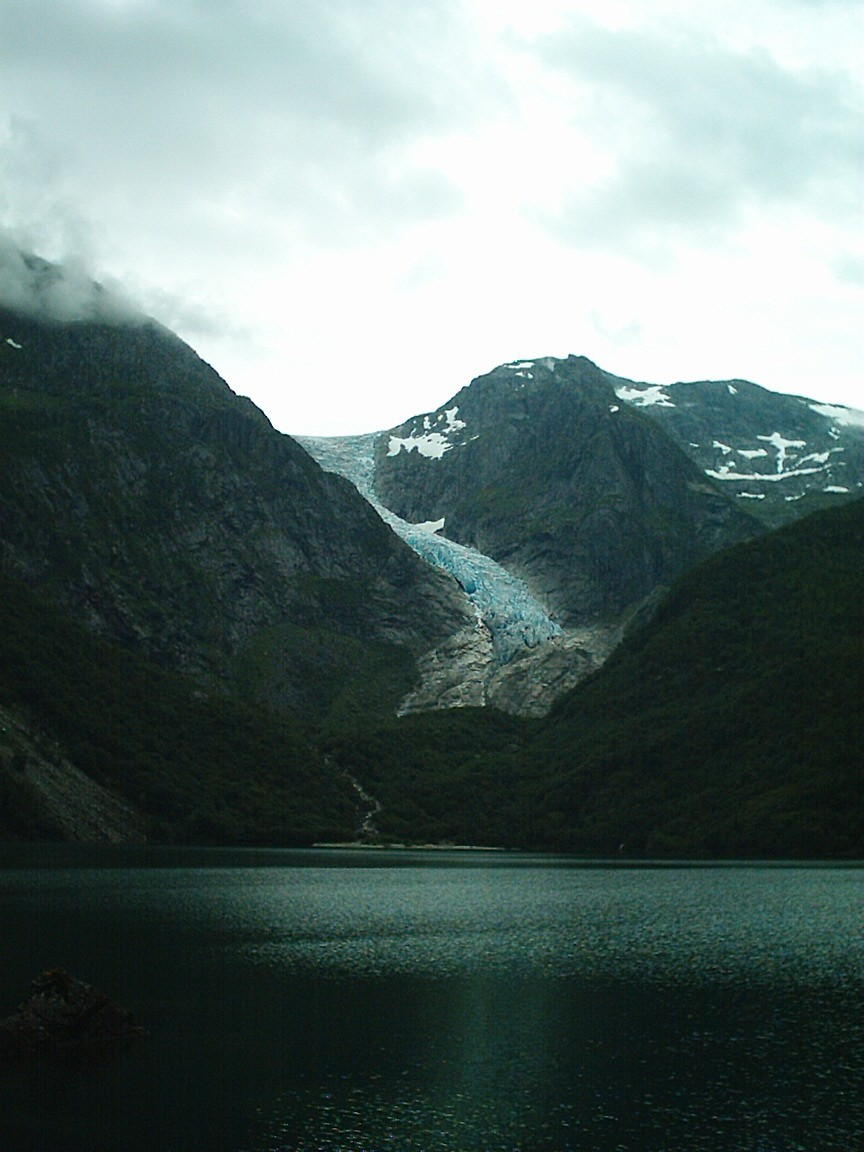
Bondhusbreen glacier

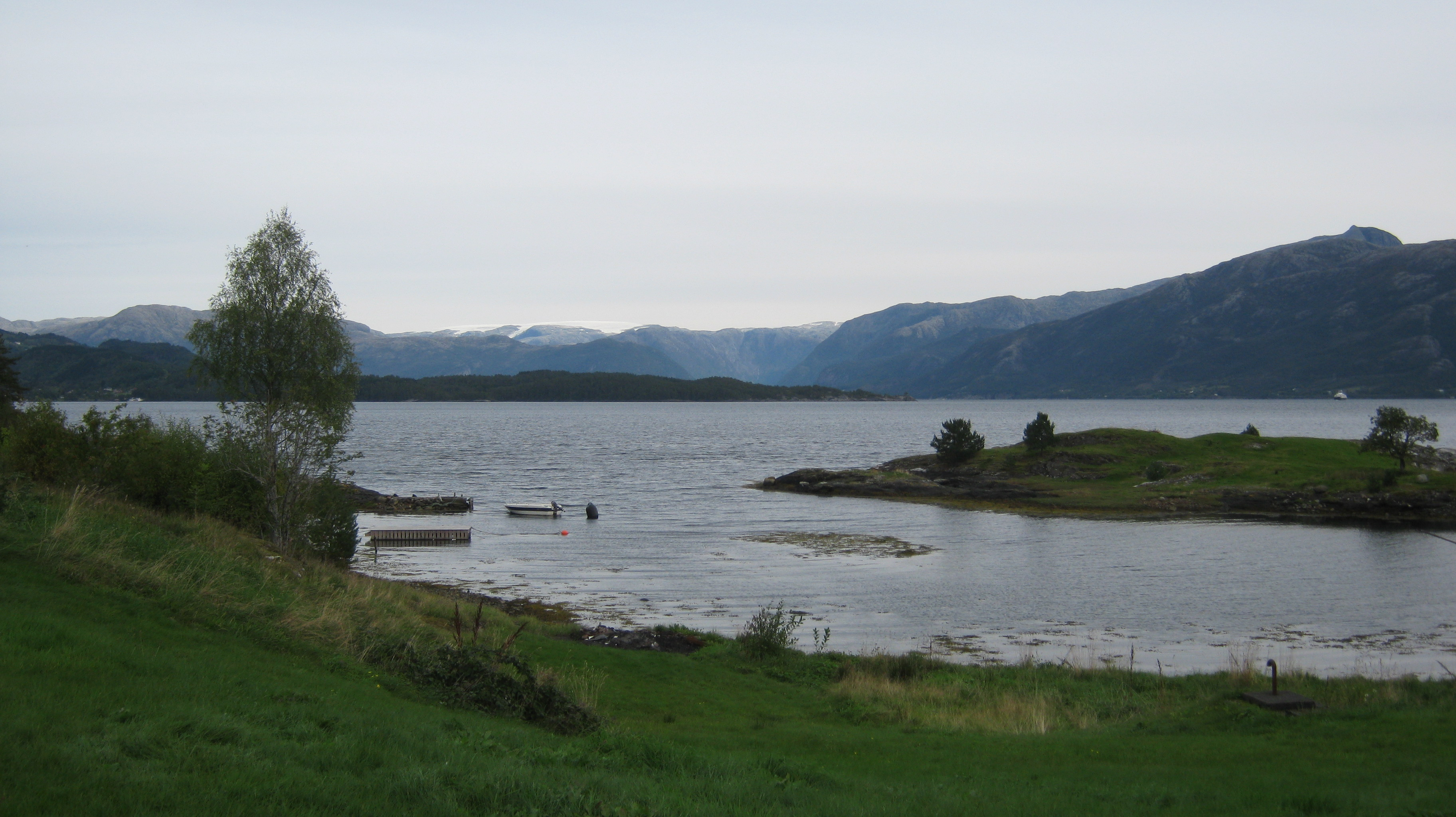
View from Gjermundshamn across the Hardangerfjord, with Varaldsøy island and Folgefonna glacier

== Notable people ==
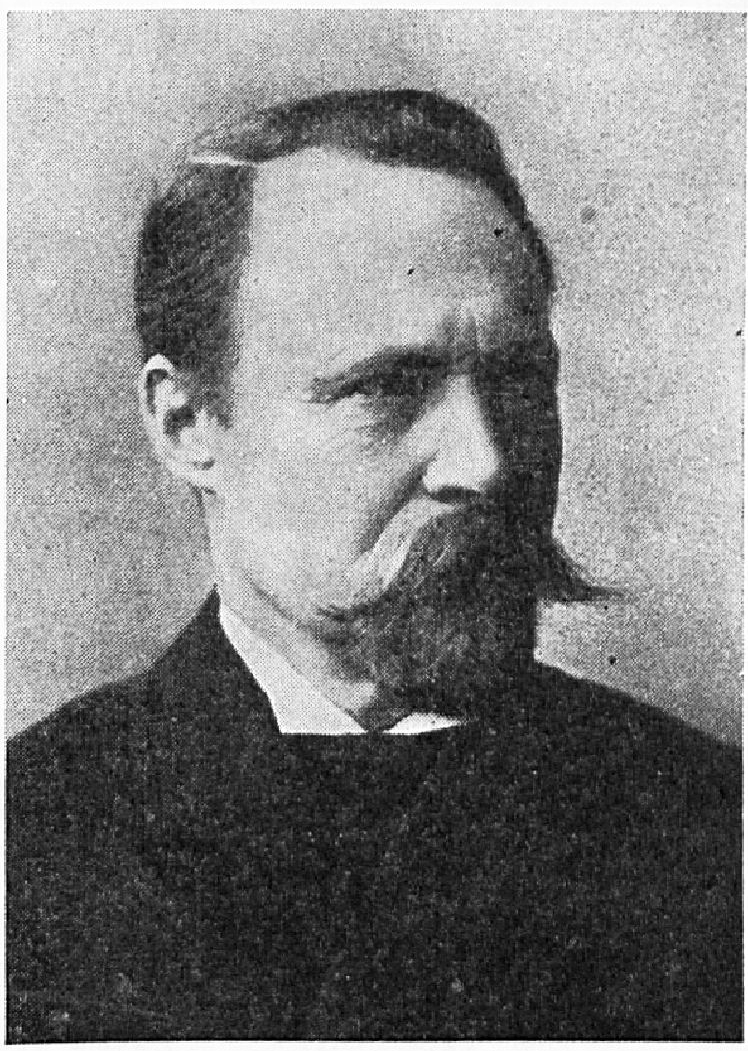
Jens Tvedt, 1935

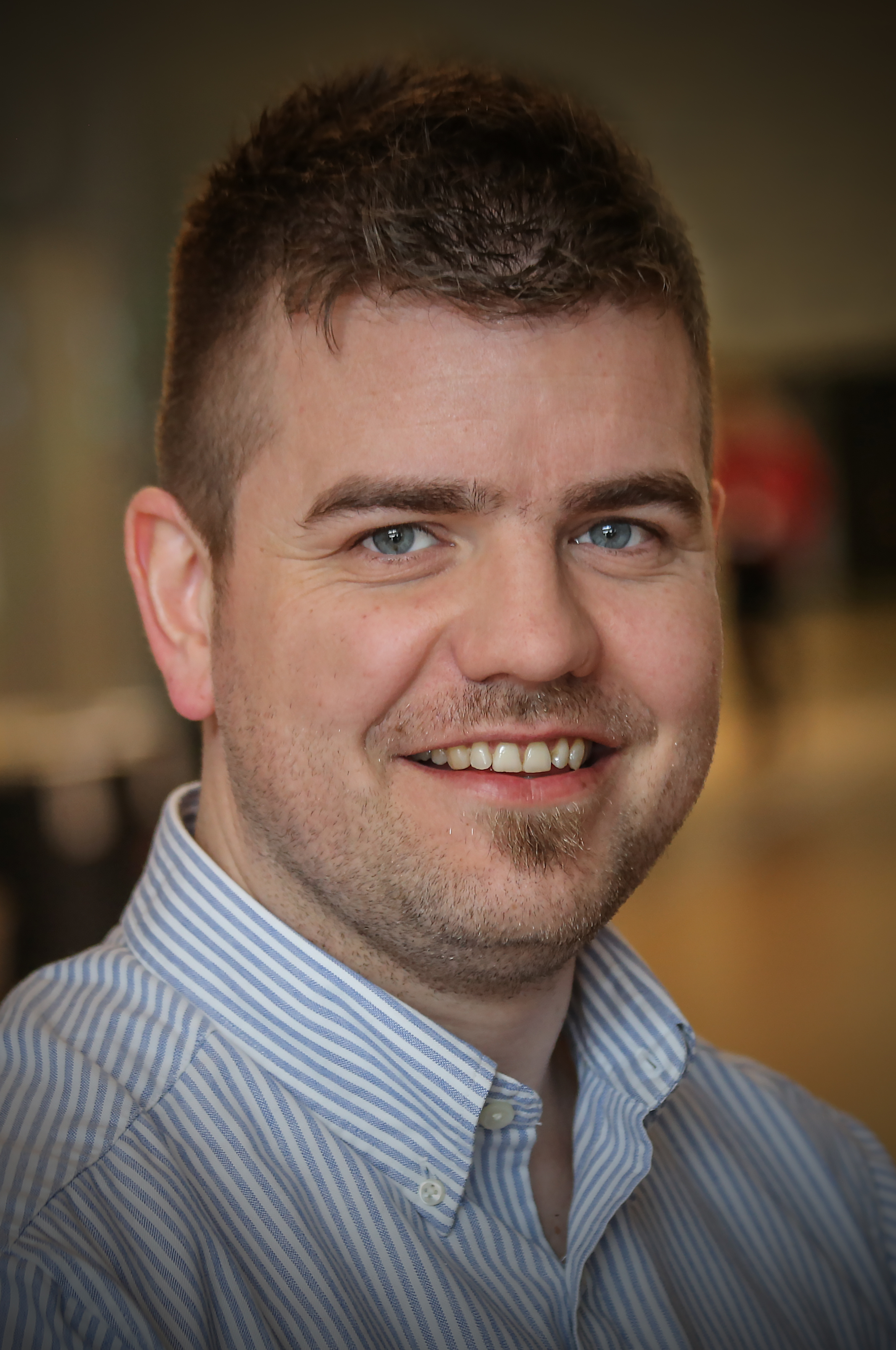
Hans Inge Myrvold, 2017

- Axel Gyntersberg (ca.1525 – 1588 in Kvinnherad), a Norwegian nobleman and feudal overlord
- Johannes Lauritsson (ca.1540 – ca.1620), a wealthy landowner who lived Valen 1563–1578
- Axel Rosenkrantz (1670 in Kvinnherad – 1723), a landowner and baron who owned the Barony Rosendal
- Andreas Lavik (1854–1918), a revivalist, temperance advocate, magazine editor, farmer, headmaster, and politician who lived in Kvinnherad from 1885 where he was Mayor for eight years
- Jens Tvedt (1857 in Kvinnherad – 1935), a novelist and writer of short stories
- Gisle Midttun (1881 in Kvinnherad – 1940), a cultural historian and museologist
- Olav Midttun (1883 in Mauranger – 1972), a philologist, biographer, and magazine editor
- Ragnvald Vaage (1889 in Husnes – 1966), a poet, novelist, and children's writer
- Sigurd Valvatne DSO DSC (born 1913 in Kvinnherad), a naval officer and submariner
- Frank Meidell Falch (1920 in Kvinnherad – 2013), a media director and politician
- Egil Myklebust (born 1942 in Kvinnherad), a businessperson, lawyer, and CEO of SAS Group
- Lars Amund Vaage (born 1952 at Sunde), a novelist
- Endre Hellestveit (born 1976 in Rosendal), an actor
- Hans Inge Myrvold (born 1985), a Norwegian politician and mayor of Kvinnherad in 2019
- Erlend Bratland (born 1991 in Husnes), a singer who won Norske Talenter in 2008
