= Axel Rosenkrantz =

Norwegian landowner and baron (1670–1723)

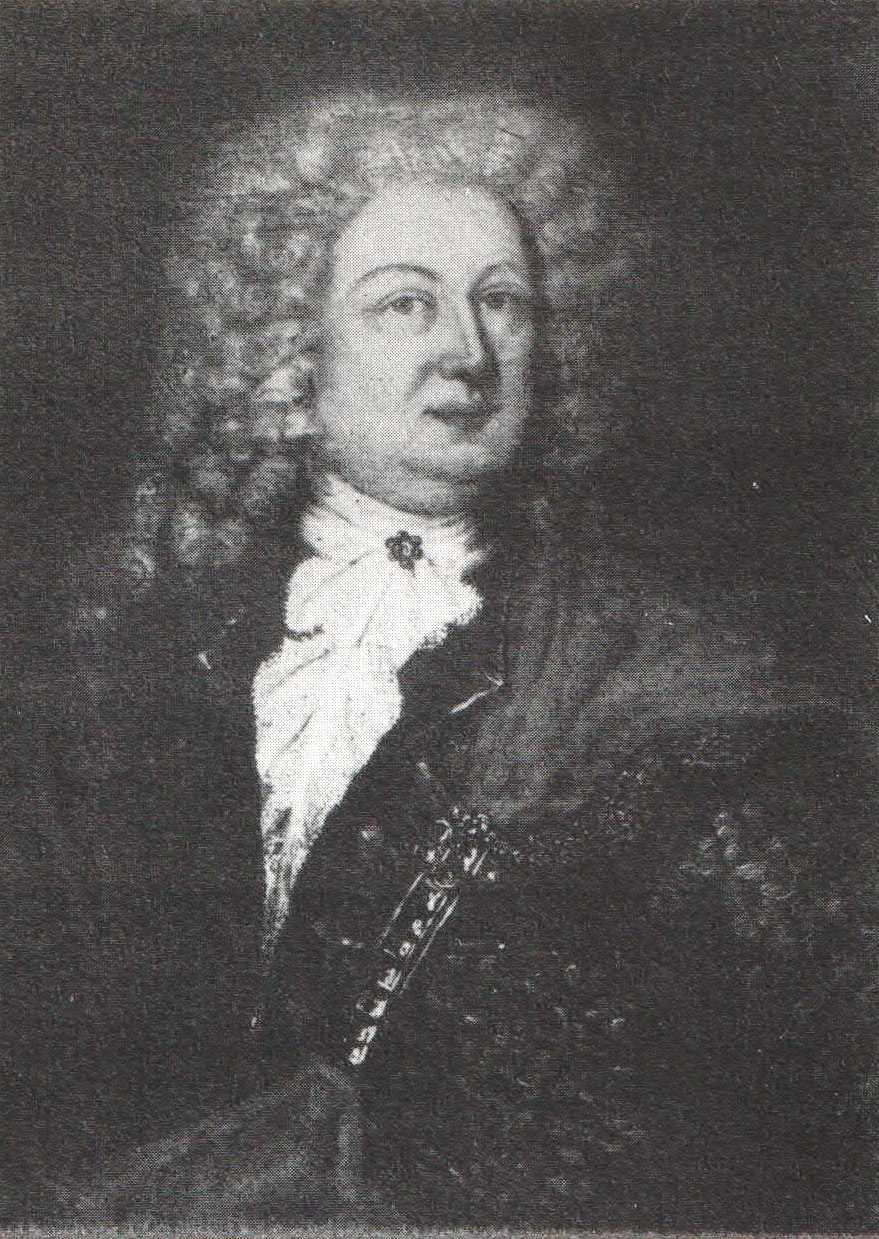
- Born: 12 December 1670; Kvinnherad, Norway
- Died: 14 November 1723 (aged 52); Kvinnherad, Norway
- Occupations: Landowner and baron
- Parent(s): Ludvig Rosenkrantz; Karen Mowat
- Relatives: Justine Cathrine Rosenkrantz (sister); Axel Mowat (grandfather)

Axel Rosenkrantz (12 December 1670 – 14 November 1723) was a Norwegian landowner and baron.

== Personal life ==
Axel Rosenkrantz was born in Kvinnherad on 12 December 1670 to baron Ludvig Rosenkrantz and Karen Mowat. He was married to Anne Godtzen from 1709.

== Career ==
Rosenkrantz was the owner of the Barony Rosendal for a period of 32 years, and spent most of his time running his properties. He also served as county governor of Bergenhus amt from 1696 to 1703. He had no sons, and his daughters all died young. After his death the barony was taken over by the Crown, while his other properties were inherited by his wife and relatives.

He died in Kvinnherad in 1723.

Government offices
Preceded by Hans Nielsen	County Governor of Bergenhus amt 1697–1702	Succeeded by Christian Stockfleth
