= Rosenkrantz (noble family) =

Noble family

- Nobility
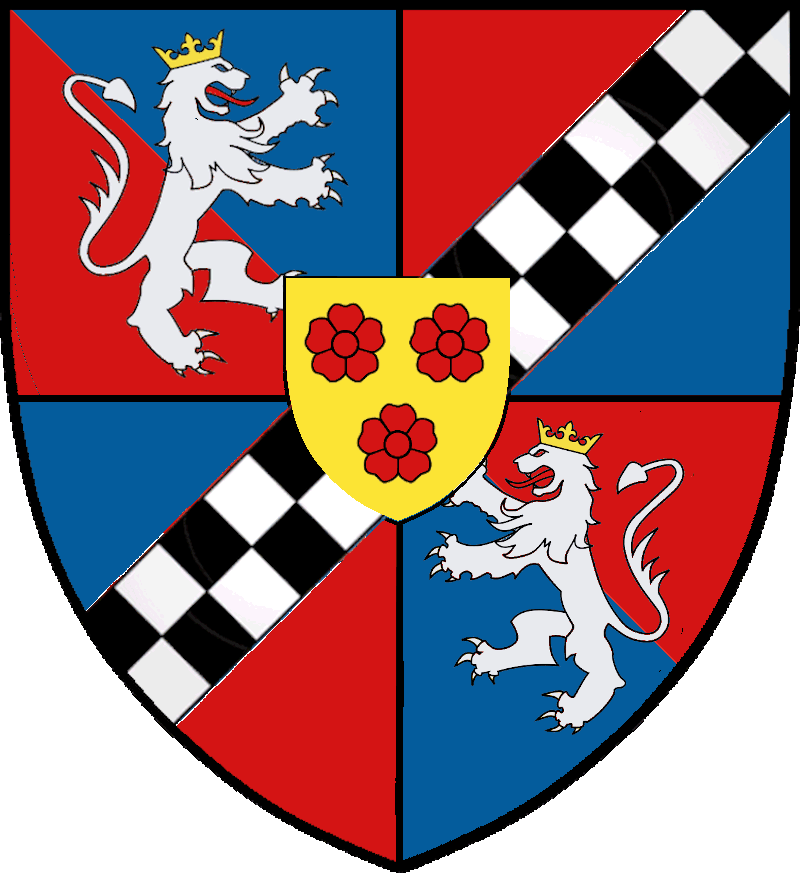
- Heraldic shield of the Rosenkrantz coat of arms
- Country: Denmark; Norway; Sweden; Germany
- Place of origin: Vivild, Norddjurs
- Titles: Baron of Hoff-Rosencrone; Baron of Rosendal

The Rosenkrantz family (one line spelled Rosencrantz) is the name of a family which belongs to initially Danish, and later Norwegian, Swedish and German nobility. The family is known since the 14th century and belongs to the old and high nobility. It has played a prominent role in Denmark and Norway, its members having been estate owners as well as high officials.

The surname appears in William Shakespeare's tragedy The Tragedy of Hamlet, Prince of Denmark (see: Rosencrantz and Guildenstern).

== Rosenkrantz in Denmark ==
The Rosenkrantz family were initially landowners in Denmark, with subsequent branches in both Norway and Sweden. The Danmarks Adels Aarbog ("Yearbook of the Danish Nobility") gives details of the following family lines:

=== Line I: Hevringholm ===
The Hevringholm line consists of the family's oldest known members in the Vivild parish in Norddjurs (c. 1300–1600).

=== Line II: Boller with the so-called "Legitimised Line" ===
The Boller line, which includes the barons Rosenkrantz of Rosendal, is named for its estate at Boller. This line emanated from line I, with Erik Rosenkrantz (died 1503) marrying in 1456 Sophie Henriksdatter Gyldenstierne (1430–1477), the heiress of Boller. In 1618/1619 – five generations later – Holger Rosenkrantz (died 1638) sold Boller to Ellen Marsvin (1572–1649), the widow of Ludvig Munk, who in 1607 married secondly Knud Rud, and whose daughter Kirsten Munk had in 1615 married King Christian IV (1577–1648). In 1630 the King made Ellen transfer Boller (and Rosenvold) to her sole child, her daughter Kirsten Munk.

The so-called "Legitimised Line" is an unnecessary creation, suggesting that it was illegitimate before; it was begun by the Boller-descendant Holger Rosenkrantz (1599–1634), who was a soldier in Danish and Dutch service and apparently had been abroad for so long that no one remembered him, so that his sons Ludvig (fief baron of Rosendal in 1678) and Maximilian (at Nyboellegaard) had to prove that Holger's father was Frederick Rosenkrantz (1571–1602) of the Boller line.

=== Line III: Arreskov ===
The Arreskov line descends from the Boller line Faaborg on Funen, when in 1558 Erik Rosenkrantz (1520–1575) married Helvig Jacobsdatter Hardenberg (1540–1599), heiress of Arreskov.

=== Line IV: Rosenholm ===
The Rosenholm line descends from Jørgen Ottesen Rosenkrantz (1523–1596) of the Boller line, who acquired an estate at Rosenholm. This line became extinct in the paternal line in 1802 with the death of Frederik Christian Rosenkrantz (1724–1802).

=== Line V: Villestrup (baronial) ===
The baronial line of Villestrup, a side line of line IV. This line descends from Baron Werner Rosenkrantz til Villestrup (1700–1777), who in 1757 received the royal patent for this fief barony. In 1802, the head of this line inherited the family seat of Rosenholm, and all present Danish members of the Rosenkrantz family, belong to this line.

=== Line VI: Brusgaard / Barritskov ===
The Brusgaard / Barritskov line, founded by Holger Rosenkrantz (1645–1704), is also a side line of line IV. Niels Rosenkrantz (1757–1824) of the Brusgaard line had inherited the Barritskov estate (near Hedensted in Midtjylland) from Staatsminister Frederik Christian Rosenkrantz, according to whose will it was transferred to Niels Rosenkrantz and became the family estate. The line became extinct in 1838 with the death of Marcus Giøe Rosenkrantz (1762–1838).

=== Line VII: Rydhave ===
Rydhave near Vinderup in Jutland descends from Stensballegaard, which in around 1440 descended from Hevringholm. The son of Axel Rosenkrantz (1472–1551) at Stensballegaard and Rydhave, Niels Rosenkrantz (1505–1581) inherited a share in Rydhave and subsequently in 1551 acquired the shares of his brothers.

=== Line VIII: Glimminge ===
The Glimminge line started from the Rydhave line with Erik Rosenkrantz (born 1516) marrying firstly in 1551 Margrethe Boergesdatter Ulfstand (died 1582), the heiress of Glimminge Skåne. Among his descendants were Holger Axelsen Rosenkrantz (1586–1647) of Glimmingehus etc. and Palle Rosenkrantz (1587–1642) of Krenkerup on Lolland, Noerregaard and Rosenlund. The line ended with Eleonore Gustaviane Rosenkrantz (1737–1825), when Glimminge had already been integrated into a fideimommiss.

=== Line IX: Older Scanian line ===
The older Scanian line (Ørup line) emanated from the Rydhave line, when Erik Rosenkrantz (born 1516) in 1551 married firstly Margrethe Ulfstand (see Rydhave). Oerup was inherited by his son Boerge (died 1614). The family remained on the Ørup estate after Skåne in 1660 was ceded to Sweden. Holger Rosenkrantz (1688–1758) was in 1752 naturalized as Swedish nobleman under the surname Rosencrantz. They seem to have held Oerup until 1840, the line continuing at least until the end of the 20th century.

=== Line X: Newer Scanian line ===
The newer Scanian line, which emanated from line IX in the beginning of the 18th century. Members of this family are still living in Sweden.

=== Line XI: Southern Jutlandic line / Soenderjyske linie at Kogsboel ===
The Southern Jutlandic line, which emanated from line I (Hevringholm) before 1355 (death of Erik Rosenkrantz at Hevringholm) and ended with the death after 1625 of Carsten Rosenkrantz at Gribsgaard, Kambo and Kogsboel, who outlived his son Bendix (died 1622).

== Rosenkrantz in Norway ==
=== Rosenkrantz Tower ===
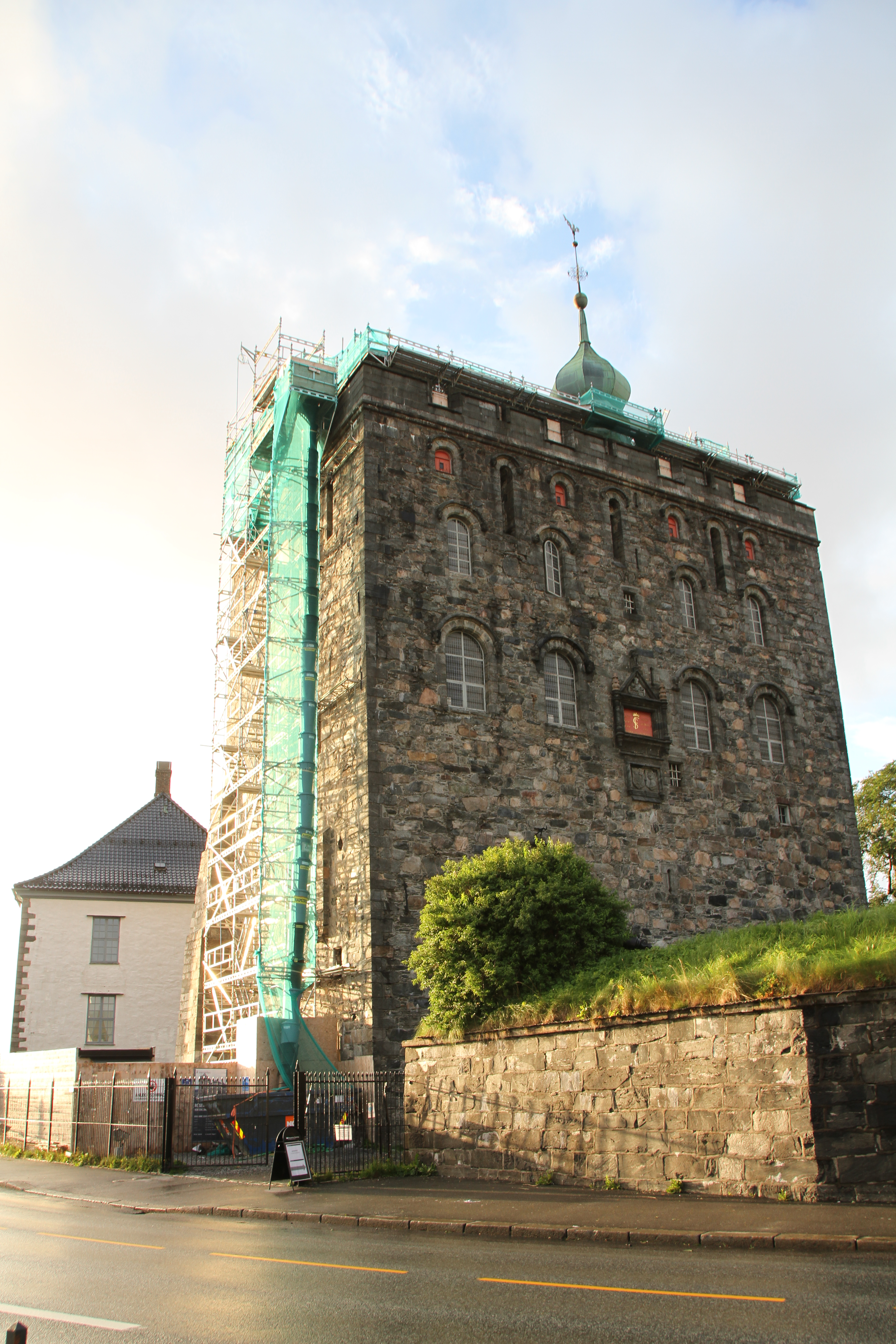
Rosenkrantz Tower in Bergen

Rosenkrantz Tower (Rosenkrantztårnet) is located near Vågen in Bergen, Norway. Parts of the tower date back to the 1270s, but have been rebuilt several times. Erik Ottesen Rosenkrantz (1519–1575) was governor of Bergenhus Fortress from 1560 to 1568. In 1562, Rosenkrantz decided to build a combined defense and residence tower with five floors and facade towards Bryggen. The work was carried out by Scottish masons and the finished building had many common features with fortified Scottish towers of the time period.

=== Barony of Rosendal ===
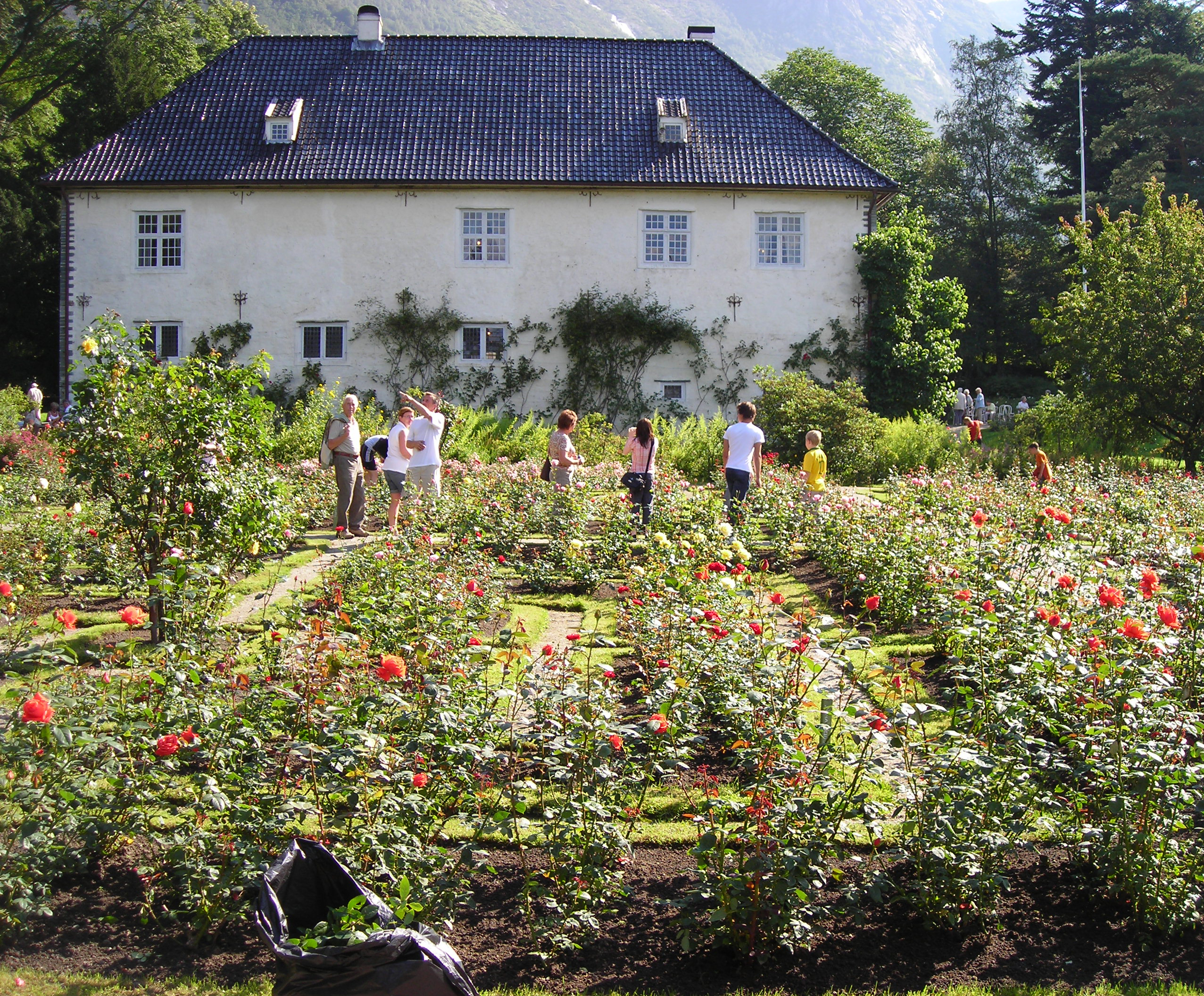
Rose Garden at Rosendal

The history of Rosendal dates back to the 1650s, when Ludwig Holgersen Rosenkrantz (1628–1685) came to Bergen as commissioner of war for the Danish king. At a ball at the fortress of Bergenhus, he met Karen Axelsdatter Mowat (1630–1675), sole heiress to the largest fortune in the country at the time. Her father Axel Mowat (1592–1661) was a great land-owner, and had more than 550 farms all over Western Norway. They married in 1658, and were subsequently given the farm Hatteberg in Rosendal (in the present-day Kvinnherad Municipality) as a wedding present. In 1661, Ludwig Rosenkrantz started building his own manor at Rosendal. He completed this in 1665. In 1678, King Christian V of Denmark gave the estate the status of Barony of Rosendal (Baroniet Rosendal). It was and remained the only fief barony in Norway.

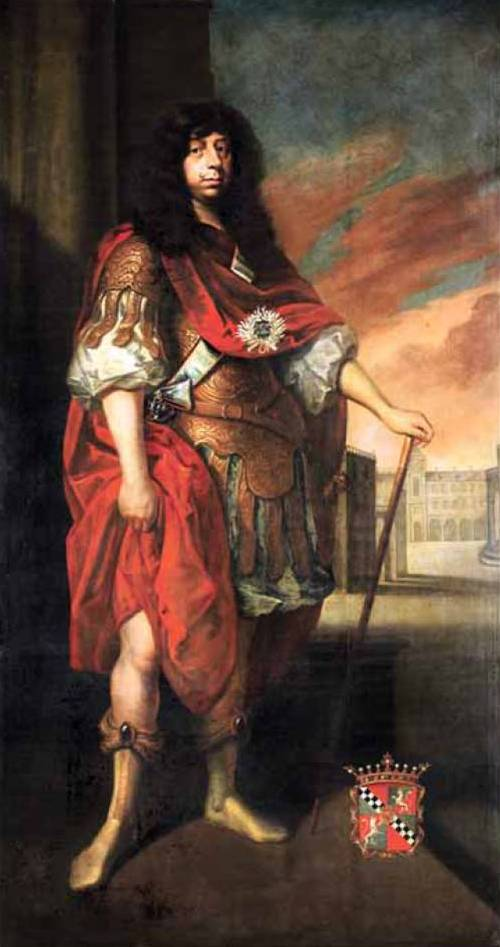
Baron Ludvig Holgersen Rosenkrantz

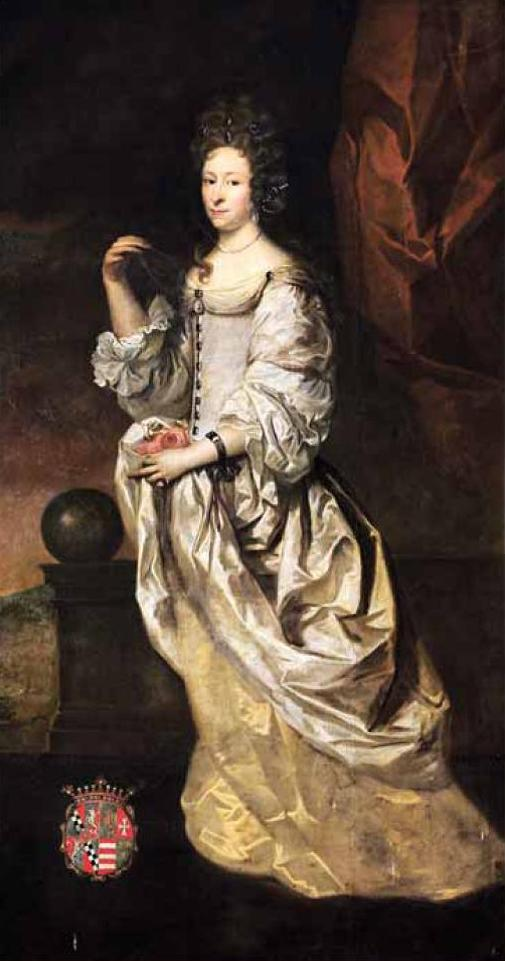
Baroness Karen Rosenkrantz, née Mowat

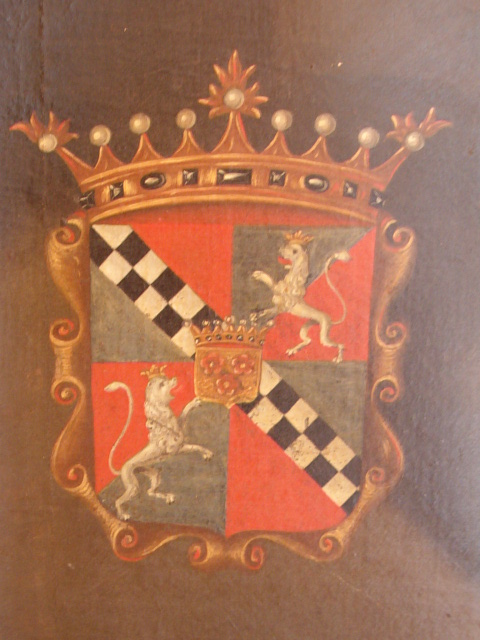
Coat of arms of the Baron of Rosendal

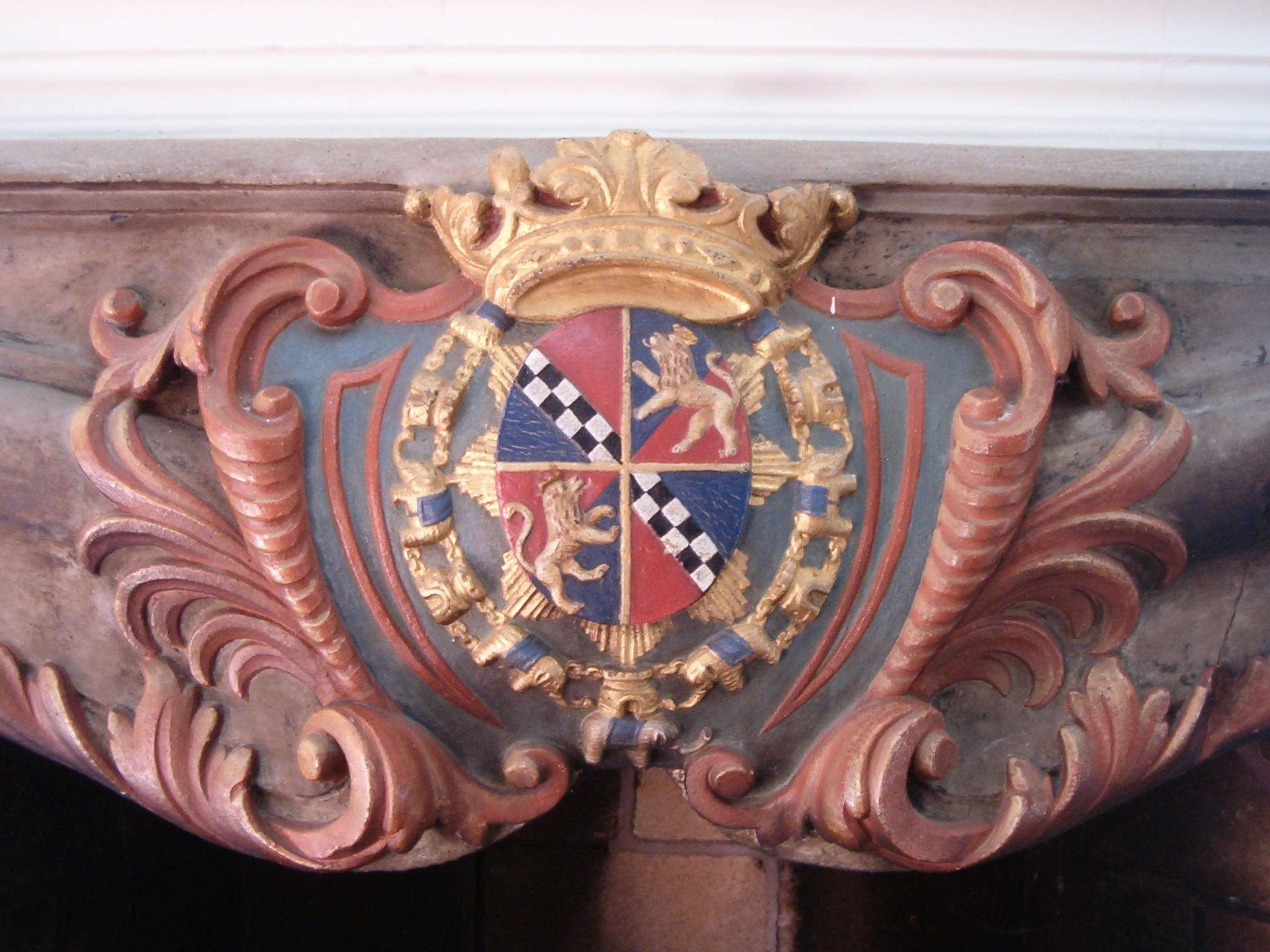
Coat of arms of Iver Rosenkrantz (born 1674)

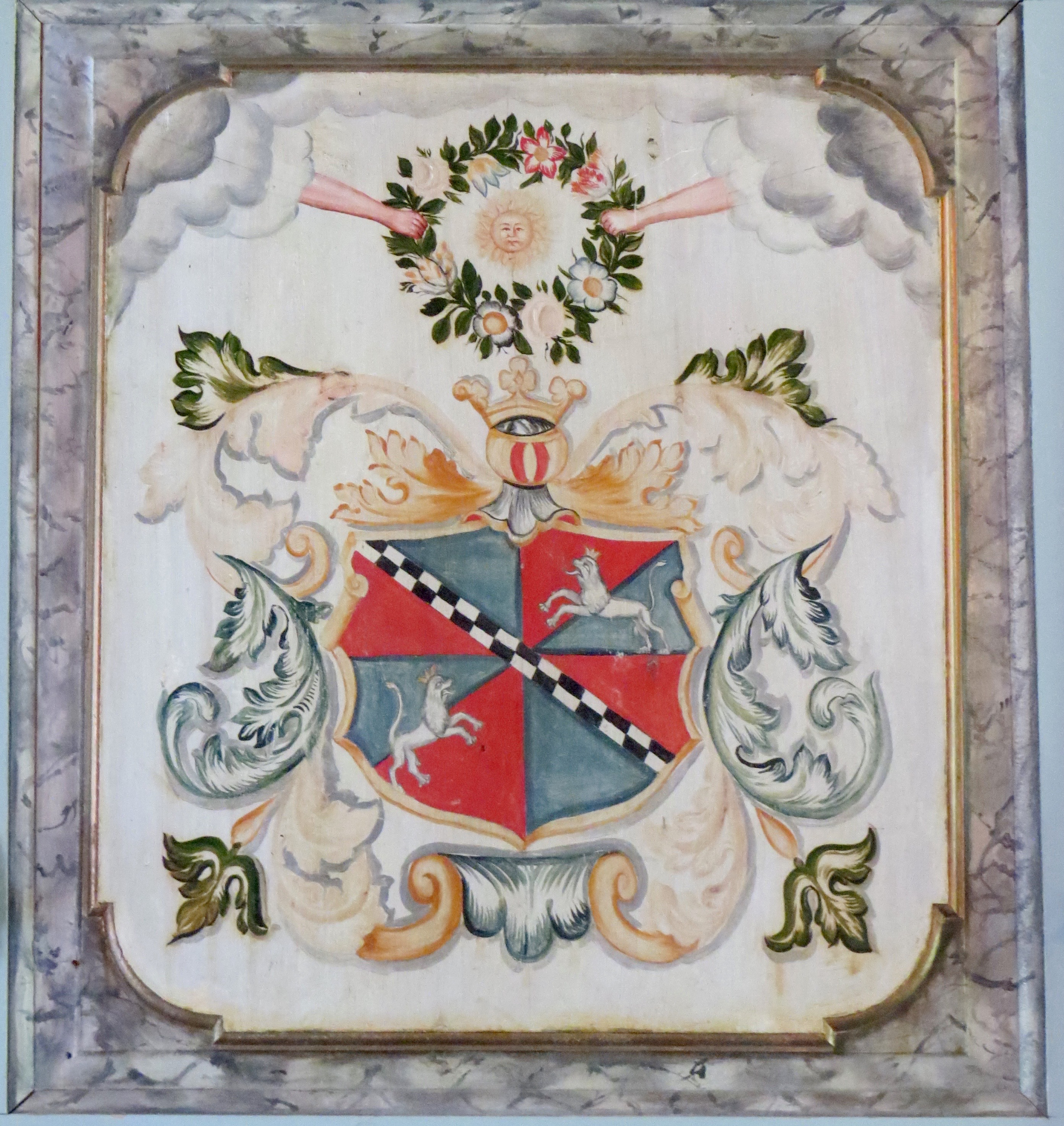
Coat of arms of Anne Beate Rosenkrantz (1707–1777)

== Rosenkrantz in Germany ==
Some family members served as officers in the Prussian Army. Also, several German noble families have come about through association of names, which are derived from the Rosenkrantz in the female line, such as Moltke-Rosenkrantz, Düring-Rosenkrantz or Weber von Rosenkrantz.

== Name ==
Rosenkrantz can be translated as "rose wreath" or "rosary". The family's name appears to be derived from the coat of arms, in which we find a wreath of heraldic roses instead of the usual torse between the helm and the crest.

Union General William Rosecrans, a descendant of said family, had a variant of said name.

== Coat of arms ==
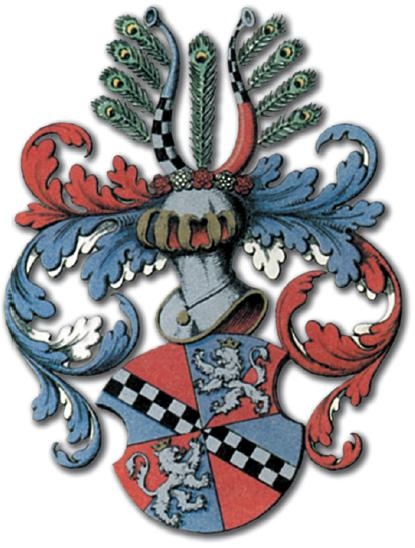
Coat of arms of the Danish noble family Rosenkrantz (Danmarks Adels Aarbog, 1906)

The standard arms of Rosenkrantz are party per bend gules and azure, a bend checky argent and sable. Above the helm and the wreath of roses, there is a peacock feather between two buffalo horns having four ditto feathers each. The horns are divided into silver and pattern, and pattern and red, respectively. The oldest known illustration of the standard arms is found in the Gelre Armorial of the 14th century.

Modern drawing after the 18th century Roll of arms

== See also ==
- Gøye family
