= Anders Mowatt of Hugoland =

Scottish merchant

Andrew Mowat of Hugoland
- Born: c.1530 Balquholly (by Turriff), Banffshire, Scotland
- Died: c.1610 Hovland, Tysnes, Hordaland, Norway
- Allegiance: Kingdom of Scotland; Denmark–Norway
- Branch: Royal Scots Navy (Denmark) Royal Dano-Norwegian Navy
- Rank: Admiral
- Spouses: Ursula Tollach and Else Tronds Rustung
- Children: John, Gilbert, Patrick, James Malcolm, Axel, Christoffer, Karen

Anders Mowat of Hugoland (also Andrew Mowat) (c. 1530 – c. 1610) was a Scottish merchant who became known as the "Lord of Hugoland" in Shetland. He served as an admiral in the Royal Danish-Norwegian Navy under King Christian IV of Denmark-Norway. He became a property owner in Sunnhordland now Hordaland, Norway.

== Biography ==
Mowat's parentage is unclear. Most genealogical historians believe that Mowat's parents were Barbara Saint Clair and Bartholomew Mowat; there is no documentation to support this, however. Mowat's father may have been Macolm Mowat, although there is no documentation to support or dispute this claim either. A document has been reported to exist, allegedly written during the year 1572, stating that the "Lord of Hugoland" was the second son of an unknown Mowatt of Swinie (Swinzie) from Caithness, but unfortunately, the first name of his father is not visible. However, an assertion exists on the social network aggregator website, Spokeo, that Mowat is a "descendant of the Mowats of Mont Hout, as described by his families ancestral Coat of Arms at Northhouse." The Spokeo web page proposes two women as possible aunts-Agnes Mowat, who married Bartholomew Strang of Voisgarth, and Barbara Mowat, the wife of Thomas Leask of Auchmad).

== Historical document ==
The first mention of Andrew Mowat in any known sources is from 1558. He was married to Ursula Tulloch, the daughter of William Tulloch of Skea in Northmavine and thus became an important figure in local affairs.

Mowat was an estate owner in Shetland, and mentioned as the lord of Hugoland. Since no Mowats are found in earlier Shetland sources, Mowat probably came from the mainland of Scotland in the early 1550s, and was one of the first Mowats to settle in Shetland.

In addition to his landed estates in Shetland, which he transferred to his three eldest sons in 1577, Andrew Mowat was also a businessman, owning a number of merchant ships and doing trade with Norway and England.

An "Andrew Mowat" is mentioned in a precept of sasine contained in a charter granted by Francis Bothwell, treasurer of Orkney, and Vicar of Unst, in favour of Barthol Strang of Voesgarth, on 12 November 1572.

== Fru Inger of Austrått ==
Inger Ottesdotter Rømer (c. 1475–1555) was a wealthy landowner and important figure in Norwegian aristocracy. Inger held Austrått and claimed the Giske estates as well as some of the Meløy estates in Norway. In addition, she held the Papa and Papaquids estates in Shetland. Inger was widowed in 1523 and as did not live in Shetland, she appointed Ursula Tulloch's father William Tulloch to manage the estates for her. Around 1543, William Tulloch acquired the lease of "Papa & Papaquids" from Fru Inger.

On William Tulloch's death, prior to 1558, his daughter Ursula was his heiress; there seems to be an agreement that the lease would pass to her and her husband Andrew Mowat of Hugoland. Andrew was appointed "tutor" to Ursula's brother, John Tulloch, in 1558, which indicates John was too young to take on the lease.

After the death of Fru Inger of Austrått in 1555, Robert Cheyne came to an agreement with the Norwegian proprietor over the "Papa Property." He ejected Andrew and Ursula from the island and overturned their right to assume control of the income produced by Papa and Papaquids. The evidence for this come from letters written by Mary, Queen of Scots herself, to one Jens Split as the chief proprietor and the Norwegian authorities on behalf of Andrew and Ursula in September 1566. These papers refer to Andrew and Ursula's rights of possession.

Queen Mary's letter had the desired effect, as it confirmed Andrew and Ursula's right to the lands of Papa and Papaquids. The confirmations were granted at different times between 1570 and 1576 by all the different proprietors. These arrangements were then confirmed in the Scottish courts. The Mowatts were also given the Great Seal of the Realm insuring their firm legal right to the lands of Papa and Papaquids.

One of the privileges granted to Andrew Mowatt in 1577 was a right to build a house and fortress on Papa. Mowatt descendants at some time did build a residence there called 'Northhouse,' with the Mowat coat of arms visible on the gateway entrance. However, Andrew and Ursula Mowatt did not take residence there themselves, living instead in Ollaberry on Northmavine.

== The Great Seal ==
In the Register of the Great Seal, on 27 March 1577, there is a confirmation by King James VI of a charter granted by Anders Mowatt in favour of John his eldest son, who stood to inherit 207- 3/8 merks land in Delting, 34½½ in Aithsting, 3 in Walls, 8 in Tingwall, 35 in Yell, and 18 in Unst. If he did not inherit, failing then to Malcolm, second son of the granter, whom failing Patrick, third son, reserving always his own life rent and a life rent on half of the said lands to Ursula Tulloch, his spouse. The charter of confirmation also permits Andrew and John to construct a fortress of stone to defend against possible invaders.

== Family with Ursula ==
This document, dated 1577, only names three of Andrew and Ursula's known five sons. The implication is that Malcolm and Patrick were either minors at the time the document was drawn up or they were born after the document was drawn up.

=== Andrew and Ursula's five known children ===
1. John Mowat of Ollaberry, later of Hugoland (born circa. 1564)
2. Gilbert Mowat of Garth, Minister of Delting (born circa. 1565)
3. Patrick Mowat (born circa 1567)
4. Malcolm Mowat (born after 1577)
5. James Mowat of Ure & Burrafirth (born after 1577)

=== Other possible children of Andrew and Ursula ===
6. Barbara Mowat (married Edward Sinclair of Scalloway)
7. Catherine Mowat, married John Neven of Scousburgh, and was probably mother to his son Ninian. She died after 1610.

== Marriage to Else Rustung and becoming Admiral in the King's Navy ==
Andrew's first wife Ursula died sometime between 1580 and 1586; in 1586 he applied to King James VI of Scotland for permission to travel to Bergen, Norway to marry. In June 1587, Andrew received permission to move to Bergen and find a suitable wife. It's possible that James VI hoped to place one of his own middle-ranked gentlemen into foreign society, that he might prove useful to the House of Stuart at a later date.

Once in Bergen, Andrew married the twice widowed Else Christoffersdatter Rustung, daughter of the Admiral of the Danish-Norwegian Navy Christoffer Trondsson Rustung, a.k.a. Kristoffer Throndsen. Else Rustung had been married previously to Jon Haard of Gjersvik and Axel Fredriksen, and was a landowner herself, holding lands in Sunnhordland. Andrew Mowat thereafter served as an admiral in Christian IV's service in the North Sea until his death around 1610, returning to his native Shetland on numerous occasions. Many of Andrew's and Else's sons and grandchildren becoming senior naval officers. Andrew became an important landowner in Norway centering on Hovland on the island of Tysnesøya. He owned several other farms in Sunnmøre, while still holding his lands in Shetland. He was also a ship-owner, owning several ships he had captained, and a trader of imports in Norway, Scotland and England.

== Family with Else ==
1. Axel Mowat (1592–1661), Admiral in the Royal Danish Navy. He was the father of Karen Mowat (c. 1630–1675) heiress and owner of the estate Barony Rosendal.
2. Christoffer Mowat, Vice-Admiral in the Royal Danish Navy (died without issue)
3. Karen Mowat, married Admiral Erik Ottesen Orning
4. daughter not named in any sources, possibly named Kirstine.

== Chronology ==
- June 1587 Andrew gets permission to travel to Norway and find a wife
- Andrew serves in the Royal Danish Navy from circa 1587 until his death in circa 1610
- Circa 1587 Andrew and Else are married.
- 1591 Letters are written by the King of Denmark on behalf of Andrew Mowat to Elizabeth I, regarding pirate attacks on Andrew's ships and his home in Ollaberry.
- June 1591 Anders Mowat of Hovland signs as member of the Norwegian nobility the acclaim of Christian IV as king of Norway.
- Mortgage or deed of pawn papers are signed on 20 June 1597, by both Anders and Else Mowat as the landowners.
- Andrew is documented as sitting on the supreme court in Oslo as said Judge in 1599.
- From 1602 to 1604 records show Anders and Else lived in Shetland.
- On 16 April 1606 at Hovland in Hordaland. Anders and Else took over part of the farm.
- 1610/11 Andrew Mowat dies.
- By 1613 Else had taken over the rest of the estate in Hovland and the Mowat family owned the entire seat by the 1630s.

== Documentation of Andrew's life ==
There are documents extant today which provide clues about Andrew Mowat's life. One such is the Mortgage or deed of pawn papers signed on 20 June 1597, by both Anders and Else Mowat as the landowners.

The granters of the deed are Andrew Mouat of Hugoland (" Houckeland ") in Shetland, and his spouse Else Trondsdatter, who is declared to be owner of the lands in her own right. She is designed as " of Erisfiordt " or Erisfirth in Norway, and it is signed at Gieresvig in that country on 20 June 1597. Mortgage, or Deed of Pawn, of Land in Shetland, 1597

=== Original text ===
Jeg Anders Maath til Houckeland i Hietlandt oc min kiere hustru Eriig oc welbyrdig fru Else Trondsdaatter tiill Erisfiordt Beplichter os med waare sande arfifuinger for alle medt dette wort obne Breff, At wi aff ret witterligh gieldt skyldiigh ere Erligh och Welforstandiig mandt Effuart Sincklar boenndis wdi Hietlandt paa Bollesetter summa tre hundrede Rigs Dalir, huilckie forbemelte penningie envert os aff sin venliig laan laant haffuer, for huilckie summa pendingie, nemlicht tre'` Rigs Dalir wi med waaris fri wilie oc welberaadt hugh, sampt med allis waaris sande arffuingers widskap wilie och samtockie, Haffuir pandset forbemelte Effuart Sincklar, bans arffuinger oe effterkommere dette effterschreffne gods som er min kiere hustruis rette Odal, Liggendis wdj Hietlandt, forst wdi Wissdals sogn y Offreboster, tolff march brende, huer march otte pendingie, I Skarpegierdt otte march brende, huer march sex pendingie, noch Degrand i Wisdals sogn sex march brende huer march otte pendingie, noch i Daletings sogn i fornemde Hietland paa ein gaard heder Kirckehuusz tre marche brende, huer marche sex pendingie, Dette forschreffne gods alt samen skall forbemelte

Effiuut Sincklar cller f()il)emelte bans arffuingcr liaffuc, nyde, bruge oc bebolde tiill ein secber oc tryg wndcrpant oc brugclig ciedom, med bucs der tiil aff arilds tiid liggit baffucr, fraa bdgistc fields tinne oc yderste fiene stein, med lottum oc lundom, inlil wndcrtagendis wdi naagen maade, indtil forbenicttc Effuart Sincklar ellcr bans aiffuinger igien faar oc bekommcr sin fyllist betaling meeste oc minsta aff os eller waare sande arffuinger, oc naar /vi dette gods igien loszir, skall detb skie i tre terminer, den forste skall angaa om S. Hanszis tid, den anden om sancte Oluff der strax efftcr, oc denn tredie skal om sancte Hansz det aar der nest effterkommendis oc naar forscbreffne summa pendingie fornoiet oeb betalit er, som faaresiiger, daa skal forscbreffne gods folgie OSS igien som tilforne : Ocb dess till sandingenn ber om, Att dette forscbreffne saaledis fast ocb vvryggeligenn boldis skall udj ordt punncbter oc artickler, daa baffuer ieg fornemdbe Andres Maat med min kiere bustru trycbt waare signeter vnder dette wort obne breff oc wndcrscbriffue medt egen bandt, ocb till ydermere /idnisl)yrd ber om, daa baffuer wi wenligen ombedit wellerdt mandt ber Rasmus Jocnsonn sogneprest ber samme steds med oss at beseglc oc stadfestc,

Actum Gierisuig denn 20 Junij Anno 1597.

Mowat off Houcbeland
Else trunsdaatter

Her Rasmus Jonsonn minister

=== Translation ===
I, Anders Mouat/Mowat of Houckeland (Hugoland) in Hietlandt (Shetland) and my dear spouse the worthy and honourable lady Else Trondsdatter of Erisfiordt, with our true heirs, acknowledge before all, by this our open letter, that we are justly and truly indebted to the honourable and discreet man Effuart Sincklar (Edward Sinclair), residing in Hietlandt (Shetland) at Bollesetter, the sum of three hundred Ri/ dollars, which money foresaid he has made over to us in friendly loan, for which sum of money, namely three hundred Rix dollars, we, of our free will and well advised ])urp<)se, with the knowledge, will, and consent of all our true heirs, have pawned to the foresaid Edward Sinclair, his heirs and successors, the after described land, which is my dear spouse's just Odal inheritance, lying in Hietlandt, first in Wissdale

[In Weisdale] parish in Offreboster, twelve marks burnt [silver] eight pennies the mark, in Skarpegerdt eight marks burnt [silver] six pennies the mark, also Degrand in Weisdale parish six marks burnt [silver] eight pennies the mark, also in Daleting [Delting] parish in the before named Hiedandt, a farm called Kirkhouse, three marks burnt [silver] six pennies the mark. These whole before named lands the before named Edward Sinclair or his heirs shall have, enjoy, use and possess in sure and certain pawn and usable possession, with everything" that has belonged to them from time immemorial, from the highest summit of the hill to the lowest stone of the foreshore, with the parts and pertinents, nothing in any way excepted, until the before named Edward Sinclair or his heirs again receive and acknowledge the full payment, the most and the least, from us or our true heirs, and when we again redeem these lands it shall be done at three terms, the first at St John's day, the second at St Olaf's immediately thereafter, and the third at St John's day next after following, and when the foresaid sum of money is fully paid as aforesaid, then the before named lands shall belong to us again as before. And for the verity hereof, that this [contract] before written shall be held sure and unchallengeable in all its words, points, and articles, I the before named Anders Mouat/Mowat with my dear spouse have affixed our seals to this our open letter and subscribed [the same] with our own hands; and for further testimony hereof we have cordially requested the learned man Rasmus Joensonn, parish priest in this place, along with us to seal and confirm.
Done at Gierisuig the 20 June 1597.

Seal.) (Seal.) (Seal.)

A. Mowat of Houcheland
Else Transdatter
with [our] own hand

Her Rasmus Jonsonn minister
with my own hand.

=== Description of document ===
The deed is written on a folio sheet of strong handmade paper, and is in an excellent state of preservation. The writing is in an ordinary Norwegian hand of the period, and any difficulties in its style have been cleared up by the scholar, Mr. Kristian Koren, of Trondhjem.

This document is a Mortgage, or more strictly a deed of pawn, equivalent to the old Scottish instrument of Vadset, of certain properties in Shetland. By this instrument, subjects enumerated in the document were not merely mortgaged in security, but were made over in real and corporal possession to the lender, only to be returned by him on payment of the borrowed money.

The granters of the deed are Andrew Mowat/Mouat of Hugoland in Shetland, and his spouse Else Trondsdatter, who is declared to be owner of the lands in her own right. 20 June 1597.

== Letter to Elizabeth I ==
On 12 August 1586, Andrew Mowat's home in Shetland was robbed in cash and goods by Captain of the pirates William Beare and the crew of the "Black Lyon". Other Shetlanders and ships were being robbed and plundered along the Scotland and Shetland coastline. Andrew as well as others wrote letter directly to Queen Elizabeth advising her of this. Andrew Mowat was again targeted in upon his return to Shetland in 1590 in a second raid where he once more lost money and goods. Mowat again wrote directly to the queen. The queen answered by saying that Captain Beare was dead and without the name of the pirate in the second raid there was nothing she could do.

However, Andrew Mowat had a great deal of social credit in two other European Courts. Andrew was a joint subject of King James VI of Scotland and King Christian IV of Denmark-Norway. James writ to his new brother-in-law Christian about the Mowat case proposing that the goods of Englishmen in Denmark be laid under embargo until the restitution was forthcoming. Christian himself wrote a letter on behalf of Andrew and sent it to Elizabeth. Furthermore, Mowat himself was serving in the Danish Navy so could quite easily enforce this decision.

A letter written by the Christian IV of Denmark on behalf of Andrew Mowat to Elizabeth I of England regarding pirate attacks on Andrew's ships and his home in Ollaberry.

"It pleasethe your heighnes to understand that I, Andres Motte, esqueyer, retayner, and subjecte under the Kynges majestie of Denmarcke, and, for carten causes which God hathe appoynted, dwellinge at this present in his majestie realme of Norway, which am of layte yeres come oute of Shottland, in which place my landes, goodes, and inheritance doth lye and remayn which God hath geyven me to enierett of my progeniteis, gevinge your most excelent heighnes my greatte sorowe and heavei complaynt to understande that I have benne two seaverall tymes spoyled and robede with Inglysh men dwelling within your majestie realme of Ingland, unto my greate heyndrance and lose of manie houndrthe dolleris.

Fyrste, in anno −86 the 12 in Auguste am I robede and spoyled in my dwellinge house called Olleberie in Shottlande bye Inglishe men, the capten beinge named Capten Beare dwellinge in Ratclyf beseides your majestie citey of London, or havinge his abbydinge in the same place. Which capten hade a shipe called the "Blacke Leyon" of Hull, master tharof called Ellexsander Chapman, dwellinge in Hull, havinge with them an other small barke to thare pennes and haveinge in both shipes a greate nomber of men. At which tyme they have not only spoyled my house, but allso have tacken from me in goulde and money and seylver warcke and other goodes the some of two thowsande doleris, beseides my apparell and obligacones and deades which I woulde not meyse for syxe houndrethe doleris.

And now agayn in anno '90 I had occasion for to sayll from Norwaye to Shottlande, and from thense to my soffrayne lord and prence the Kynges majeste of Skottlande upon sarten matteris I hade for to declare unto his highnes. And beinge come nere to the lande of Shottlande thare came an Ingleshe man of ware upon me and robede me of all that I hade in my shipe, and tocke from me at that present tyme in goulde, selver, and goodes, the some of foure thowsande and fyve houndrethe dolleris, besydes a wryteynge which my souffraune lord Kynge Jemes his majestie be fore hade geyven unto me with sarten other obleygacones and billes aperteyning to my sealf, the which I woulde not meise for a thowsande doleris. Upon vhich saide rover was a roppares sonne of Skarbroughe in Yorckshyar as nere as I can larnne by my shiper and marineris, which saide ropperes sonne hathe a marke in one of his checkes cout with a sorde,
And beinge so spoyled and robed two seaveralle times with our majestie subjectes, and havinge by them had suche a greatte lose upon my goodes and monye, it hathe cawsed me to macke my humble sutt and complaint unto my souffrainte lord, the Kinges majestie of Danmarke, whoo hathe of his majestie heighenes wryten his lovinge letteres unto your souffrainte majestie in my behalf.
And for that I do understand that my souffrainte lord and Kynnge his majestie wrytethe not so large instrouccones unto your highnes of theise persones as I my self with dyveres otheres can showe and testefye, it mackethe me the boulder to present this my humble suppleicacon unto your majestie, moste humble besechinge your heighnes not onlye to geyve me pardon for this my boulde enterprice, but also of your gracious goodnes for my souffraynt lorde and Kynge his majesties sacke to be a healpe unto me, whareby I may come unto my ownne agaynne of theise forsaid parsones which have so crewellye meisowsed me, or other wayes to have lawe and justes agaynst them in suche order as it shall seme beaste unto your majesties heignes. Wrten upon my hows called Gereis Weycke in Norway."

Undertegnet "Mowat of Howgland"........"

== Death ==
Andrew Mowat died between 1610/11 at Tysnesøya in Hordaland, Norway. His wife, Else Rustung is thought to have died between 1625 and 1631; sources are contradictory.

== Bibliography ==
- Crawford, Barbara Elizabeth; Beverly Ballin Smith (1999) The Biggings, Papa Stour, Shetland: the history and excavation of a royal Norwegian farm (Society Antiquaries Scotland) ISBN 9780903903158
- Goudie, Gilbert (1904) The Celtic and Scandinavian antiquities of Shetland (Edinburgh, London : W. Blackwood and sons)
- Grant, Francis J. (1893) County Families of Shetland Islands
- Mackillop, Andrew; Steve Murdoch (2003) Military governors and imperial frontiers c. 1600–1800: a study of Scotland (Brill Academic Pub) ISBN 978-9004129702
- Murdoch, Steve (2010) The Terror of the Seas?: Scottish Maritime Warfare, 1513–1713 (BRILL) ISBN 978-9004185685
- Sunde, Jørn Øyrehagen (2009) From a Shetland Lairdship to a Norwegian Barony: The Mouat Family and the Barony of Rosendal (Shetland Heritage Publications) ISBN 978-0955764233

== Related reading ==
- Owe, Christoffer (1998). "Anders Mowat og hans slekt". Norsk Slektshistorisk Tidsskrift. 3. XXXVI. Oslo.
