= Anna Throndsen =

Dano-Norwegian noblewoman

Anna Tronds (c. 1539–1607) or Anna Kristoffersdatter, known in English as Anna Throndsen and posthumously as Anna Rustung, was a Dano-Norwegian noblewoman, daughter of admiral Kristoffer Throndsen, a Danish-Norwegian admiral of Norwegian origin. In English and Scots history, Anna Throndsen is best known for her engagement to James Hepburn, 4th Earl of Bothwell (which later earned her the nickname Skottefruen ("The Scottish Lady")), a man who later married Mary, Queen of Scots. Anna Throndsen is also known for her possible but much debated and disputed involvement in drafting some of the famous Casket Letters; from early 1567. These letters being the principal evidence against Mary. The probability that she was involved in the production of these letters is, however, minimal, as Anna, at least since 1565, was resident in her home country, Norway.

== Background ==
Anna seems to have been the oldest daughter of Kristoffer Throndsen, a famous 16th-century Norwegian admiral, nobleman and wartime privateer (pirate). During the final years of independent Norway, 1532–1537, Kristoffer served as admiral of the Norwegian fleet, in the service of Olav Engelbrektsson, the last Catholic archbishop of Norway. The nature of the relation between the two is debated. The most likely hypothesis that has been put forward is that their wives, who were both of the Skanche family, were related.

Some years after Norway's political subsumption by Denmark, in 1542-43, Kristoffer was appointed to serve King Christian III as a Naval commander. He served as an admiral in the Danish-Norwegian fleet, then as Danish Royal Consul in Copenhagen. Kristoffer took his Norwegian family, including Anna, to Copenhagen at this time. As a young woman, Anna assisted her father in consular affairs in the Danish-Norwegian capital.

One of Anna's six sisters, Else, married a Shetland man - Andrew Mowat of Hugoland - in Eshaness. They lived in Norway and had a son Axel Mowat. Axel's descendants established the Barony Rosendal in Kvinherrad, Norway. Else owned a small property in Shetland, mentioned in a 1597 document written in Norn.

== Engagement to James Hepburn, Earl of Bothwell ==
Anna was engaged to Bothwell while he was doing business in Denmark, ca. 1560. The engagement was considered legitimate under Dano-Norwegian law, but was, and is still, treated as dubious or invalid by English and Scots historians. For this reason, most English books refer to her as a "mistress" or jilted lover. Anna's later Bergen lawsuit against Bothwell (1567), which held him to account for wrongful behaviour as a husband, as well as writings of the Scots Earl of Moray, lend credence to the fact that a kind of legal commitment did transpire. Norwegian historian Ludvig Ludvigsen Daae concluded in 1872 that they were engaged, but not fully married. A travel document issued to Anna ca. 1563, strongly indicates that Anna stayed in Scotland for a period in the first half of the 1560s. It has later been rumoured that during her stay Anna gave birth to Bothwell's only known child, William, the only son of Bothwell. This, however, is very unlikely as it was not brought up in the trial in Bergen in 1567. In 1565, she was twice mentioned as being present in Norway, where her mother and sisters had settled after their father's death ca. 1564.

In 1566, Bothwell married another woman, Lady Jean Gordon, but soon set his eyes on the Queen, Mary Stuart. Shortly thereafter, Bothwell proceeded to marry Mary Stuart, Queen of Scots, after having allegedly murdered her husband, Henry Stuart, Lord Darnley.

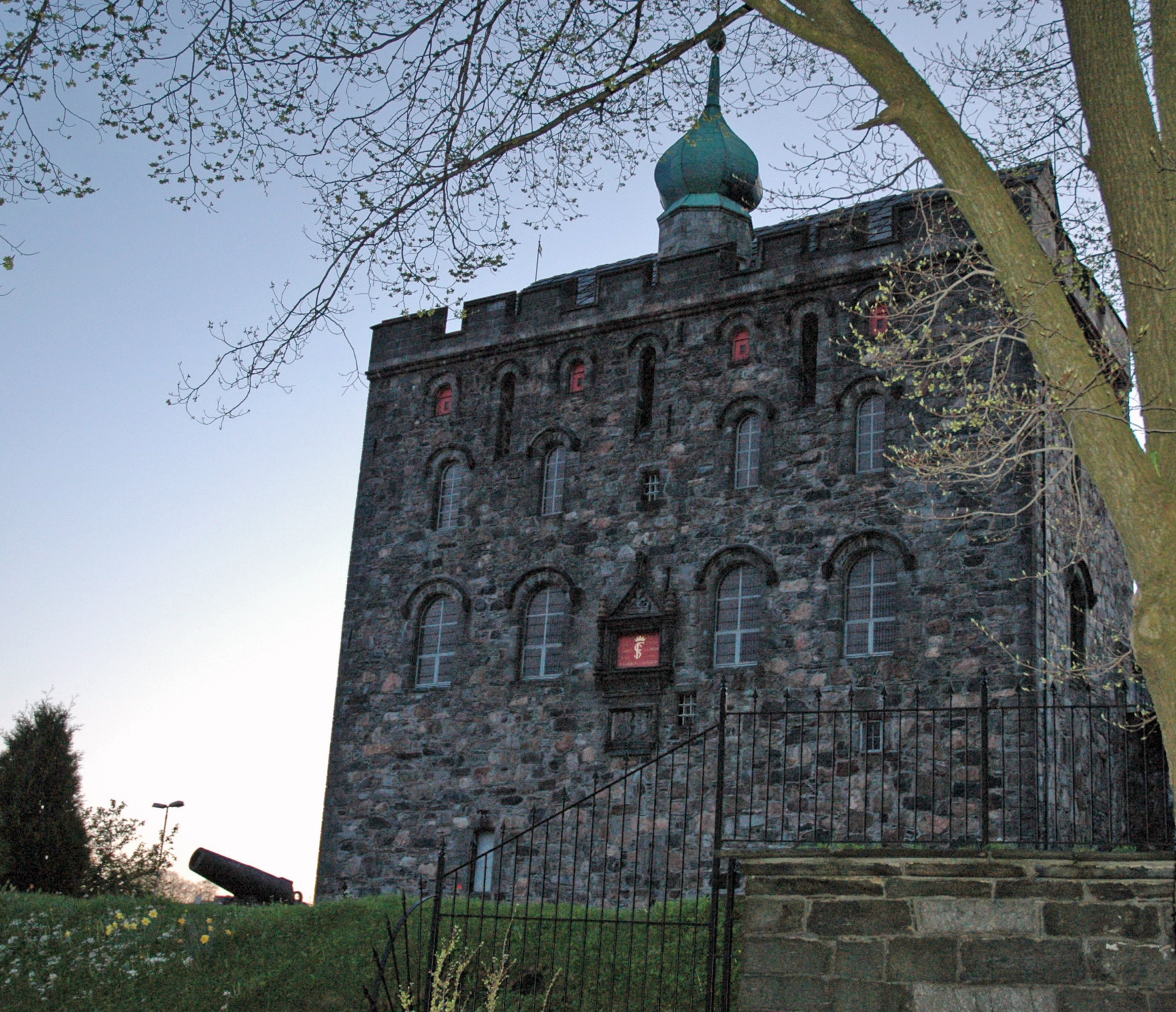
The Rosenkrantz Tower in Bergen, where James Hepburn, Earl of Bothwell, was imprisoned, during his court case with Anna, his former wife

Bothwell met his demise through a chance reunion with Anna in Bergen, Norway in 1567. He had left Scotland, fleeing the authorities seeking him on murder charges related to the death of Darnley. He was detained in the port of Bergen, Norway for lack of proper exit papers. Anna was now living in the vicinity of Bergen, most probably at the Ænes-farm in Kvinherrad, where she had family connections. Bothwell's administrative detainment turned to imprisonment in Rosenkrantz Tower on the order of the Danish commander of Bergenhus Castle, Erik Rosenkratz, on the basis of Anna's legal complaint against him for his use of her as his wife, and demand for restitution of her sizable dowry. A court case ensued, whereby she gave testimony that he had "three wives alive" including herself.

Bothwell settled with Anna out of court, offering her as restitution one of his ships and promising her an additional annuity which he never was able to pay, as he never regained his freedom. The King of Denmark-Norway, Frederick II had taken notice of him as a political pawn. Elizabeth I was calling for Bothwell's extradition back to Scotland to stand trial for the murder of Darnley, Elizabeth's cousin. Rather than turn him over to England, Fredrik II transferred Bothwell to Dragsholm Castle where he died after many years.

== Possible involvement with the Casket Letters ==
Anna Throndsen has been connected with a set of correspondence called the Casket Letters. These letters were found in the belongings of a servant of Bothwell, after his flight from Scotland. These letters were used by Mary's half-brother Regent Moray to demonstrate her involvement in the murder of her husband, Lord Darnley. The letters include sonnets and poetry. Some of this material is supposed to have been written by Anna, an idea first suggested by the novelist Robert Gore Browne in his 1937 study of Bothwell. Most British historians contest this, alleging that someone of Nordic nobility would not have had sufficient knowledge of French to draft such prose and there is no reason to connect Throndsen with the Scottish court of Mary or her enemies. Handwriting analysis has also led to dismissal of this speculation. Handwriting analysis may not take into consideration the international background of the family, which regularly moved throughout Europe during her childhood, and being nobility would have spoken fluent French, or that the letters exist mostly as copies.

== Skottefruen ==
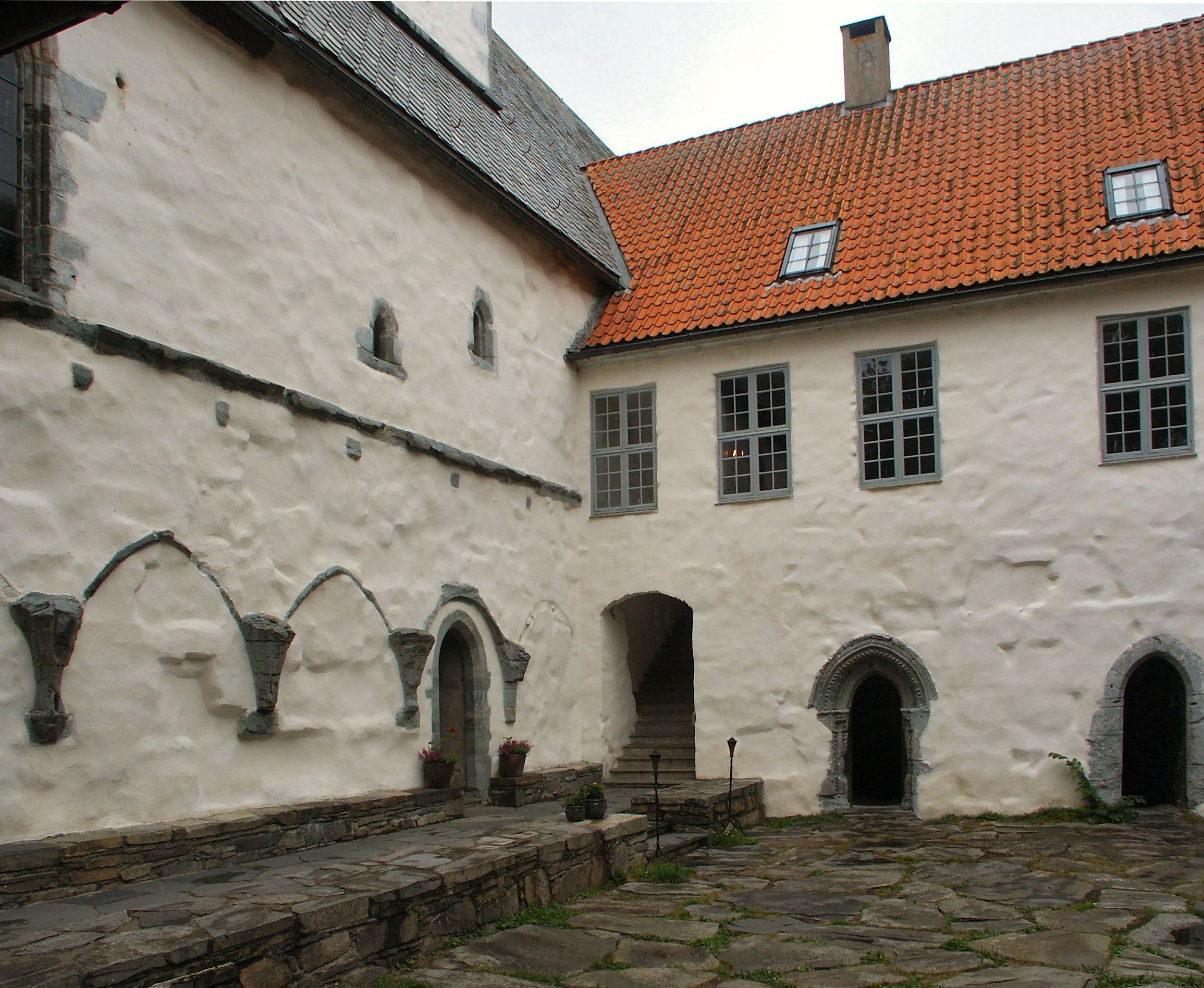
Utstein Abbey where Anna spent the last days of her life.

Anna Throndsen is known in modern Norway as Skottefruen, "the Scotsman's madam". This was a name attributed to Anna during her lifetime, after her return from Scotland and setteling in the Bergen area in western Norway, where her family had several residences.

She never remarried. She was, however, socially active and prominent in local events and social affairs, such as is recorded in various historical diaries from the period. Evidently she was wealthy in her own right, due to some good investments of her inheritance. She is said to have spent her last days in Utstein Abbey, a converted former-convent outside of Stavanger. It is understood that she became a nun late in life; if so, this would have been indicative of her family's Catholic background. Her mother seems to have been a relative of the wife of the last Norwegian archbishop, Olav Engelbrektsson. However, this is rather unlikely. A more credible legend from Kvinherrad says that she was buried in Kvinnherad Church and that her father Kristoffer Trondsson is also buried there.

Several historical novels have been written about her as Skottefruen, in the Norwegian language; these used temporal journals and diaries as reference.
