= Johannes Lauritsson =

Norwegian landowner

Johannes Lauritsson (c. 1540 – c. 1620) was a wealthy Norwegian landowner. Through marriage, he was associated with the prominent Galte family of Jondal in Hardanger.

== Plot and arrest ==
He is mentioned as living at Valen (Valo) in the parish of Fjelberg (now part of Kvinnherad Municipality) from 1563 to 1578. Around 1567, during the Northern Seven Years' War (1563-1570), Lauritsson joined the adventurer Enno Brandrøk in Sweden in his scheme to aggravate King Frederick II of Denmark-Norway. Lauritsson was after some time sent back to Norway with a letter for the nobility, describing great hostilities and suggesting they should kill as many Danes as possible. Due to this, Lauritsson was captured and sentenced to be executed. However he was set free after paying 100 daler. This was probably due to Enno's sister Anna Tronds.

== Later life ==
Lauritsson is not mentioned again after his return from Sweden until 1578, when he was trustee for his mother in the case against the brothers Sebjørn and Tore Toresson. At this time he still lived at the farm Valen. He was married around 1583–85 to Herborg Torbjørnsdatter Sandven (c. 1565–1633) of Sandven in Kvam. Through this marriage, he received Jondal farm in Hardanger, one of the two farms at Torsnes which she in turn had inherited from her grandfather or great-grandfather Peter Nilsson på Torsnes (c.1450-1530). Lauritsson also inherited land from Guttorm Nilsson. By 1603 he was, together with his wife's brother Olav Torbjørnson Sandven (1560-1637), one of the wealthiest landowners in Hardanger and Sunnhordland. Lauritsson was juror in 1590, 1599 and 1610. In 1591, he was the representative from the parish of Strandebarm at the celebration at Oslo for King Christian IV of Denmark-Norway.
