= Enno Brandrøk =

Norwegian noble

Enno "Brandrøk" Tronds (c. 1538–1571) was a nobleman, mercenary and adventurer, son of Norwegian-born privateer and admiral Kristoffer Trondson (Rustung). The origin of his nickname "Brandrøk" (brand = fire, røk = smoke) is uncertain, but may have originated from his mercenary career.

== Biography ==
=== Early years ===
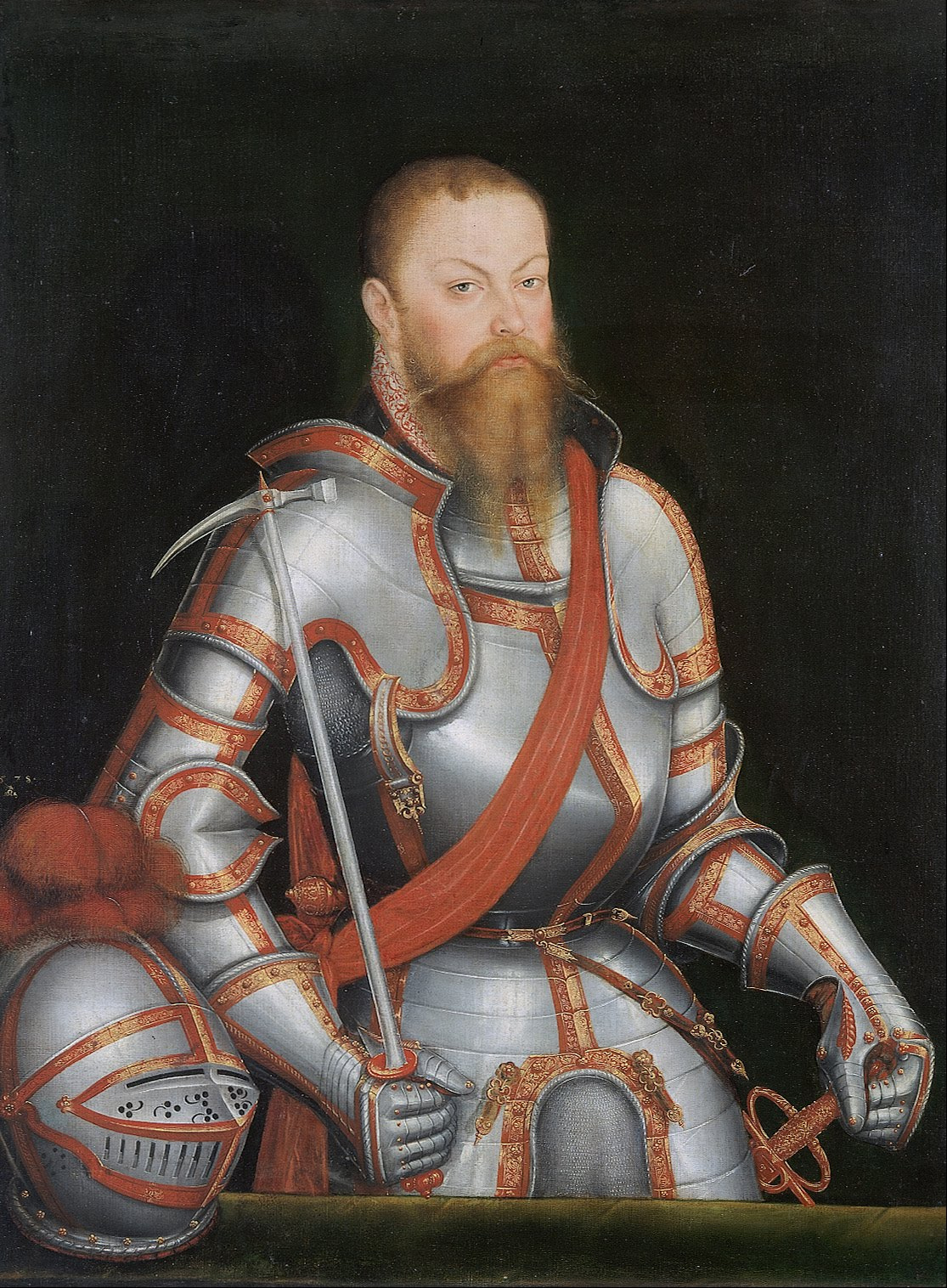
Maurice, Elector of Saxony who was responsible for training Enno in his youth.

Born in East Frisia, in present-day Germany, Enno was named after Count Enno II, whom his father was serving under at the time. In 1542 when he was about 4 years old he and his family probably moved to Denmark where they lived at Æbelholt Abbey.

When he was about 12 years old, in 1550, he was placed at Maurice, Elector of Saxony to be fully trained as a nobleman, and already as a 15-year-old he participated in Maurice' service in the Battle of Sievershausen. Enno was during this battle captured and put in prison for a year, and his mentor Maurice was killed. When he was set free from prison he travelled to Hungary where he joined the Habsburg in the wars against the Turks.

=== Mercenary career ===
After his family had been ennobled in 1557 he went overseas as a Landsknecht. He served in the Spanish Armada at the Battle of St. Quentin during the war between Philip II of Spain and Henry II of France.

He, as well as his father Kristoffer, was also present in the military campaign towards Dithmarschen. They both were also present at the coronation of Frederick II of Denmark-Norway. Not long after Enno again travelled abroad and fought wars, still as a Landsknecht, in England and Scotland. Later he came back to Denmark-Norway and served Frederick II during the Northern Seven Years' War. His father also fought in this war as an Admiral of the Royal Dano-Norwegian Navy.

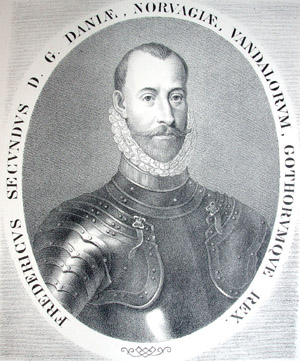
Frederick II of Denmark-Norway who refused to acknowledge Enno, based on his untrustworthiness.

When the war was over he travelled to Copenhagen, complaining about his position. He requested the Danish-Norwegian king Frederick II to be promoted, as his father had been. But as the king lacked trust in Enno, probably knowing that he was untrustworthy and only served for money and adventure, he would not give him what he asked. After the rejection Enno was greatly upset, complaining that the king had exploited him and his family.

=== Retreat to Sweden ===
When his father died in 1565 the rest of his family moved back to Norway, however Enno would still stay in Denmark. Now Enno expected to get some of the titles after his father, however Frederick II still refused to promote him. Enno was so upset that he travelled back to his family in Western Norway, and in 1567 he decided to travel to Sweden where he offered his services to the king Eric XIV who greeted Enno with open arms.

Enno tried to give the king the impression that Norwegians were so displeased with the Danish rule that they would rather be willing to succumb to Sweden. To add to his credibility he had also made his cousin Johannes Lauritsson, of the noble Galte family, join him. After some time he sent his cousin back to Norway with a letter for the nobility, describing great hostilities and even saying they should kill as many Danes as possible. Many noblemen who had received Enno's letter went to the lord of Bergenhus, Erik Rosenkrantz, trying to claim their innocence.

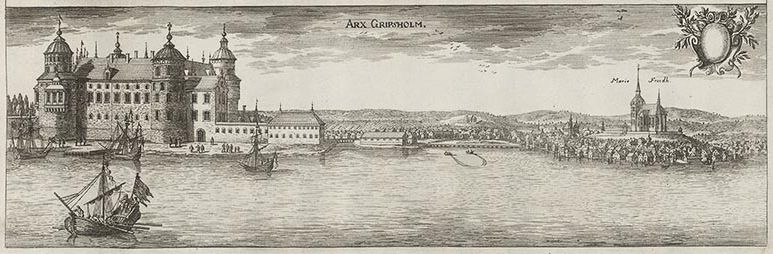
Gripsholm Castle where Enno robbed a great fortune.

Johannes Lauritsson who had brought the letter to Norway was captured and set to be executed. However he was set free after paying 100 daler. This was probably thanks to Enno's sister Anna Tronds and Enno's cousin Erik Rosenkrantz. Eventually the Swedish king Eric XIV understood that what Enno had claimed were merely lies and wild fantasies, and his friendship with the Swedish king was now over. After one year in prison he joined the king's brothers John and Charles, however, in the autumn of 1569, he robbed a fortune of money, gold and gemstones from Charles treasury at Gripsholm Castle. After this, Charles had a search after Enno throughout all of Europe, were Enno lived a high life under a false title as Count.

=== Escape through Europe ===
His escape first brought Enno to Danzig, where he married the beautiful daughter of a merchant, and further through Germany and France, all the way to Nice. When he returned to Antwerp in 1571, he was finally arrested, but thanks to his charm and charlatan abilities, he could continue living a luxurious life in prison. During his confinement, Enno also made connections to several prominent persons, all the way up to the governor of Habsburg Netherlands: Fernando Álvarez de Toledo, Duke of Alba.

Some time later, the Swedes succeeded in establishing torture as a legal method of punishment, and with help of the prison warden he escaped from prison and lived more than half a year as a free man. During this time he committed three counts of manslaughter. These murders brought him into captivity of the Duke of Clevesborg Angermund at Düsseldorf, where he was put up for trial in January 1572. Immediately after the trial, Enno was tortured by breaking wheel and finally executed by decapitation.

== Family ==
Perhaps as a result of his turbulent life, he never had any children, even though he married Anne Marie de Wittersheim in his later years.

== Literature ==
- Daae, Ludvig (1872). Christopher Throndssønn Rustung, hans Søn Enno og hans Datter Skottefruen. HT. pp. 113–170, 343–344.
- Berntsen, T. (1926). Enno Brandrøk. Vol. 3 (1 ed.). Norsk biografisk leksikon.
