= Galtung (noble family) =

Norwegian noble family

- Uradel; Nobility
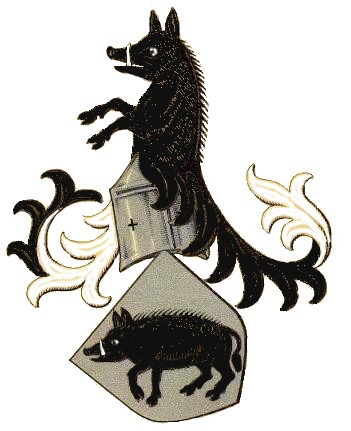
- Galtung coat of arms as drawn by Anders Thiset for Danmarks Adels Aarbog of 1916.
- Parent family: Galte family Torsnes family
- Country: Norway
- Place of origin: Hardanger
- Founded: 1648
- Founder: Lauritz Galtung

The Galtung family was a Norwegian noble family dating from the ennoblement of Lauritz Galtung in 1648. However, when he was ennobled, documents indicated the family descended from an older noble family, the Galte family. This led to both Hardanger families being referenced as Galtungs in history books.

A male-lineage connection between the two families has not been identified. A female-line bridging them was long proposed until that too was debunked in 1950, by professor Lars Hamre's discovery of the Torsnes' family lineage in Copenhagen archives. The lineage stated that the younger Galtungs were descendants of Sigurd Guttormsson at Torsnes, not Sigurd Gautsson Galte at Hatteberg as previously claimed.

== The old family, Galte ==
The first family, called Galte, belongs to what was called the uradel (i.e., undocumented as nobility by letters of patent, but widely recognized as nobility in other sources) in the Middle Ages. It is believed that the descendants living today represent the oldest surviving noble family in Norway, commonly known as clan Mel, Melsætten. The old Galte farm estates of Mel and Hatteberg were the core of the later Danish-Norwegian Barony of Rosendal.

== The younger family, Galtung ==
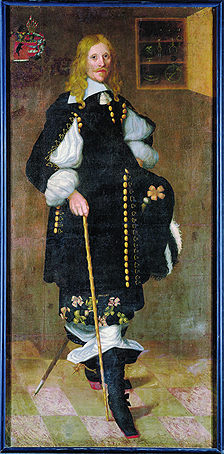
Admiral Lauritz Galtung (c. 1615–1661)

The younger Galtung family male-line can be traced back to Laurits Johanneson who was born around 1519. It was his great-grandson Lauritz Galtung, Admiral of the Dano-Norwegian fleet, who later renewed the nobility of the family in 1648, changing the name from Galte to Galtung. The present family belonged to an influential circle of families in the Hardanger area, including the owners of the farms Aga and Torsnes, and had many well-known naval officers, including admirals .

In 1885, historian Henrik Jørgen Huitfeldt-Kaas said that in the period 1670-1870 the family started marrying commoners, and thus, should be considered to have lost their nobility (later it was asserted that this position was influenced by the Danish, whose nobility, to a large degree, supplanted Norwegian nobility during the Dano-Norwegian union). Early in the 18th century the remaining family lived on the old family farm of Torsnes, which is still occupied by descendants today. By the end of the 18th century, many of the family's members could be found in the cities, populating professional classes as lawyers, doctors and such.

Living descendants today include sociologist Johan Galtung, recognised for his contributions to peace research and practice of conflict-solving, the so-called transcend-method. According to Statistics Norway 100 persons have Galtung as their surname as of 2009.

== Literature ==
- Galtung, Johan Ellertsen: Galtungslekten i fortid og nutid, Oslo 1997.
- Huitfeldt-Kaas, H.J.: De nulevende Adelsslægter i Norge, Christiania 1885.
- Huitfeldt-Kaas, Henrik Jørgen m.fl.: Norske Sigiller fra Middelalderen, Oslo 1899-1950 (seals no. 928, 946, 1089 og 1308)
- Steffens, Haagen Krog: Norske Slægter 1912, Gyldendalske Boghandel, Kristiania 1911
- C. M. Munthe: «Norske slegtsmerker» (Norwegian family emblems), Norsk slektshistorisk tidsskrift, Vol. I, Oslo 1928, pages 32 ff and 155 ff, especially page side 188 and the illustrations no. 189-192
- Haukanes, K. og Jon : Segl og bumerke frå Hardanger, Oslo 1944, pages 23, 101, 248, 281
- Cappelen, Hans: Norske slektsvåpen (Norwegian family coats of arms, with a summary in English), Oslo 1969 (new edition 1976) (with a modern heraldic bookplate in color and a new drawing of the shield in a modern style)
- Løvenskiold, Herman L.: Heraldisk nøkkel, Oslo 1978
- A. Thiset og P.L. Wittrup: Nyt dansk Adelslexikon, København 1904
- Achen, S. T.: Danske adelsvåbener, København 1973
