= Ludvig Rosenkrantz =

Danish-born noble, military officer, civil servant, and land owner

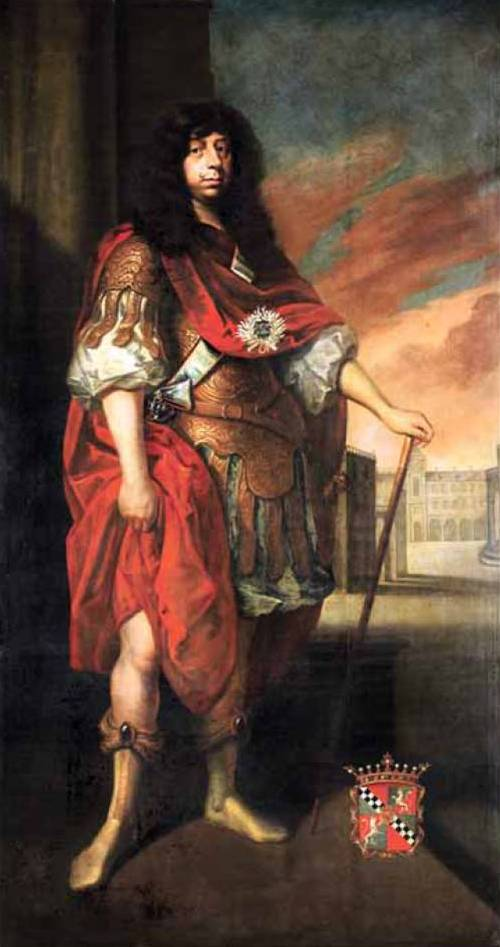
- Painting of Ludvig Holgersen Rosenkrantz
- Born: 18 April 1628; Odense, Denmark-Norway
- Died: 23 August 1685 (aged 57); Kristiansand, Denmark-Norway
- Occupations: Nobleman; Civil servant Land owner
- Spouse: Karen Mowat
- Children: Axel Rosenkrantz; Justine Cathrine Rosenkrantz
- Relatives: Axel Mowat (father-in-law)

Ludvig Rosenkrantz (18 April 1628 – 23 August 1685) was a Danish-born noble, military officer, civil servant, and land owner who settled in Norway. He was a member of the noble Rosenkrantz family and the first Baron of Norway.

== Biography ==
Ludvig Holgerssøn Rosenkrantz was born in Odense, Denmark. He was a member of one of the old families of nobility in Denmark. His parents were Colonel Holger Frederiksen Rosenkrantz (1599–1634) and Justine Maximiliansdatter van der Lauwick. As the son of nobility, Rosenkrantz received royal funding to travel abroad and educate himself to become an officer in the Norwegian army.

He became a captain in 1654 and in 1658 he was appointed by King Frederick III of Denmark to be war commander of Nordafjells. He served as General War Commissioner (Generalkrigskommisær) of Norway starting in 1673. He was also appointed a judge in Norway's highest court (Overhoffretten). He was decorated with the Order of Dannebrog in 1684.

In 1673, he was appointed County Governor of Stavanger Amt and he was based in the city of Stavanger. He was promoted in 1680 when he was appointed as the Diocesan Governor of Stavanger Stiftamt (the larger overarching diocese that included the subordinate Stavanger Amt county of which he was already the governor). He held both posts for a time. In 1683, the King moved his job to the town of Christianssand and renamed the job Diocesan Governor of Christianssand. He reluctantly moved to Christianssand, but since he no longer was in Stavanger, he essentially traded jobs with Daniel Knoff, the County Governor of Lister og Mandals Amt. Knoff moved to Stavanger became the County Governor of Stavanger Amt and Rosenkratz became the County Governor of Lister og Mandals Amt.

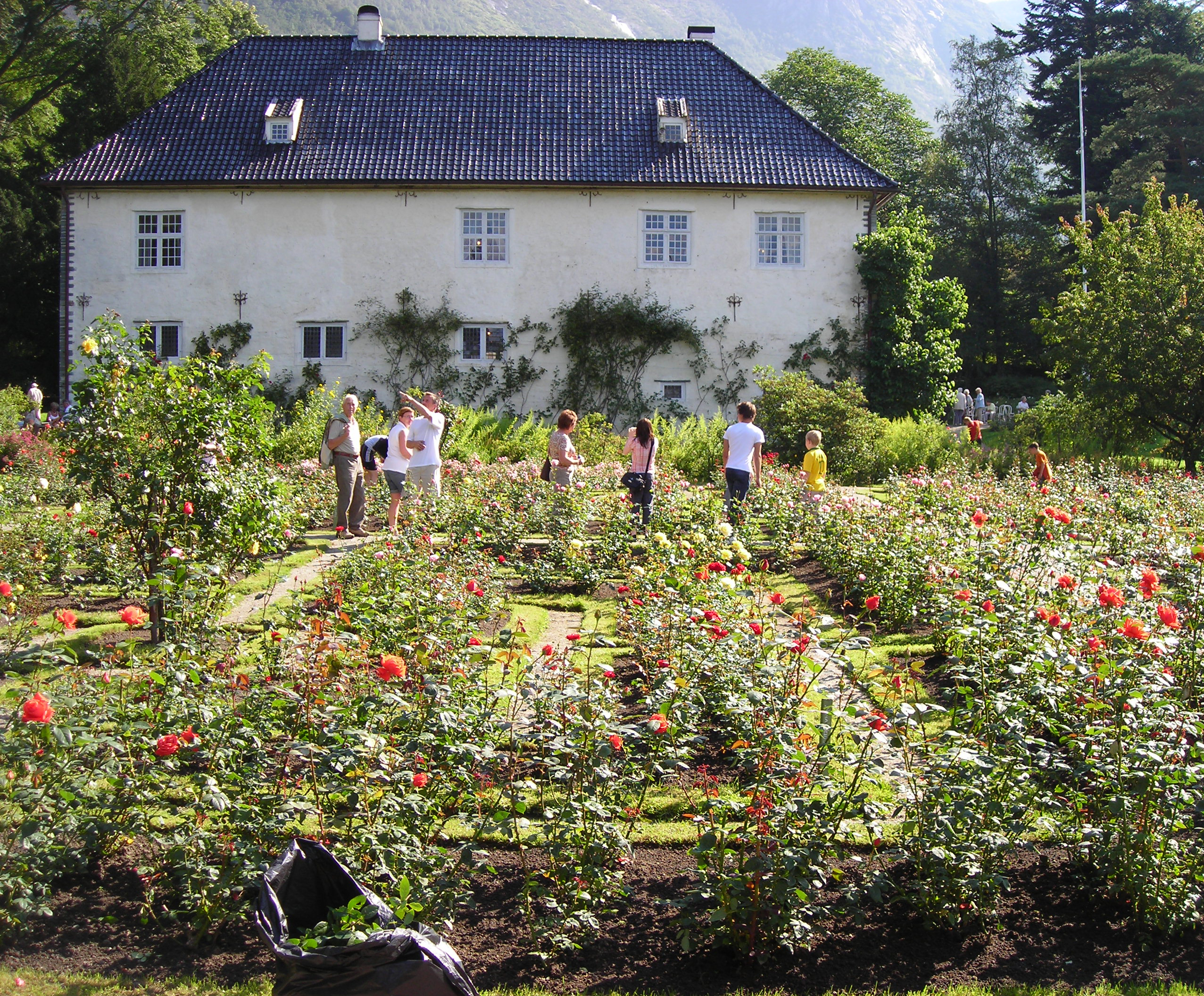
The Rosendal Manor

In 1657-1658, he married Karen Mowat (1630-1675), the daughter of Axel Mowat (1592– 1661). His father-in-law was one of the largest landowner in western Norway. They were the parents of four sons and five daughters. After the death of his first wife, he married Clara Catharina von Stockhausen (d. 1689), who had previously served as the chambermaid of Queen Charlotte Amalie, wife of King Christian V of Denmark.

Through his marriage with Karen Mowat, who following the deaths of her brothers was the sole heiress of her father's fortune, Rosenkrantz achieved an estate which eventually formed the basis for Barony Rosendal at Kvinnherad in Hordaland. In 1678, King Christian V gave the estate the status of Barony of Rosendal (Baroniet Rosendal) at which time, Rosenkrantz became the first (and only) baron in Norway.

== Related reading ==
- Oyrehagen Sunde, Jorn (2009). From a Shetland Lairdship to a Norwegian Barony: The Mouat Family and the Barony of Rosendal. Shetland Heritage Publications. ISBN 9780955764233.

Government offices
Preceded by Henrik Below	County Governor of Stavanger Amt; 1673–1683	Succeeded by Daniel Knoff
Preceded by Ove Juul	Diocesan Governor of Christianssand Stiftamt; 1680–1685; From 1680-1682 the title was Diocesan Governor of Stavanger Stiftamt. The position was moved to Christianssand in 1882.	Succeeded by Christian Stockfleth
Preceded by Daniel Knoff	County Governor of Lister og Mandals Amt; 1683–1685	Succeeded by Christian Stockfleth
