= Kristoffer Throndsen =

Norwegian squire, admiral and feudal overlord (1500–1565)

- Born: c. 1500; Kvinnherad, Norway, Kalmar Union
- Died: c. 1565 (aged c. 65)
- Occupations: Privateer; Navigator for Denmark-Norway
- Title: Admiral of the Kingdoms; Squire
- Spouse: Karen Knutsdatter
- Children: Enno, Anna, Kristine, Magdalene, Dorthea, Else, Maren, Margrethe
- Relatives: Olav Engelbrektsson (relative, possible uncle)

Kristoffer Throndsen (c. 1500–1565), posthumously also with the family name Rustung, was a squire, admiral, feudal overlord in Norway and Denmark, privateer captain and pirate. Kristoffer served Archbishop Olav Engelbrektsson, the interregnum leader of Norway, in the last years of the Kalmar Union.

Kristoffer is famous for playing a role in the last years before the Reformation in Norway, first as the head of the national fleet, defending Norway from attacking Danish ships; and also as the murderer of Vincent Lunge, a Danish nobleman sent to Bergen in 1536 to enforce the choice the King of Denmark Christian III as king of Norway. This dramatic moment in Norwegian history is memorialized today in an annual "midnight opera" sponsored by the Norwegian Ministry of Culture. Titled Olav Engelbrektsson, it takes place on the premises of the castle, outside Trondheim.

Kristoffer appealed for pardon from Christian III, probably for the murder but also for his piracy of the Norwegian coast under foreign flags, under which he attacked Danish ships and installations in Norway after 1536/1537. He was granted a post under the Danish crown, which badly needed a naval leader. He served for several years as an admiral in the Danish-Norwegian Navy, and later in Copenhagen as a Royal Danish Consul to the King.

His most famous child was Anna Throndsen, known in Norway as "the Scottish Lady" (Skottefruen). Anna is famous in modern-day Norway, for her days in the court of Mary Queen of Scots, during her marriage to James Hepburn, Lord Bothwell.

== Biography ==
=== Early life ===
Kristoffer was probably born sometime around the year 1500 in Seim in what is now Kvinnherad Municipality in Western Norway. His ancestry or even who his parents were has not been widely established, although many theories have been suggested. The closest to contemporary sources primarily consist of two 17th-century ancestry charts which says his parents were Trond Sigurdsson Rustung of Seim and Karen Koll of Nessa. Another source suggests that his father was Trond Engelbrekston and Karen Koll of Nessa. Which makes sense as during his adolescence Kristoffer was the graduate of the arch-Catholic University of Cologne with his cousin Gaute Taraldsson. Around the year 1526 to 1527, he moved to Trondheim, where he took service with the Archbishop Olav Engelbrektsson, who was his uncle. A diploma from this time diploma. Norw.7.789 and diplom.Norw.8.589-97, writes that Olav was the uncle of Christopher. Olav was the son of Engelbregt Gunnarsen and Jorunn Ivarsdatter Aspa. Engelbregt Gunnarsen was married twice, his second wife was Cecilie Mortensdatter Randa who was the mother of Trond Engelbrekston who was said to have been married to Karen Koll and the father of Kristoffer by some accounts. This connection does indicate that Olav was indeed Kristoffer's uncle.

=== The Reformation and turmoil ===
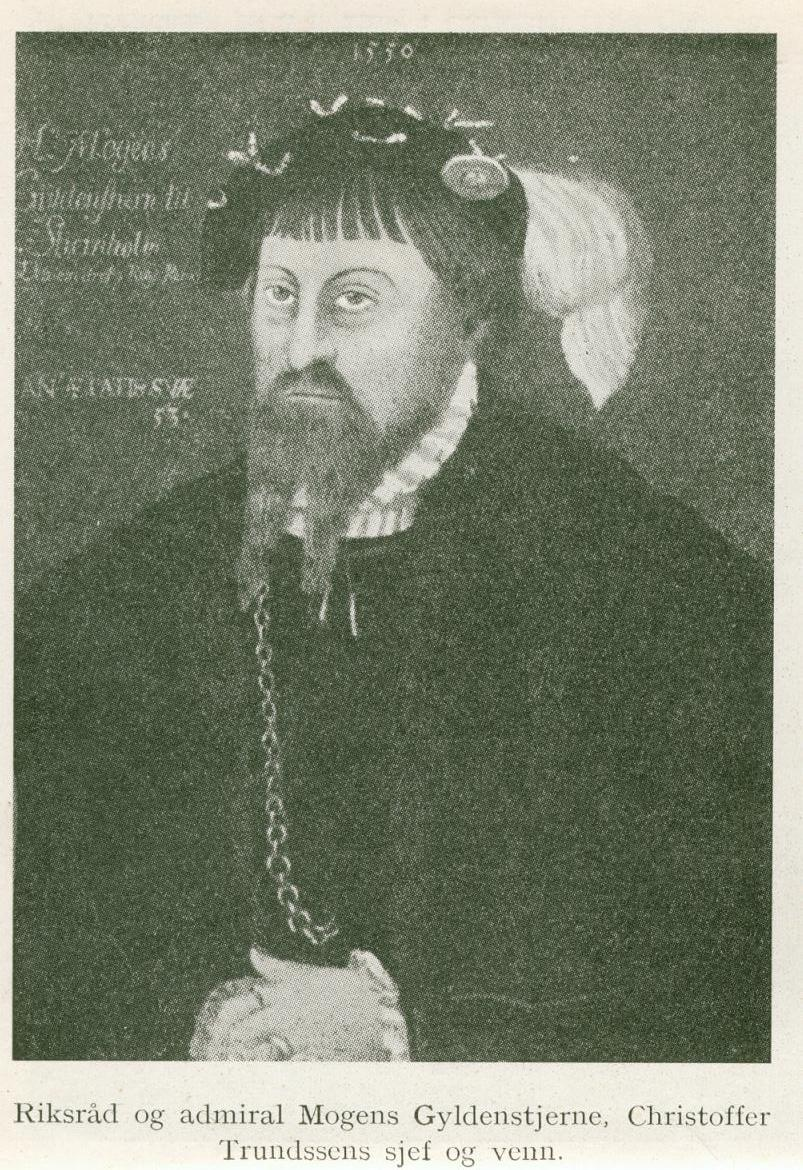
Mogens Guildernstern, Royal Advisor to King Christian III who supported Kristoffer's entry into Danish Naval Military service.

After moving to Trondheim around 1527 he became something of a right hand for archbishop Olav Engelbrektsson, the last catholic archbishop in Norway, and was a loyal support of his until 1537. Some have speculated that Kristoffer possibly was the nephew of Olav Engelbrektsson, primarily supported by a somewhat ambiguous source in which Mary of Austria, Queen of Hungary call Kristoffer his blutverwonter frundt ("relative by blood"), although the theory have been assisted by further circumstances.

In the same year, a pirate, Klement, came to Bergen where he captured the clergy as hostages. Vincens Lunge, the feudal overlord of Bergenhus at the time then formed a fleet, and also received aid from the archbishop who sent Kristoffer with a few ships. Lunge was however soon startled by rumours of the Danish king deposing the feudal lord of Akershus, and wanted Kristoffer to stay for his defence for a while. Kristoffer however became impatient, and eventually got himself accused of piracy after boarding Dutch, Scottish and English tradingships. James V of Scotland demanded the release of the ships Bonaventura and Pheyther from Vincens Lunge. Lunge then demanded that the stolen goods should be replaced or the guilty being executed, with Olaf Lang and Kristoffer being most to blame. When Kristoffer arrived in Bergen, he and his men was soon arrested, only to find himself and most of his men escaping from prison one early morning.

The relationship between Vincens Lunge and the Catholic archbishop gradually worsened during the 1530s, resulting in numerous conflicts between them, as well as Inger, Lady of Austraat. Before this happened, Kristoffer had been in the top reach of Dano-Norwegian politics. In 1531, Kristoffer and the archbishop changed their loyalty from Frederick I to Christian II, resulting in conflicts which led to Kristoffer being forced to withdraw to Steinvikholm Castle, of which he likely was the lord for a few years. Lunge in 1535 traveled to Trondheim to negotiate peace in the conflict. With increasing tensions, it was soon however declared that Lunge and three other members were to be executed, and Kristoffer and his men soon went on and killed Lunge.

Kristoffer was then sent to capture Lunge's estate in Bergen, but was betrayed and imprisoned in Bergenhus Fortress. Not long after however, Kristoffer was exchanged for the diplomat Eske Bille who had been captured earlier by the archbishop. In 1536 Kristoffer arrived in Burgundy to help them against the Danes, and returned to Trondheim with a few ships. He could not help the luck of the archbishop however, and in 1537 they fled Trondheim for the Netherlands, barely managing to escape.

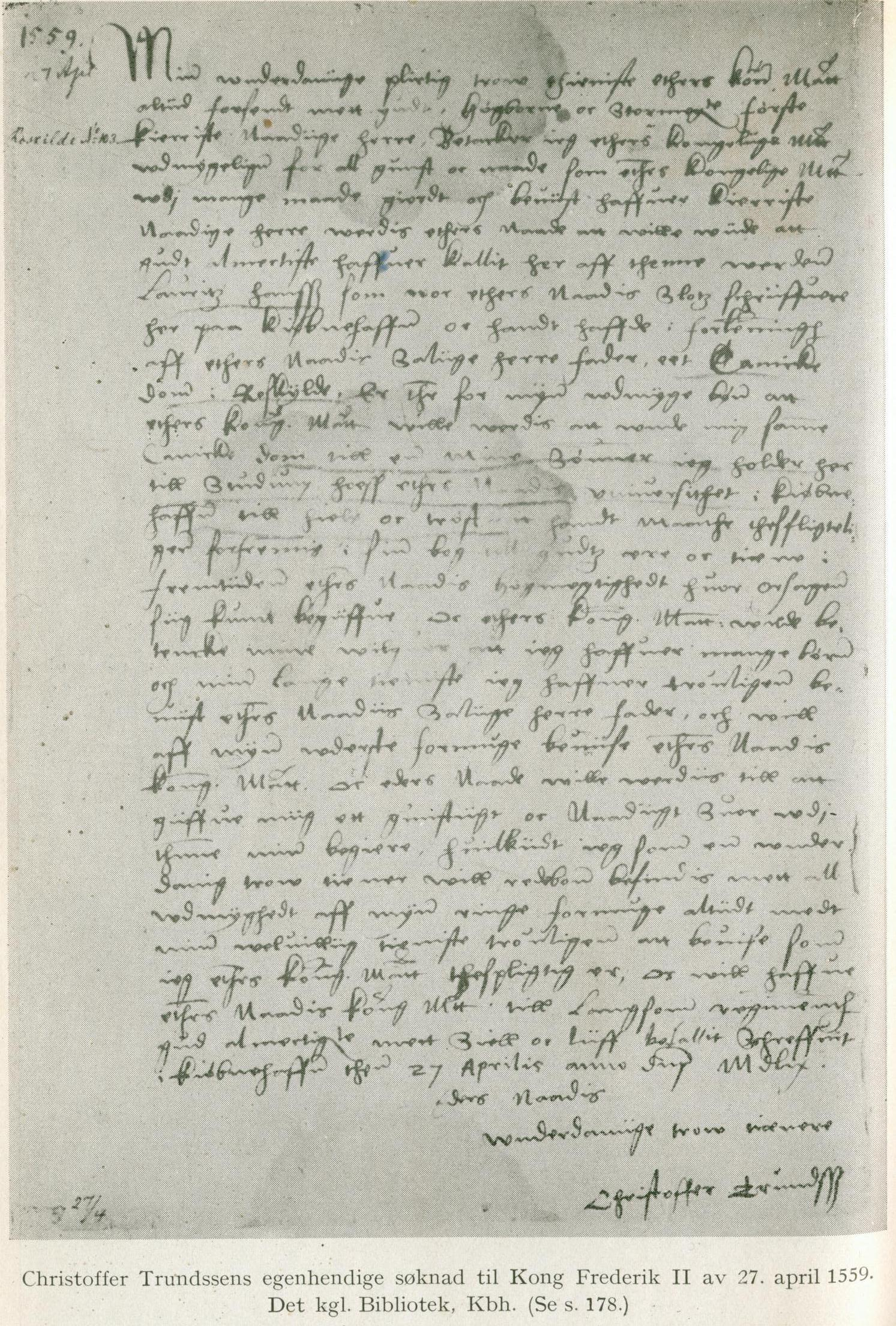
Kristoffer's letter to Christian III asking pardon for wartime piracy and requesting a post as Naval Admiral in the Royal Danish fleet.

=== Later years ===
The next years, Kristoffer operated as a privateer, with a letter of marque titled "Christoph von Trundheim, Marskalk in Norweger" from Frederick II, Count Palatine of the Rhine. Under protection from Charles V, Holy Roman Emperor, and Mary of Burgundy, he got involved in Charles V's war against France. One time he left from Veere in Zeeland with three ships, and ended up taking nine ships from the French.

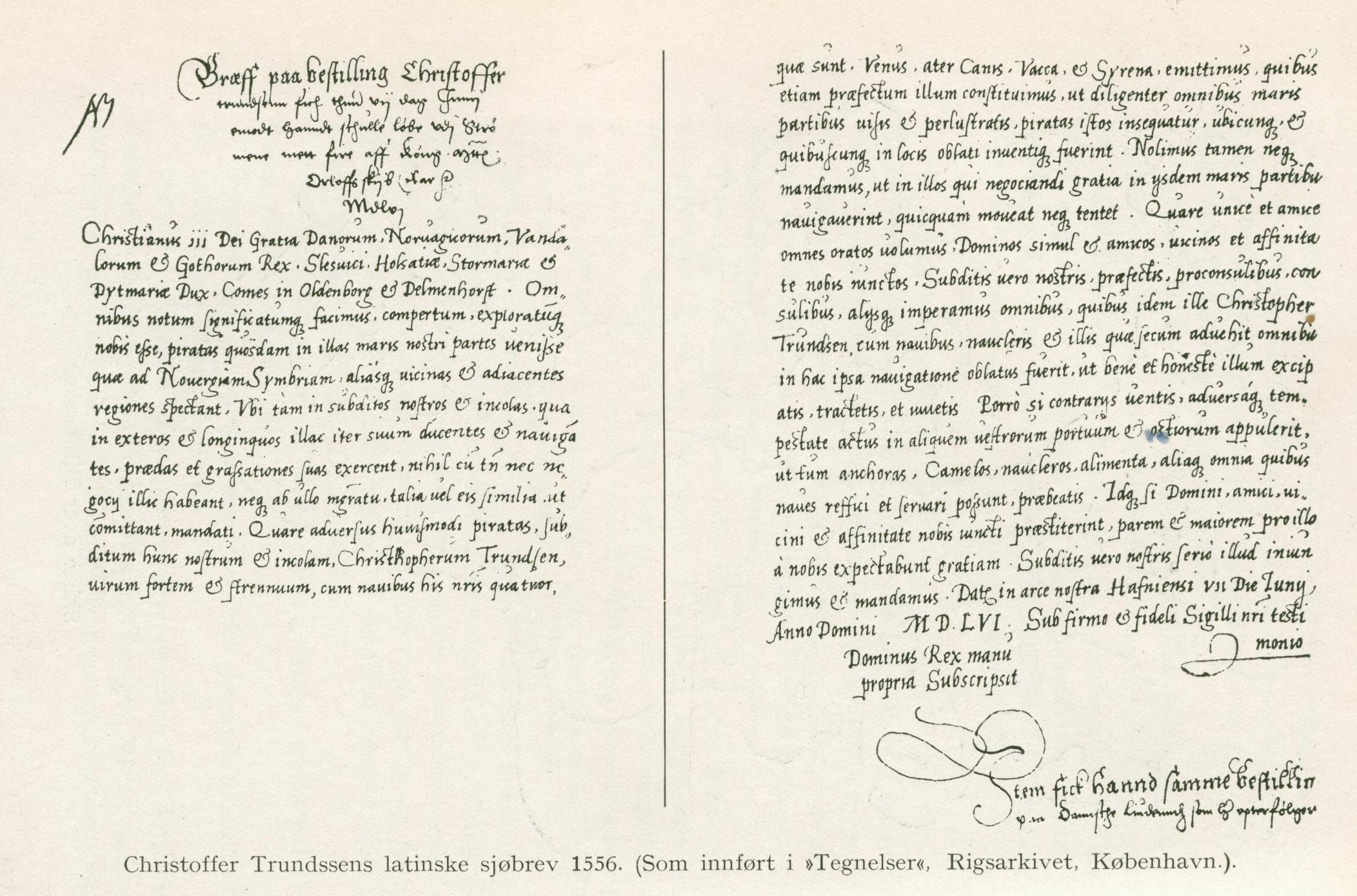
Kristoffer's seapapers while operating as a privateer between service as leading Norwegian Admiral and the Danish Royal Navy.

He settled in Emden and became good friends with Count Enno II of East Frisia. Under his protection, he raided the Norwegian coast many times, including Utstein Abbey and Stavanger bispegård in 1539. During this time he boarded many tradingships, and though the Danish king sent scouts after him he was never caught.

Around 1542-43 he got pardoned by Christian III of Denmark after he had applied for it, and was engaged as a naval officer, which Denmark-Norway had a desperate need for. As Kristoffer had risen to fame, the kings advisors had advised the king to pardon him if he was to join them. At first he only had charge of a small ship with a crew of 20 people, however after only three months, he advanced to admiral, titled Admiral of the Kingdoms (Rigernes Admiral). When he was admiral he was in charge of 40 ships with a crew of 5000 people. At the time he was the only Norwegian with a leader position in the navy. His missions included sailing to Iceland to calm down a small rebellion, and later fighting with his fleet in the Northern Seven Years' War against the Swedish-Norwegian admiral Jakob Bagge.

Kristoffer died in 1565 at around the age of 65, and is probably buried at Kvinnherad Church.

== Family ==
Kristoffer was married to Karen Knutsdatter, whose full name is revealed from a 1569 court case. The same ancestry charts which makes the claim for Kristoffer's parents, also hold Karen with the family name Schanke, and her father as Knut Pedersen, archdeacon of Trondheim – also attributed with the Schanke name (which he is not contemporaneously known by, and which his own seal seem to contradict).

Kristoffer had eight known children together with Karen:

- Enno; the only son, made a living as a highwayman before being executed. Married a trader's daughter from Danzig, but left no descendants.
- Anna (nicknamed Skottefruen); married the Scottish admiral James Hepburn, 4th Earl of Bothwell. (Noting that Scots history records her inaccurately as a mistress; Norwegian history otherwise.)
- Kristine; married Torbjørn Olavsen Nes.
- Magdalene; married the væpner (squire) Erik Eriksen Orm of Vatne and Valvatne, and left many descendants. Their granddaughter was the mother of admiral Lauritz Galtung. He was third great grandfather of the Russian national poet Alexander Pushkin.
- Dorthea (in Scottish sources called Dorthie Trunsie); married Sir William Stewart of Lutherie, Lord Lyon King of Arms.
- Else; first married to Jon Haard (the Elder) of Gjersvik, secondly to Axel Frederiksen Fridag, senior judge in Bergen, and finally to Anders Mowatt of Hugoland. One notable descendant is the physician-scientist Kenneth B. Christopher, the eleventh great grandson of Else and Mowatt.
- Maren; married Olav Jonson Theiste of Bjelland (in Kvinnherad). One notable descendant was the lawman Nicolas Bergh.
- Margrethe; first married to Danish nobleman Jørgen Pedersen Staur of Hervik (in Ølen) and secondly to Amund Lauritzen/Lassesen Dahl of Sandvik and Malkenes. Left many descendants.

== Rustung name ==
Kristoffer never used the family name "Rustung" himself (a name he has later been popularized by), as it is rather a late 17th-century Danish invention of currently unknown origins. Contemporary naming of him, by others and himself, consist of various spelling variations of "Christoffer Trondsson". He is known to have written his signature "Christoffer Trundsß", suggesting that he himself was the origin of the family name "Tronds" which many of his daughters is known to have used. Such a creation of family names, by shortening the patronym, was common in the Netherlands in the 16th and 17th century, suggesting that Kristoffer changed his name according to this Dutch trend.

His name is denoted with the letters K and T in his seal. In his seal there is a coat of arms, and it is uncertain if he created this coat of arms himself or if it was inherited from his ancestors. The coat of arms is repeated in several heraldic books, such as that of his descendant Nicolas Bergh.
