= Lauritz Galtung =

Norwegian admiral (c. 1615–1661)

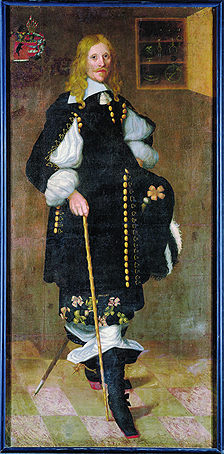
Lauritz Galtung by Karel van Mander d.y. (ca. 1660)

Lauritz Galtung (c. 1615 – 1661) was a Norwegian nobleman and Admiral of the Dano-Norwegian joint fleet. He was ennobled in 1648 at which time his surname was changed from Galte to Galtung.

== Background ==
Lauritz Galtung was born at Torsnes in the parish of Jondal in Søndre Bergenhus county, Norway. His father, Lauritz Johannessen Galte, was one of the largest landowners in Hardanger. The tax-census of 1647 shows that he owned 32 farms or sections of farms in Hardanger, 13 in Sunnhordland, and 6 in Voss. He was the first in the family to have been called Galtung rather than the earlier Galte after the renewed the nobility of the family in 1648.

== Career ==
Galtung was appointed as a captain in the Danish-Norwegian common fleet in 1641. In 1649, Galtung was granted oversight of the parish of Hörje at Hässleholm in Skåne. During the First Anglo-Dutch War (1652–1654), Denmark-Norway continued to conduct trade with the Dutch Republic. In May 1653, Galtung was appointed to lead a squadron of ships to guard the Norwegian coast from Bergen to Lindesnes and to protect merchant ships. During the Dano-Swedish War (1657–58), Lauritz Galtung, now as admiral, was given command of seven ships in the Baltic Sea. In 1658, Lauritz Galtung was appointed as Seignory over Lister Len (now part of Agder county).

== Personal life ==
He was first married to Danish noblewoman Clara Gere of Bjørnstrup; however she died in 1647, only a few months after the marriage. In 1650 he married again to Danish noblewoman, Barbara Grabow with whom he had six children; the first four born at Björnstorp Castle (Swedish: Björnstorp slott) in Scania and the latter two born at Huseby kongsgård in Farsund after moving to Norway in 1658 (as a result of the Danish loss of Scania by the terms of the Treaty of Roskilde).

Lauritz Galtung died during 1661 and was buried at Jondal Church (Jondal kyrkje).

== Literature ==
- H. D. Lind. Kong Frederik den Tredjes Sømagt. Det dansk–norske Søværns Historie 1648–1670. I Den Milo’ske Boghandel, Odense, 1896.
- Johan Ellertsen Galtung. Galtungslekten i fortid og nutid. Eget forlag, Oslo, 1974.
- Elin Galtung Lihaug. «Grabow, Galtung — og Pusjkin; Søkelys på en europeisk slektssammenheng». Norsk Slektshistorisk Tidsskrift, 39, 93–133, 2003.
- Elin Galtung Lihaug. «Aus Brandenburg nach Skandinavien, dem Baltikum und Rußland. Eine Abstammungslinie von Claus von Grabow bis Alexander Sergejewitsch Puschkin 1581–1837». Archiv für Familiengeschichtsforschung, 11, 32–46, 2007.
