= Justine Cathrine Rosenkrantz =

Dano–Norwegian noblewoman, courtier and spy

Justine Cathrine Rosenkrantz (1659 – 1 August 1746) was a Dano–Norwegian noblewoman, courtier and spy.

Rosenkrantz was the daughter of baron Ludvig Rosenkrantz and Karen Mowat. Between 1680 and 1699, she was lady-in-waiting to Christian V's queen consort, Charlotte Amalie of Hesse-Kassel. She was placed in her position by the queen's enemies to spy on the queen; officially to place a Lutheran in the queen's circle, which was otherwise dominated by people of the reformed faith. Rosenkrantz was described as unattractive but very skillful in the art of handling the plots of the royal court and an excellent informer and held a powerful position at court—it was also noted that she was rude and a torment to the queen.

She fell from her position after a great scandal in 1699, when she poisoned the soup of her colleague Anna Emilie von Dalwig, who was her rival over her love interest Emanuel Friedrich von Kötzschau. Dalwig survived the poisoning, but Rosenkrantz was sentenced to death for attempted murder on 17 April 1699, which was commuted to exile in Rønne.
