= Axel Mowat =

Norwegian naval officer and land owner

- Born: 1592; Tysnesøya, Norway
- Died: 27 January 1661 (aged 68–69); Bergen, Norway
- Occupations: landowner and admiral

Axel Mowat (1592 – 27 January 1661) was a Norwegian naval officer and land owner.

Mowat was born in Sunnhordland, probably on the Hovland farm on the island of Tysnesøya which his father had acquired around the year 1590. Mowat was the son of Anders Mowat til Hovland (c. 1530–1606) and Else Christoffersdatter til Seim (c. 1550–1622), daughter of Danish-Norwegian Navy officer Kristoffer Throndsen. His father was engaged in trade between Norway and Shetland. Besides Hovland, his father acquired several other farms within the vicinity of Bergen.

Axel Mowat was a naval officer in the Royal Danish-Norwegian Navy and from 1631 he was in command of various naval units in the North Sea. He had acquired property both through inheritance and marriage. After he retired from the admiralty in the 1640s, he started acquiring additional properties, mainly within Sunnhordland. He became the largest landowner in Western Norway at the time.

Axel Mowat married Karen Bildt (d. 1662), daughter of Knud Danielssøn Bildt til Morland og Lungegården. He was the father of Karen Mowat (d. 1675) and father-in-law of Baron Ludvig Rosenkrantz (1628–85). In time, his properties would form the basis for the estate, Barony Rosendal.

== Related reading ==
- Jorn Oyrehagen Sunde (2009) From a Shetland Lairdship to a Norwegian Barony: The Mouat Family and the Barony of Rosendal (Shetland Heritage Publications) ISBN 978-0955764233
