= Karen Mowat =

Norwegian noblewoman, heiress, and landowner

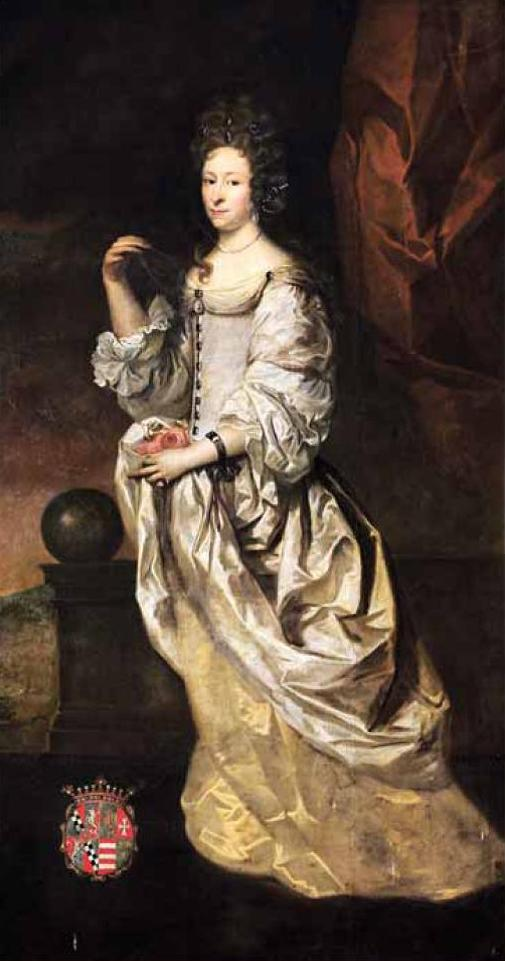
- Painting of Mowat
- Born: c.1630 Tysnesøya, Norway (probably)
- Died: 1675 (aged 44–45)
- Occupations: Noblewoman; Landowner
- Spouse: Ludvig Rosenkrantz
- Father: Axel Mowat

Karen Mowat (c. 1630–1675) was a Norwegian noblewoman, an heiress, and landowner of Norwegian and Scottish origins.

== Biography ==
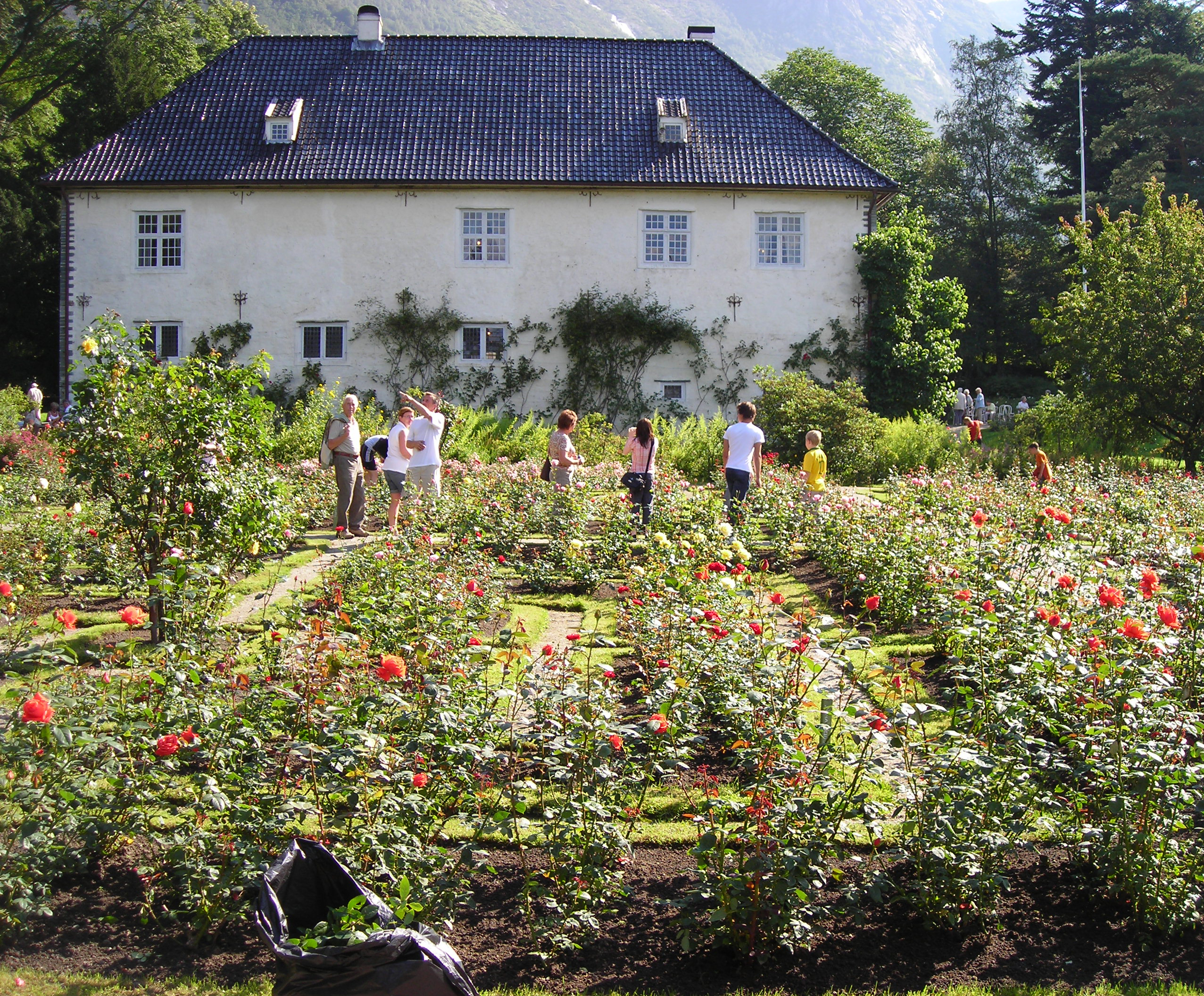
Rosendal Manor

Probably born on the island of Tysnesøya in present-day Tysnes Municipality in Vestland county. Karen Mowat was the daughter of Admiral Axel Mowat (1592–1661) and Karen Knudsdatter Bildt (died 1662). Her father was the largest landowner in Western Norway. Following the death of her two brothers, she became sole heir to her parents' estate.

While her father was sceptical, Karen Mowat married Ludvig Rosenkrantz: a poor but highborn nobleman from Denmark. While Ludvig wanted to settle in Copenhagen, Karen had her will, establishing Rosendal in the present-day Kvinnherad Municipality in Vestland as the family's main residence. They had four sons and five daughters including Justine Cathrine Rosenkrantz (1659–1746) who was a lady-in-waiting to Charlotte Amalie of Hesse-Kassel, queen consort of King Christian V of Denmark-Norway.

In 1678, Ludvig Rosenkrantz was created Baron of Rosendal.

== Related reading ==
- Oyrehagen Sunde, Jorn (2009). From a Shetland Lairdship to a Norwegian Barony: The Mouat Family and the Barony of Rosendal. Shetland Heritage Publications. ISBN 978-0955764233.
