= Barony Rosendal =

Coordinates: 59°59′24″N 6°1′45″E

- Baroniet Rosendal
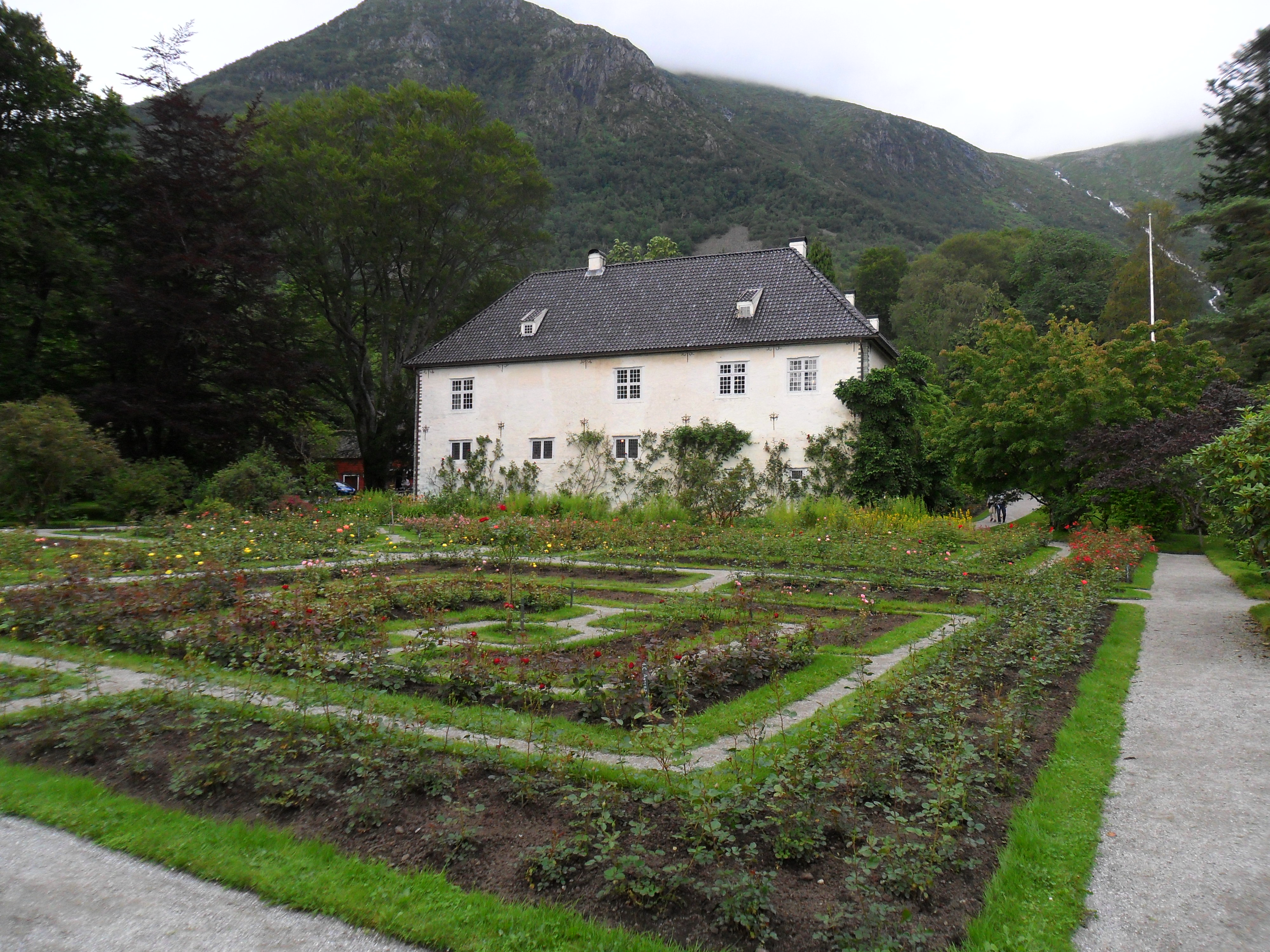
- Rosendal House
- Interactive map of the Barony Rosendal area

General information
- Type: Estate
- Location: Rosendal, Kvinnherad Municipality, Norway
- Construction started: 1661
- Construction stopped: 1665
- Owner: University of Oslo

Barony Rosendal (Norwegian: Baroniet Rosendal) is a historic estate and manor house situated in the village of Rosendal in Kvinnherad Municipality in Vestland county, Norway. The barony was built in the 17th century by Danish noblemen on the old estate of the Norwegian noble Galte family, the current barony estate making out the historical farms of Hatteberg, Mel and Eik.

== History ==
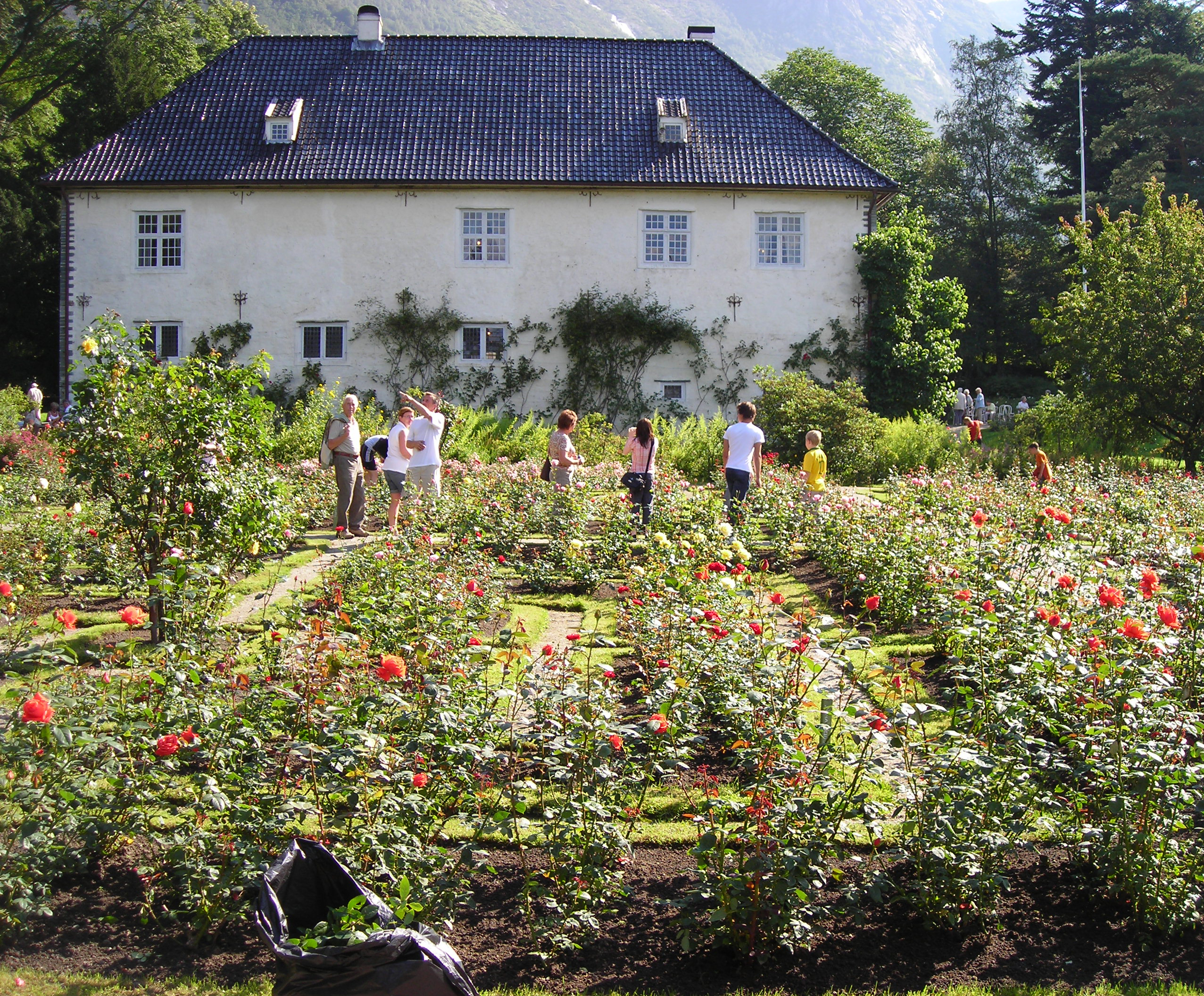
The rose garden

The history of Rosendal dates back to the 1650s, when the nobleman Ludvig Holgersen Rosenkrantz (1628-1685) of the House of Rosenkrantz came to Bergen as commissioner of war for the Danish king, Frederick III. At a ball at the fortress of Bergenhus he met Karen Axelsdatter Mowatt (1630-1675), sole heiress to the largest fortune in the country at the time. Her father was a great land-owner and had more than 550 farms all over the western part of Norway. They were married in 1658 and were given the farm of Hatteberg in Rosendal as a wedding present.

In 1661, Ludwig Rosenkrantz started building his own country house in Rosendal and completed this in 1665. In 1678, King Christian V of Denmark gave the estate the status of a barony - the only one of its kind in Norway. Around 1850, an expansive romantic garden was laid out around the house.

The inhabitants of Rosendal were important people in the cultural life of Norway. Authors Henrik Ibsen, Jonas Lie and Alexander Kielland and painters Hans Gude and Anders Askevold visited Rosendal often. The musicians Edvard Grieg and Ole Bull were guests here. Often there were concerts in Rosendal, a tradition which is still kept alive.

== House of Rosenkrantz ==
Ludvig Holgersen Rosenkrantz received a baronial patent (Friherrepatent) in 1678 from King Christian V. The successive barons were:

- 1658–1685 Baron Ludvig Rosenkrantz (1628-1685)
- 1685–1691 Baron Christian Rosenkrantz
- 1691–1723 Baron Axel Rosenkrantz (1670-1723)

== House of Londemann of Rosencrone ==
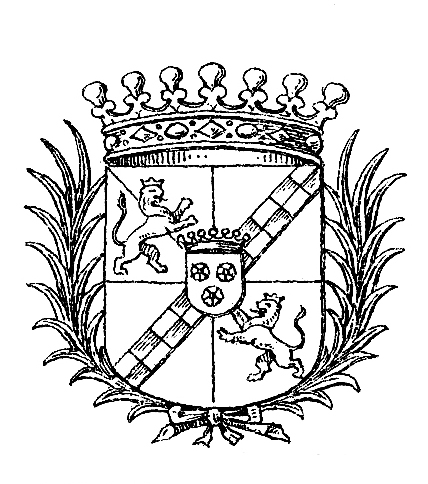
Coat of arms of Rosenkrantz of Rosendal.

In 1749, Bishop Edvard Londemann of Rosendal received a patent of nobility under the name Londemann af Rosencrone. In 1773 he received a baronial patent, and in 1782 was also created a count. The holders of this title were:

- 1745–1749 Count Edvard Londeman Rosencrone (1680-1749)
- 1749–1811 Count Marcus Gerhard Londemann de Rosencrone (1738-1811)

== House of Hoff Rosencrone ==
A member of the Hoff family in the Bohemian nobility was naturalized as a Danish-Norwegian nobleman in 1778. One Major Hans Wentzel Hoff (1636-1713), emigrated to Denmark in 1659. His son, Lieutenant Colonel Christian Hoff (1690-1746), married Maria Margrethe Londemann of Rosencrone (1711–62), daughter of the titular bishop Edvard Londemann of Rosencrone (1680-1749), who had founded the fideikommiss of Rosendal. Christian Hoff was the grandfather of Major Christian Henrik Hoff (1768-1837) who inherited the barony of Rosendal, and in 1813 was created a Baron with the title of Hoff Rosencrone. His children were baroness Edvardine Reinholdine Hoff Rosenkrone (1820-1901), who married Hans Christian Weis (1811–82); Marcus Gerhard Hoff Rosenkrone of Rosendal (1823–96); and Hermann Reinhold Hoff Rosenkrone of Rosendal (1829-1900). The two brothers were not Norwegian barons, since they were born after 1821, but were still Danish barons.

- 1811–1837 Baron Christian Henrik Hoff Rosencrone (1768-1837)
- 1837–1896 Marcus Gerhard Hoff Rosenkrone to Rosendal (1823-1896)
- 1896–1900 Hermann Reinhold Hoff Rosenkrone to Rosendal (1829-1900)

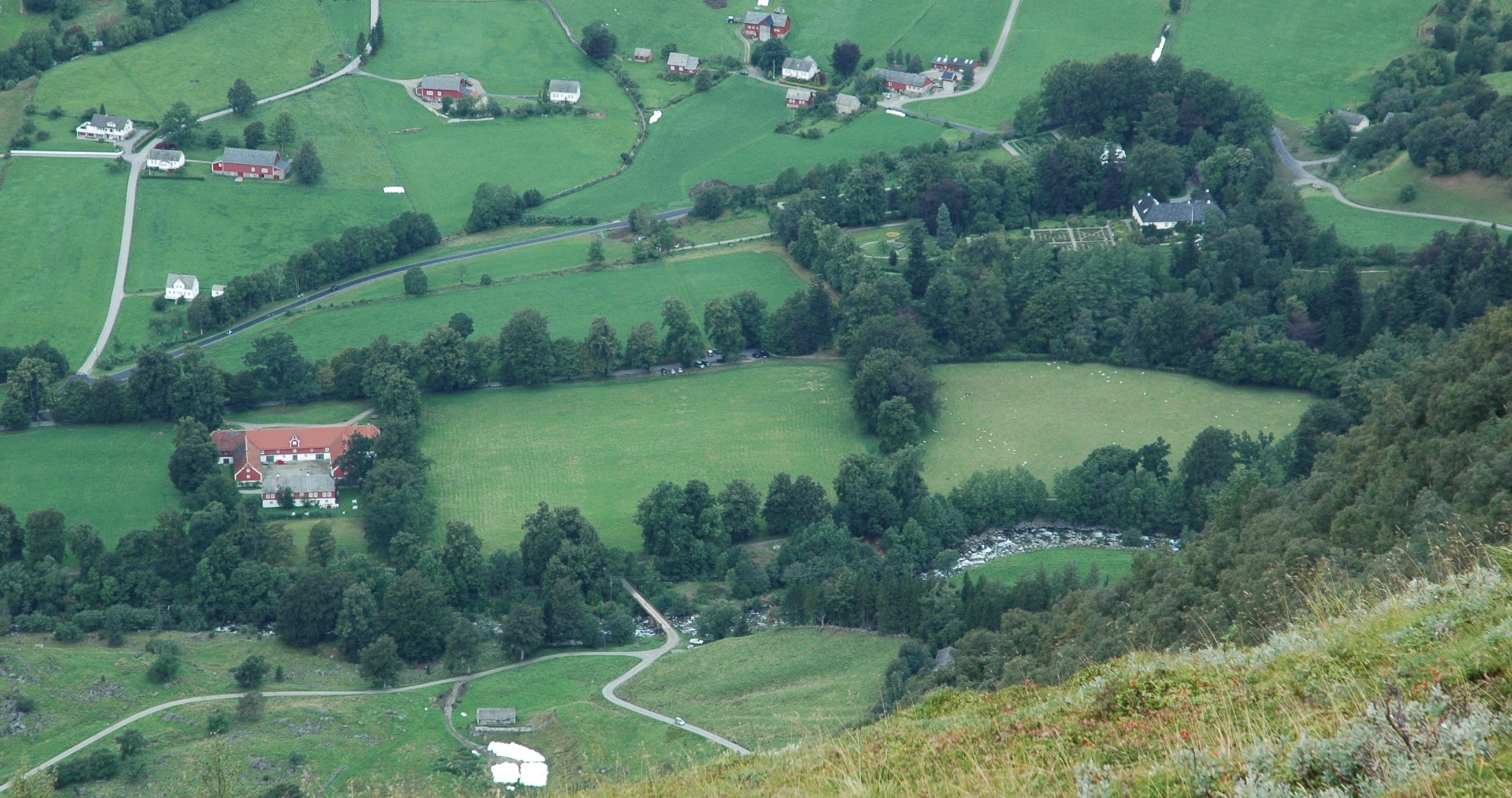
Rosendal House with its garden to the right, the stud farm in red, as seen from Malmangernuten mountain

== House of Weis-Hoff-Rosencrone ==
Baroness Edvardine Reinholdine Hoff-Rosencrone (1820–1901) daughter of baron Christian Henrik Hoff-Rosencrone, married the doctor and later state councilor Hans Christian Weis. She inherited the estate when her little brother died in 1900, Edvardine died the next year. Their oldest son doctor Christian Weis-Hoff-Rosencrone inherited the estate next.

- 1902–1916 Christian Weis-Hoff-Rosencrone (1850-1916)
- 1916–1927 Edvard Weis-Hoff-Rosencrone (1855-1927)
- 1927–1927 Clara Marie Gædeken née Weis-Hoff-Rosencrone (1845-1934)

== Baroniet Rosendal museum ==
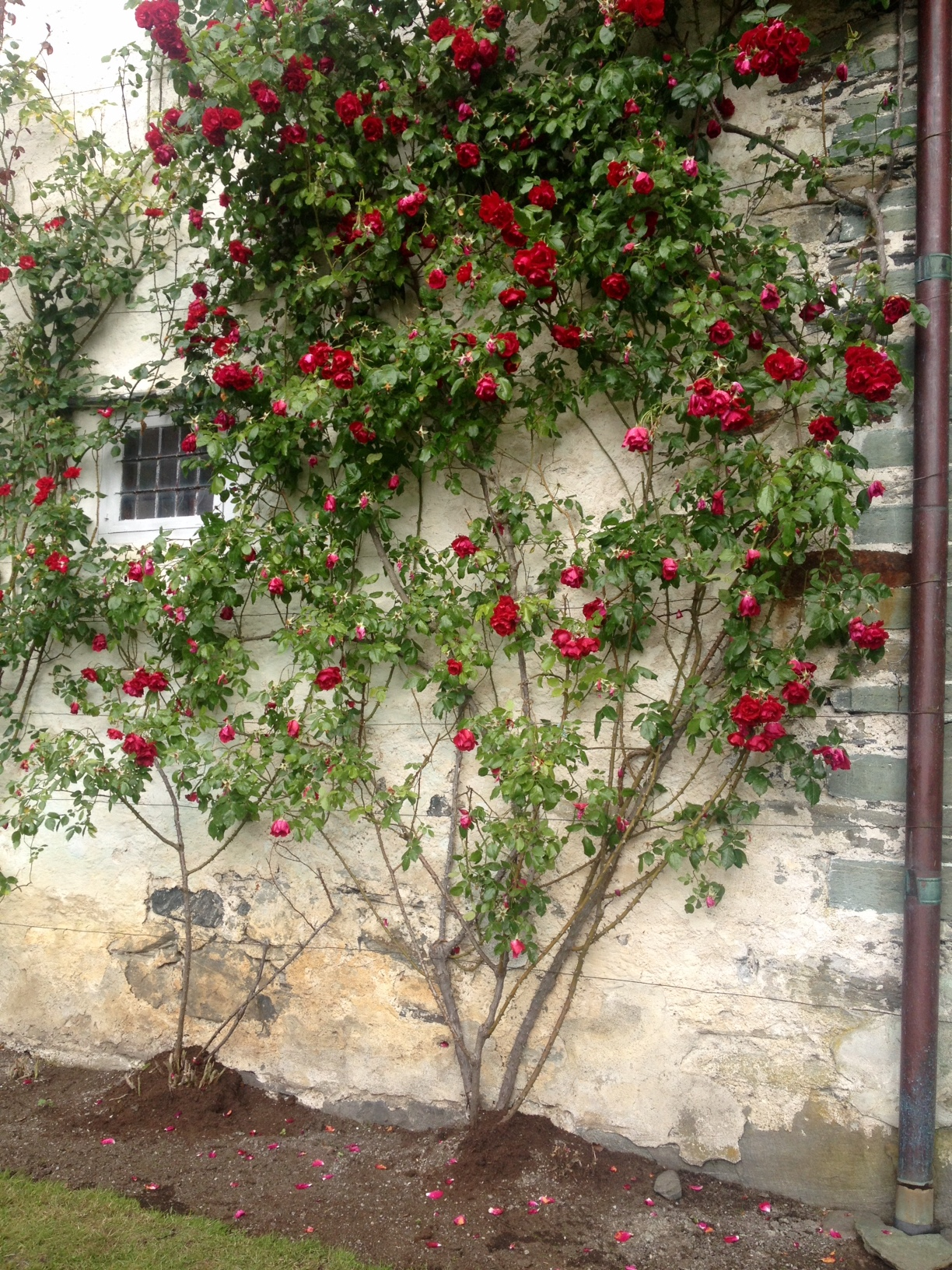
Roses growing along Barony wall

The property remained in private ownership until 1927, when the last owner donated it to the University of Oslo. The manor is now operated as the Baroniet Rosendal museum. The museum offers valuable information about an important period of Norwegian history.

A guided tour of the manor takes visitors through the different periods of occupation from 1665 up to 1930. The oldest restored rooms are still decorated as they were in the early 19th century. The garden is often referred to as the most magnificent Victorian garden in Norway. Among other things around 2000 roses in bloom can be experienced here from June to November.

== Related reading ==
- Jorn Oyrehagen Sunde (2009) From a Shetland Lairdship to a Norwegian Barony: The Mouat Family and the Barony of Rosendal (Shetland Heritage Publications) ISBN 978-0955764233
