= Jondal =

Jondal or Jondalen may refer to:

== Places ==
- Jondal (village), a village in Ullensvang Municipality in Vestland county, Norway
- Jondal Municipality, a former municipality in the old Hordaland county, Norway
- Jondal Church, a church in Ullensvang Municipality in Vestland county, Norway
- Jondal Tunnel, a road tunnel in Ullensvang Municipality in Vestland county, Norway
- Jondalen, a village in Kongsberg Municipality in Buskerud county, Norway
- Jondalen Church a church in Kongsberg Municipality in Buskerud county, Norway

== People ==
- Magnus Jøndal (born 1988), a former Norwegian handball player
