= List of tunnels in Norway =

This list of tunnels in Norway includes any road, rail or waterway tunnel in Norway.

There are over 1260 road tunnels in Norway with total length exceeding 1550 km.

The longest road tunnels (>7 km, with opening year and length):

Name	Opening year	Length (m)
Lærdal Tunnel	2000	24,509
Ryfylke Tunnel	2019	14,400
Gudvanga Tunnel	1991	11,428
Folgefonna Tunnel	2001	11,150
Toven Tunnel	2014	10,665
Jondal Tunnel	2012	10,400
Mælefjell Tunnel	2019	9354
Lyshorn Tunnel	2022	9260
Karmøy Tunnel	2013	8900
Kjøsnes Tunnel	2022	8600
Korgfjell Tunnel	2005	8530
Steigen Tunnel	1991	8079
Bømlafjord Tunnel	2000	7888
Eiksund Tunnel	2008	7765
Svartis Tunnel	1986	7615
Høyanger Tunnel	1982	7543
Vallavik Tunnel	1985	7510
Åkrafjord Tunnel	2000	7400
Oslofjord Tunnel	2000	7230

The longest subsea road tunnels (see also List of subsea tunnels in Norway):

Name	Opening year	Length (m)	Depth (-m)
Ryfylke Tunnel	2019	14,400	292
Karmøy Tunnel	2013	8900	139
Bømlafjord Tunnel	2000	7888	260
Eiksund Tunnel	2008	7765	287
Oslofjord Tunnel	2000	7230	134
North Cape Tunnel	1999	6871	212
Byfjord Tunnel	1992	5875	223
Hitra Tunnel	1994	5645	264
Hundvåg Tunnel	2020	5500	94.5

The longest railway tunnels:

Name	Opening year	Length (m)
Blix Tunnel	2022	19,500
Romerike Tunnel	1999	14,580
Holmestrandsporten	2016	12,385
Lieråsen Tunnel	1973	10,723
Finse Tunnel	1993	10,600
Kvineshei Tunnel	1943	9065
Hægebostad Tunnel	1943	8474
Trollkona Tunnel	1987	8043
Ulriken Tunnel	1964	7670
Majorstuen-Hasle Oslo Metro line 5	1966–1987	7060

== See also ==
- List of subsea tunnels in Norway
- List of tunnels by location
