= Mauranger =

District in Vestland county, Norway

Coordinates: 60.1198°N 6.2715°E

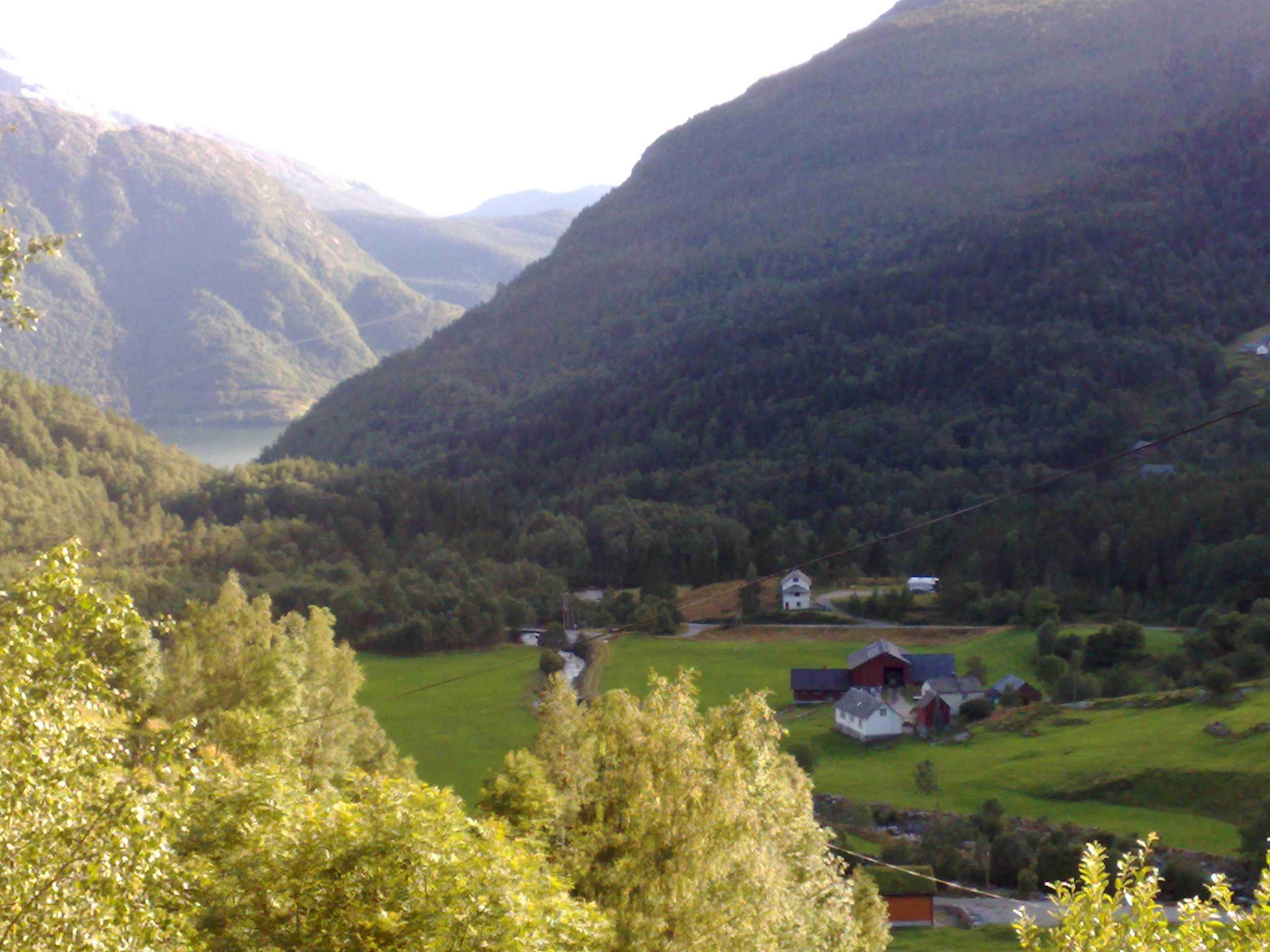
Gjetingsdalen seen from the farm Bakka.

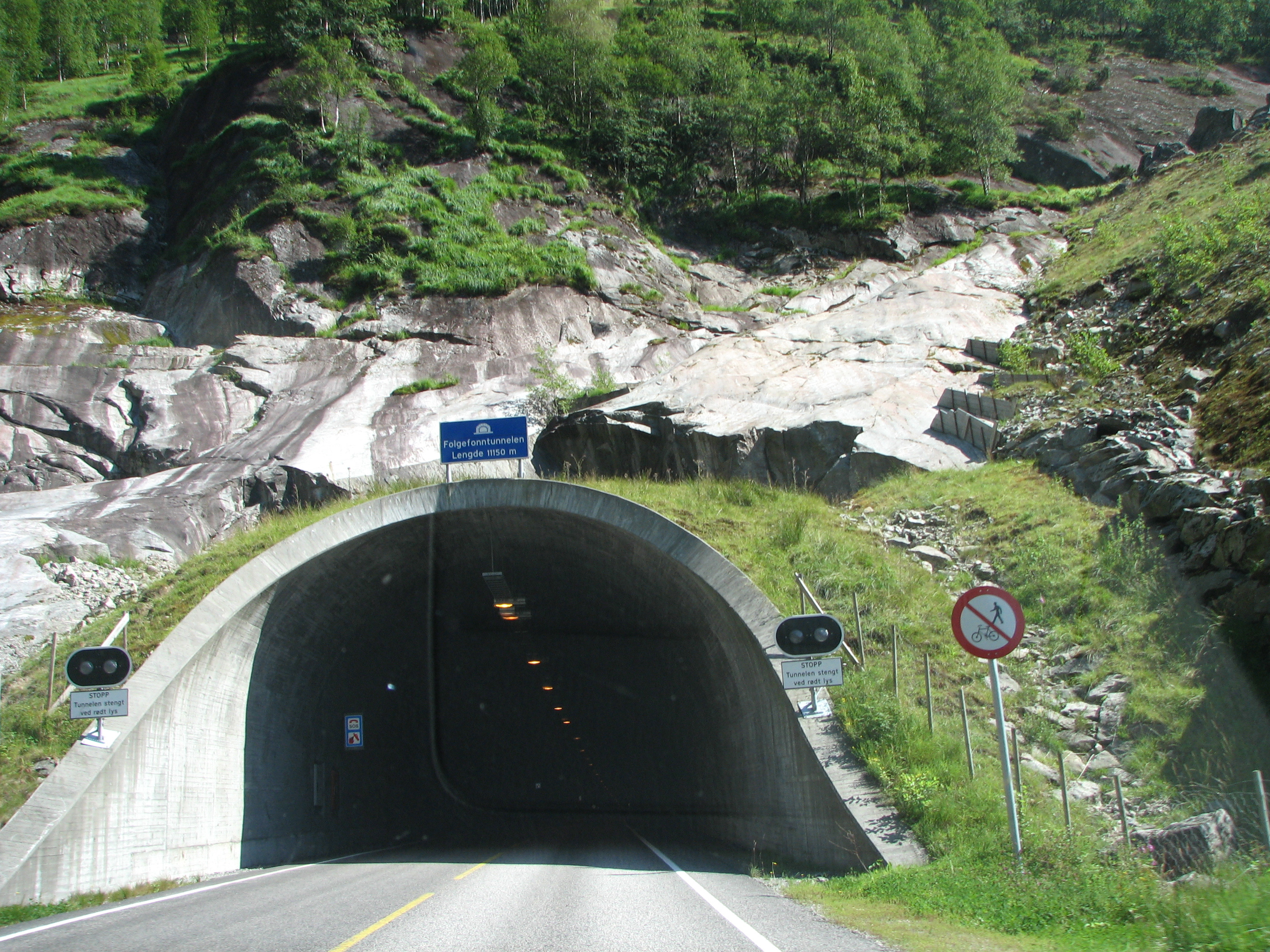
The Folgefonna Tunnel seen from Austrepollen.

Mauranger is the northernmost district of Kvinnherad Municipality in Vestland county, Norway. The district is centered on the Maurangsfjorden on the western side of the vast Folgefonna glacier. Mauranger consists of the villages of Sunndal, Austrepollen, Nordrepollen, and Gjetingsdalen. The scenery is characterised by its closeness to Folgefonna, several valleys, and precipitous mountainsides. The main industries in Mauranger are tourism, agriculture, fish farming and power production.

The Mauranger area was historically isolated by the mountains, glaciers, and the fjord, with the only access by boat, and more recently one small road running along the coastline. Then in 2001, the Folgefonna Tunnel opened, connecting Mauranger to the neighboring town of Odda on the eastern side of the Folgefonna glacier. This has made Mauranger more accessible, and it has led to an increase in tourism. Mauranger was made even more accessible in 2012 with the opening of the Jondal Tunnel connecting it with the village of Jondal to the northwest. Now, Mauranger is located on a main transportation route through Sunnhordland.
