= Jondal Municipality =

Former municipality in Hordaland, Norway

Jondal Municipality Jondal kommune
- Former municipality
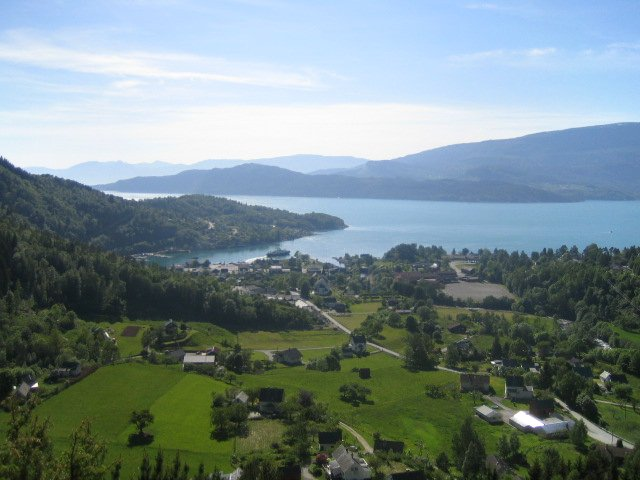
- View of Jondal

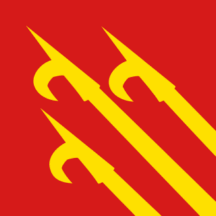
- Flag Coat of arms

- Hordaland within Norway

- Jondal within Hordaland
- Coordinates: 60°16′06″N 06°19′45″E
- Country: Norway
- County: Hordaland
- District: Hardanger
- Established: 1 Jan 1863
  - Preceded by: Strandebarm Municipality
- Disestablished: 1 Jan 2020
  - Succeeded by: Ullensvang Municipality
- Administrative centre: Jondal

Government
  - Mayor (2009–2019): Jon Larsgard (Sp)

Area (upon dissolution)
  - Total: 247.08 km^{2} (95.40 sq mi)
  - Land: 234.73 km^{2} (90.63 sq mi)
  - Water: 12.35 km^{2} (4.77 sq mi) 5%
  - Rank: #305 in Norway
- Highest elevation: 1,644 m (5,394 ft)

Population (2019)
  - Total: 1,087
  - Rank: #387 in Norway
  - Density: 4.4/km^{2} (11/sq mi)
  - Change (10 years): ▲ +6.4%
- Demonym(s): Jondøl; Jondøling

Official language
  - Norwegian form: Nynorsk
- Time zone: UTC+01:00 (CET)
  - Summer (DST): UTC+02:00 (CEST)
- ISO 3166 code: NO-1227

Jondal is a former municipality in the old Hordaland county, Norway. The 247.08-square-kilometre (95.40 sq mi) municipality existed from 1863 until its dissolution in 2020. The area is now part of Ullensvang Municipality in the traditional district of Hardanger in Vestland county. The administrative centre was the village of Jondal. Other villages in the municipality included Herand, Kysnesstranda, and Torsnes.

Prior to its dissolution in 2020, the 247.08-square-kilometre (95.40 sq mi) municipality was the 305th largest by area out of the 422 municipalities in Norway. Jondal Municipality was the 387th most populous municipality in Norway with a population of about 1,087. The municipality's population density was 4.4 inhabitants per square kilometre (11/sq mi) and its population had increased by 6.4% over the previous 10-year period.

== General information ==
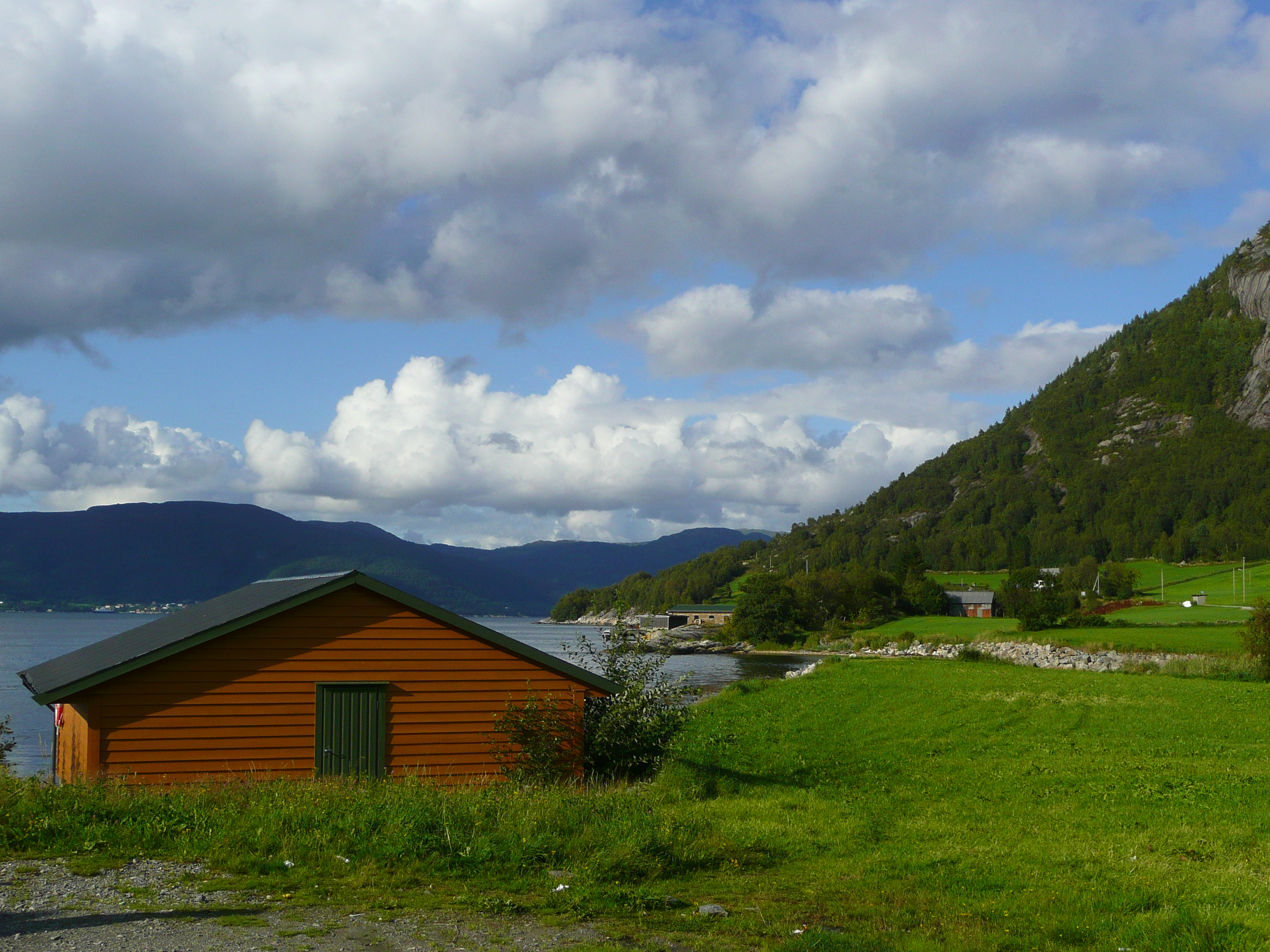
View of Jondal

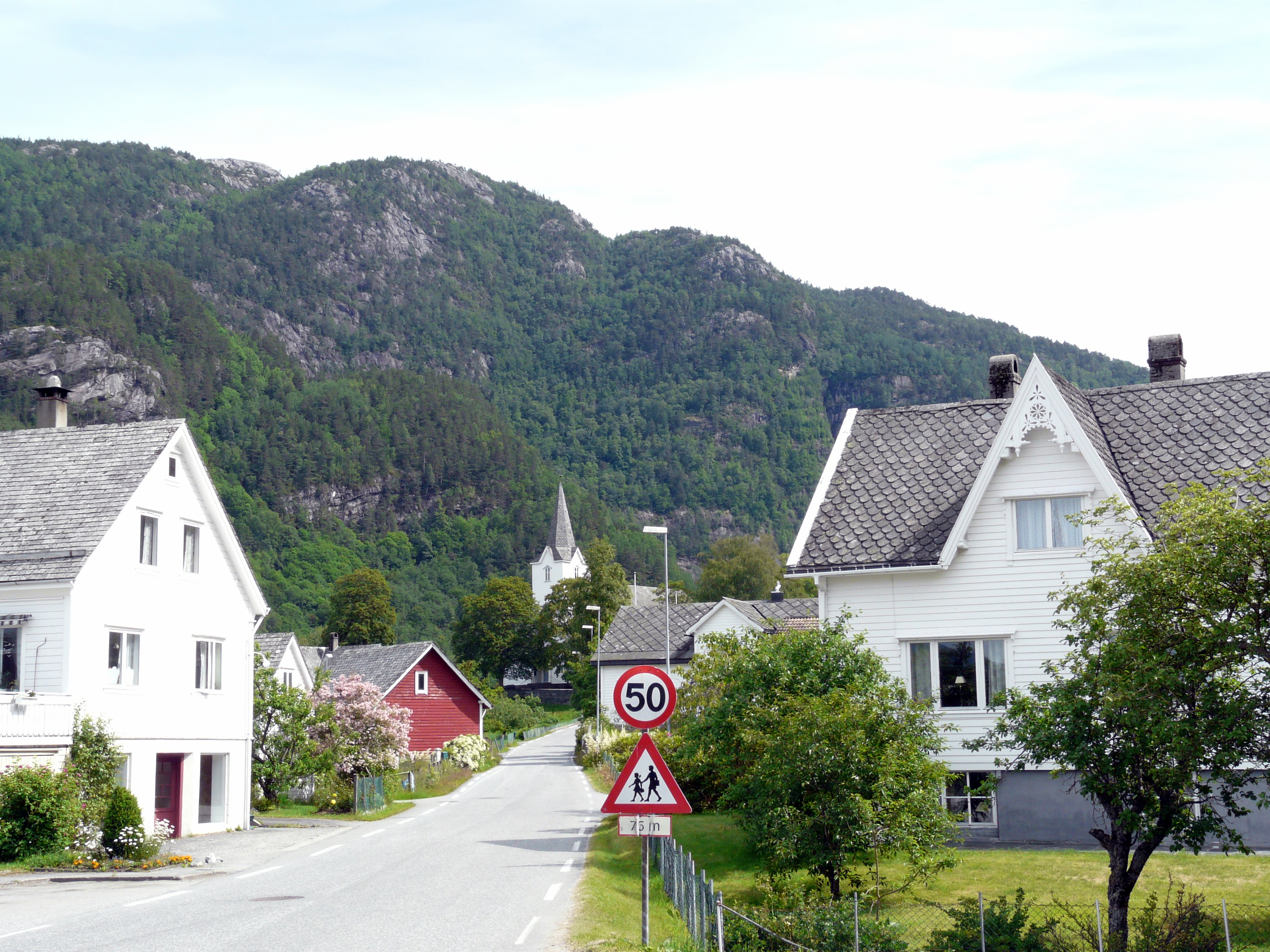
Village of Jondal, with the church in the back

The municipality of Jondal was established on 1 January 1863 when the large Strandebarm Municipality was divided as follows:

- the eastern district which was mostly east of the Hardangerfjorden (population: 1,663) became the new Jondal Municipality
- the western district which was mostly west of the Hardangerfjorden (population: 2,200) remained as a smaller Strandebarm Municipality

During the 1960s, there were many municipal mergers across Norway due to the work of the Schei Committee. On 1 January 1965, there were two changes that effected Jondal municipality: the part of Jondal located on the northwestern side of the Hardangerfjorden (population: 515) was transferred to Kvam Municipality and the Kysnesstranda area of Strandebarm Municipality (population: 100) was transferred to Jondal Municipality.

Then on 1 January 2013, the southwestern part of the Folgefonna peninsula (south of Kysnesstranda) was transferred to Jondal from the neighboring Kvinnherad Municipality. This added forty new residents and 37.1 square kilometres (14.3 sq mi) of land area to the municipality.

On 1 January 2020, Jondal Municipality, Odda Municipality, and Ullensvang Municipality were merged. The new municipality was named Ullensvang Municipality and its administrative centre is the town of Odda. Historically, this municipality was part of the old Hordaland county. On 1 January 2020, the newly enlarged Ullensvang Municipality became a part of the newly-formed Vestland county (after Hordaland and Sogn og Fjordane counties were merged).

=== Name ===
The municipality (originally the parish) is named after the Jondalen valley (Old Norse: Jónardalr) which runs through the municipality and it is where the village of Jondal is located. The first element is an old river name Jón (now called Jondalselvi). The meaning of the river name is unknown. The last element is dalr which means "valley" or "dale".

=== Coat of arms ===
The coat of arms was granted on 27 November 1987 and it was in use until 1 January 2020 when the municipality was dissolved. The official blazon is "Gules, three boathooks bendwise issuant from sinister base Or" (Norwegian: På raud grunn tre skrått framveksande gule båtshaker). This means the arms have a red field (background) and the charge is a set of three boat hooks lined up diagonally. The charge has a tincture of Or which means it is commonly colored yellow, but if it is made out of metal, then gold is used. This design was chosen to symbolise the importance of sailing and shipping along the Hardangerfjord. Historically, Jondal Municipality has been known for its shipyards and sailing college. The arms were designed by Arvid Sveen. The municipal flag has the same design as the coat of arms.

=== Churches ===
The Church of Norway has one parish (sokn) within Jondal Municipality. It is part of the Hardanger og Voss prosti (deanery) in the Diocese of Bjørgvin.

Churches in Jondal Municipality
Parish (sokn)	Church name	Location of the church	Year built
Jondal	Jondal Church	Jondal	1888

== Geography ==
Jondal Municipality was located on the Folgefonna peninsula in the Hardanger district, on the eastern shore of the Hardangerfjorden. It was bounded by the large Folgefonna glacier to the southeast (inside Folgefonna National Park). The highest point in the municipality was the 1,644-metre (5,394 ft) tall point at the top of the Folgefonna glacier. The lake Juklavatnet was located on the municipal border with Kvinnherad Municipality. The 10-kilometre (6.2 mi) long tunnel runs under the glacier from Jondal to Mauranger (in Kvinnherad Municipality).

Kvam Municipality was located to the west and north, Ullensvang Municipality was located to the east, and Kvinnherad Municipality was located to the south.

== Population ==
Religion in Jondal
religion	percent
Church of Norway	95.79%

Historical population

Year	Pop.	±% p.a.
1863	1,663	—
1865	1,663	+0.00%
1875	1,916	+1.43%
1891	2,020	+0.33%
1900	2,191	+0.91%
1910	2,156	−0.16%

Year	Pop.	±% p.a.
1920	2,022	−0.64%
1930	1,910	−0.57%
1946	1,896	−0.05%
1951	1,871	−0.27%
1960	1,744	−0.78%
1970	1,268	−3.14%

Year	Pop.	±% p.a.
1980	1,273	+0.04%
1990	1,266	−0.06%
2000	1,151	−0.95%
2010	1,036	−1.05%
2019	1,108	+0.75%

Note: The municipal borders were changed in 1965 and 2013, causing a significant change in the population.
Source: Statistics Norway and Norwegian Historical Data Centre

== Government ==
While it existed, Jondal Municipality was responsible for primary education (through 10th grade), outpatient health services, senior citizen services, welfare and other social services, zoning, economic development, and municipal roads and utilities. The municipality was governed by a municipal council of directly elected representatives. The mayor was indirectly elected by a vote of the municipal council. The municipality was under the jurisdiction of the Hardanger District Court and the Gulating Court of Appeal.

=== Municipal council ===
The municipal council (Kommunestyre) of Jondal Municipality was made up of 17 representatives that were elected to four year terms. The tables below show the historical composition of the council by political party.

Jondal kommunestyre 2015–2019
Party name (in Nynorsk)	Number of representatives
Labour Party (Arbeidarpartiet)	4
Conservative Party (Høgre)	3
Christian Democratic Party (Kristeleg Folkeparti)	2
Centre Party (Senterpartiet)	8
Total number of members:	17
Note: On 1 January 2020, Jondal Municipality, Odda Municipality, and Ullensvang Municipality were merged to form the new Ullensvang Municipality.

Jondal kommunestyre 2011–2015
Party name (in Nynorsk)	Number of representatives
Labour Party (Arbeidarpartiet)	4
Conservative Party (Høgre)	2
Christian Democratic Party (Kristeleg Folkeparti)	2
Centre Party (Senterpartiet)	9
Total number of members:	17

Jondal kommunestyre 2007–2011
Party name (in Nynorsk)	Number of representatives
Labour Party (Arbeidarpartiet)	5
Conservative Party (Høgre)	2
Christian Democratic Party (Kristeleg Folkeparti)	3
Centre Party (Senterpartiet)	7
Total number of members:	17

Jondal kommunestyre 2003–2007
Party name (in Nynorsk)	Number of representatives
Labour Party (Arbeidarpartiet)	7
Conservative Party (Høgre)	2
Christian Democratic Party (Kristeleg Folkeparti)	3
Centre Party (Senterpartiet)	5
Total number of members:	17

Jondal kommunestyre 1999–2003
Party name (in Nynorsk)	Number of representatives
Labour Party (Arbeidarpartiet)	5
Progress Party (Framstegspartiet)	1
Conservative Party (Høgre)	2
Christian Democratic Party (Kristeleg Folkeparti)	3
Centre Party (Senterpartiet)	5
Liberal Party (Venstre)	1
Total number of members:	17

Jondal kommunestyre 1995–1999
Party name (in Nynorsk)	Number of representatives
Labour Party (Arbeidarpartiet)	5
Conservative Party (Høgre)	2
Christian Democratic Party (Kristeleg Folkeparti)	3
Centre Party (Senterpartiet)	5
Liberal Party (Venstre)	2
Total number of members:	17

Jondal kommunestyre 1991–1995
Party name (in Nynorsk)	Number of representatives
Labour Party (Arbeidarpartiet)	3
Conservative Party (Høgre)	3
Christian Democratic Party (Kristeleg Folkeparti)	4
Centre Party (Senterpartiet)	5
Liberal Party (Venstre)	2
Total number of members:	17

Jondal kommunestyre 1987–1991
Party name (in Nynorsk)	Number of representatives
Labour Party (Arbeidarpartiet)	3
Conservative Party (Høgre)	4
Christian Democratic Party (Kristeleg Folkeparti)	4
Centre Party (Senterpartiet)	4
Liberal Party (Venstre)	2
Total number of members:	17

Jondal kommunestyre 1983–1987
Party name (in Nynorsk)	Number of representatives
Labour Party (Arbeidarpartiet)	3
Conservative Party (Høgre)	3
Christian Democratic Party (Kristeleg Folkeparti)	5
Centre Party (Senterpartiet)	4
Liberal Party (Venstre)	2
Total number of members:	17

Jondal kommunestyre 1979–1983
Party name (in Nynorsk)	Number of representatives
Labour Party (Arbeidarpartiet)	2
Conservative Party (Høgre)	3
Christian Democratic Party (Kristeleg Folkeparti)	6
Centre Party (Senterpartiet)	4
Liberal Party (Venstre)	2
Total number of members:	17

Jondal kommunestyre 1975–1979
Party name (in Nynorsk)	Number of representatives
Labour Party (Arbeidarpartiet)	3
Conservative Party (Høgre)	2
Christian Democratic Party (Kristeleg Folkeparti)	6
Centre Party (Senterpartiet)	4
Non-party common list (Upolitisk Samlingsliste)	2
Total number of members:	17

Jondal kommunestyre 1971–1975
Party name (in Nynorsk)	Number of representatives
Labour Party (Arbeidarpartiet)	2
Local List(s) (Lokale lister)	11
Total number of members:	13

Jondal kommunestyre 1967–1971
Party name (in Nynorsk)	Number of representatives
Local List(s) (Lokale lister)	13
Total number of members:	13

Jondal kommunestyre 1964–1967
Party name (in Nynorsk)	Number of representatives
Local List(s) (Lokale lister)	17
Total number of members:	17

Jondal heradsstyre 1959–1963
Party name (in Nynorsk)	Number of representatives
Local List(s) (Lokale lister)	17
Total number of members:	17

Jondal heradsstyre 1955–1959
Party name (in Nynorsk)	Number of representatives
List of workers, fishermen, and small farmholders (Arbeidarar, fiskarar, småbrukarar liste)	2
Local List(s) (Lokale lister)	15
Total number of members:	17

Jondal heradsstyre 1951–1955
Party name (in Nynorsk)	Number of representatives
Liberal Party (Venstre)	2
Local List(s) (Lokale lister)	14
Total number of members:	16

Jondal heradsstyre 1947–1951
Party name (in Nynorsk)	Number of representatives
Local List(s) (Lokale lister)	16
Total number of members:	16

Jondal heradsstyre 1945–1947
Party name (in Nynorsk)	Number of representatives
Labour Party (Arbeidarpartiet)	6
Local List(s) (Lokale lister)	10
Total number of members:	16

Jondal heradsstyre 1937–1941*
Party name (in Nynorsk)	Number of representatives
Farmers' Party (Bondepartiet)	4
Local List(s) (Lokale lister)	12
Total number of members:	16
Note: Due to the German occupation of Norway during World War II, no elections were held for new municipal councils until after the war ended in 1945.

=== Mayors ===
The mayor (Nynorsk: ordførar) of Jondal Municipality was the political leader of the municipality and the chairperson of the municipal council. The following people have held this position:

- 1863–1865: Hans Galtung
- 1866–1875: Ole Evensen Vadsæl
- 1876–1879: Jens Galtung
- 1880–1889: Mikkel Digrebrække
- 1890–1898: Lars Berge
- 1899–1904: Samson Haugen
- 1905–1916: Lars Storaas
- 1917–1919: Lars Eide
- 1920–1934: Hans Halleråker
- 1935–1937: Ola N. Heradstveit
- 1937–1946: Olaf L. Håheim
- 1946–1947: Johannes S. Bakke
- 1947–1951: Theodor Sandven (LL)
- 1951–1967: Johannes S. Bakke (Sp)
- 1967–1975: Lars Vetlesand (LL)
- 1975–1979: Leif Galtung (Sp)
- 1979–1995: Bjørg Hope Galtung (Sp)
- 1995–2007: John Skogseth (Ap)
- 2007–2009: Sigrid Brattabø Handegard (Sp)
- 2009–2019: Jon Larsgard (Sp)

=== Police ===
In 2016, the chief of police for Vestlandet formally suggested a reconfiguration of police districts and stations. He proposed that the police station in Jondal be closed.

== Notable people ==
- Herborg Kråkevik, a singer and actress
- Bjørg Hope Galtung, the mayor of Jondal Municipality from 1979 to 1993 (only leaving to sit in the national Parliament)

== See also ==
- List of former municipalities of Norway
