= Sunndal, Vestland =

Village in Kvinnherad Municipality, Norway

Sunndal Sundal
- Village
- Interactive map of Sunndal
- Coordinates: 60.11749°N 6.26784°E
- Country: Norway
- Region: Western Norway
- County: Vestland
- District: Sunnhordland
- Municipality: Kvinnherad Municipality
- Elevation: 6 m (20 ft)
- Time zone: UTC+01:00 (CET)
  - Summer (DST): UTC+02:00 (CEST)
- Post Code: 5476 Mauranger

Sunndal is the largest village in the Mauranger district of Kvinnherad Municipality in Vestland county, Norway. The village is located on the southern shore of the Maurangsfjorden, south of Nordrepollen and Gjetingsdalen. The village of Austrepollen lies to the east of Sunndal. It sits in a deep valley, with steep mountains surrounding it on three sides. The Bondhusbrea glacier is located at the southern end of the valley.

The village has been a centre of tourism for over 150 years. There are about 70 inhabitants in the village, which has a camping ground, a shop, and an inn. At the end of the 19th century, German and English tourists travelled to Sunndal to experience the great nature including the nearby Folgefonna glacier, and the small Bondhusbreen arm which reaches into the valley towards Sunndal. Today, the nearby Folgefonna National Park is a major draw to the area which is popular among outdoor enthusiasts.

== Media gallery ==
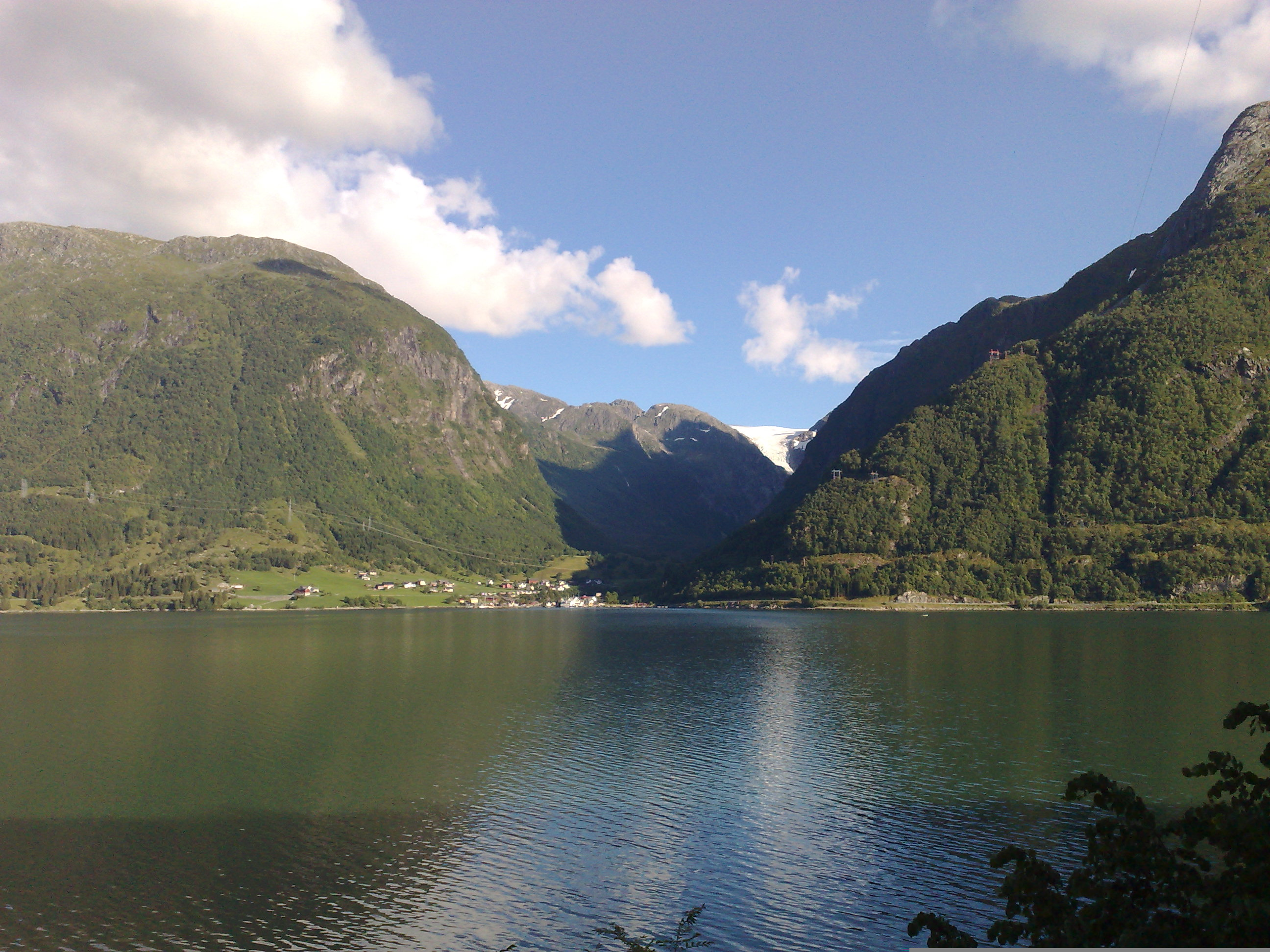
View of the village

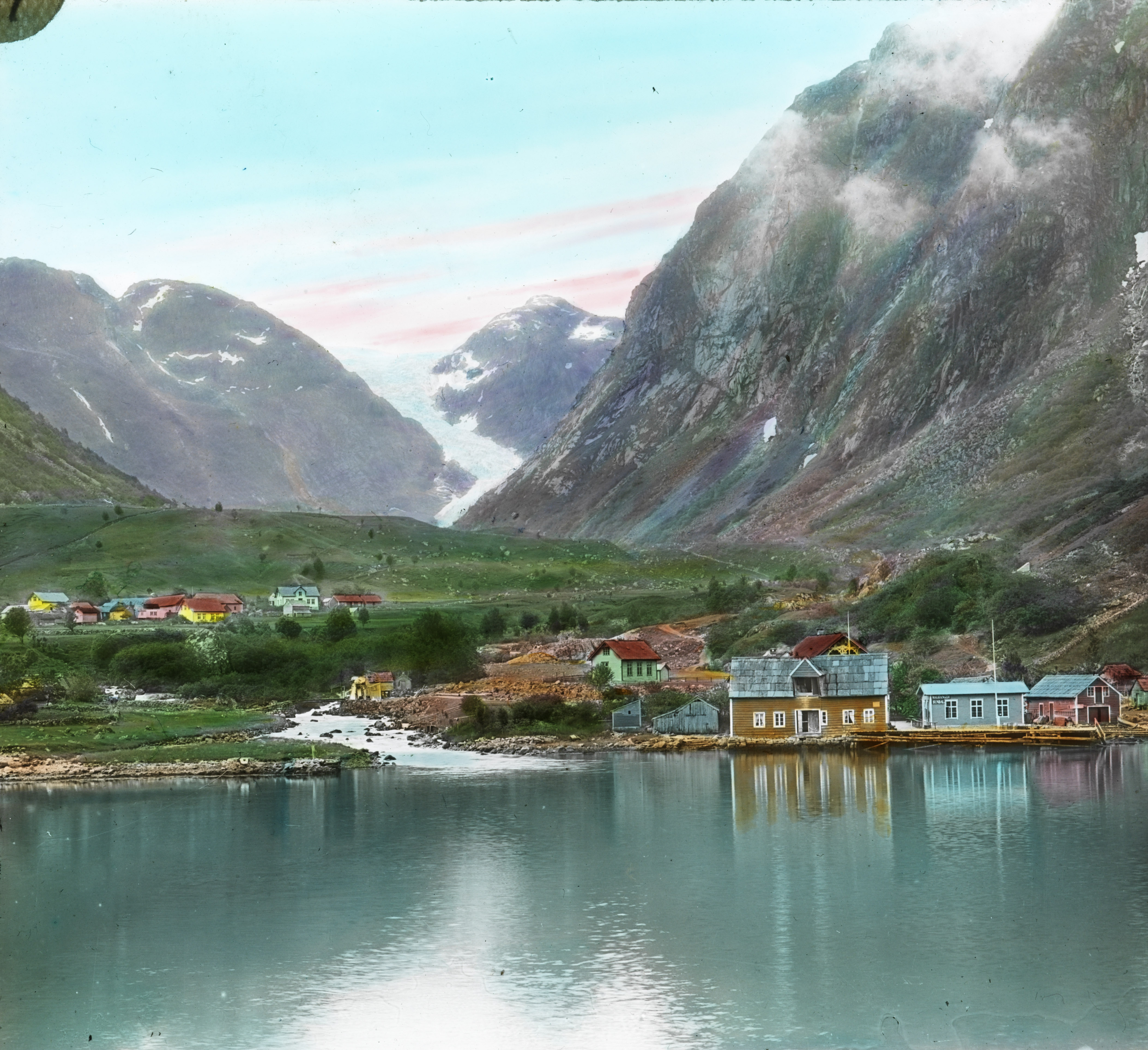
Sundal, circa 1910

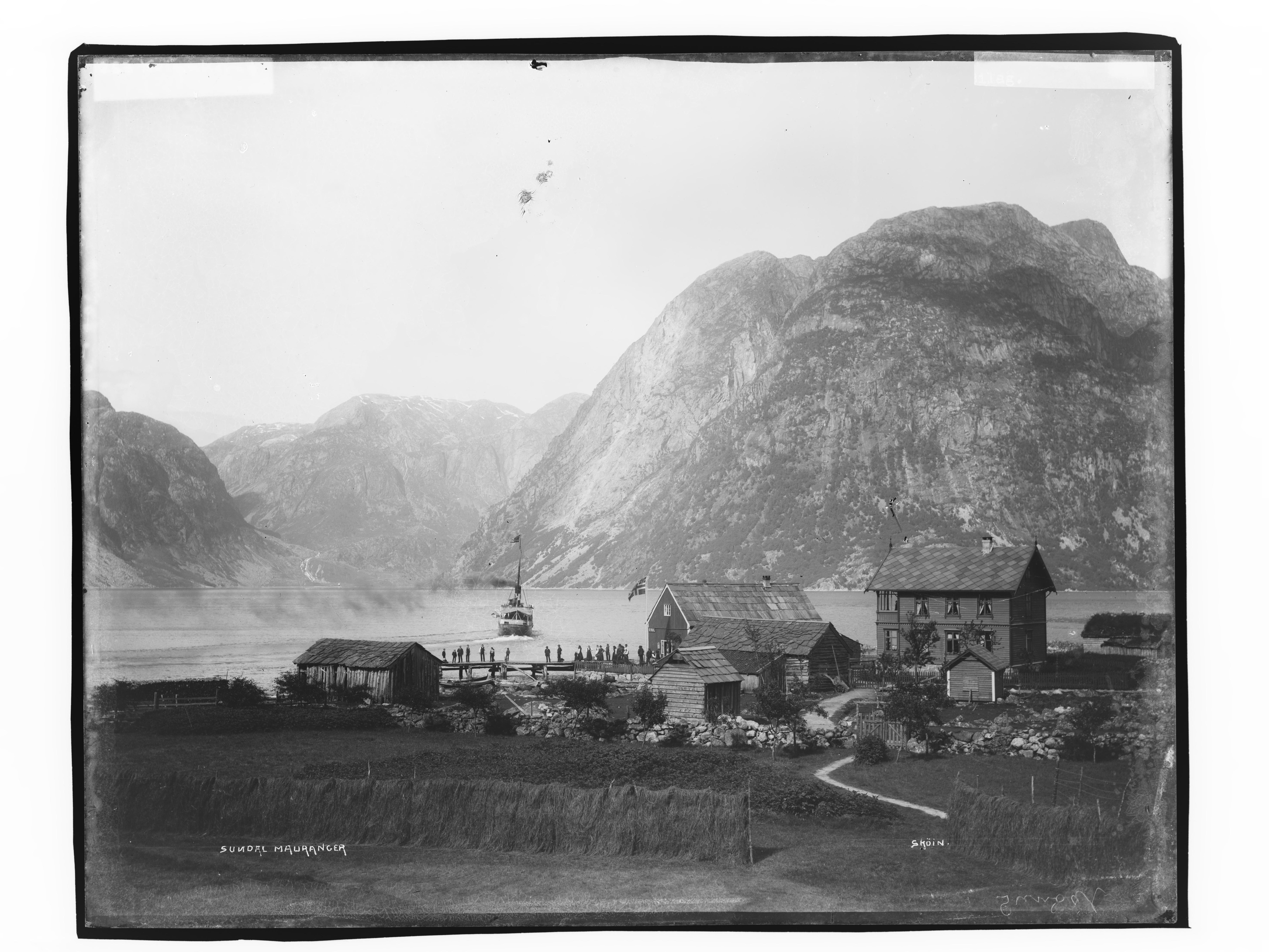
Sundal harbour, circa 1880–1910
