= Gjetingsdalen =

Village in Kvinnherad Municipality, Norway

- Village
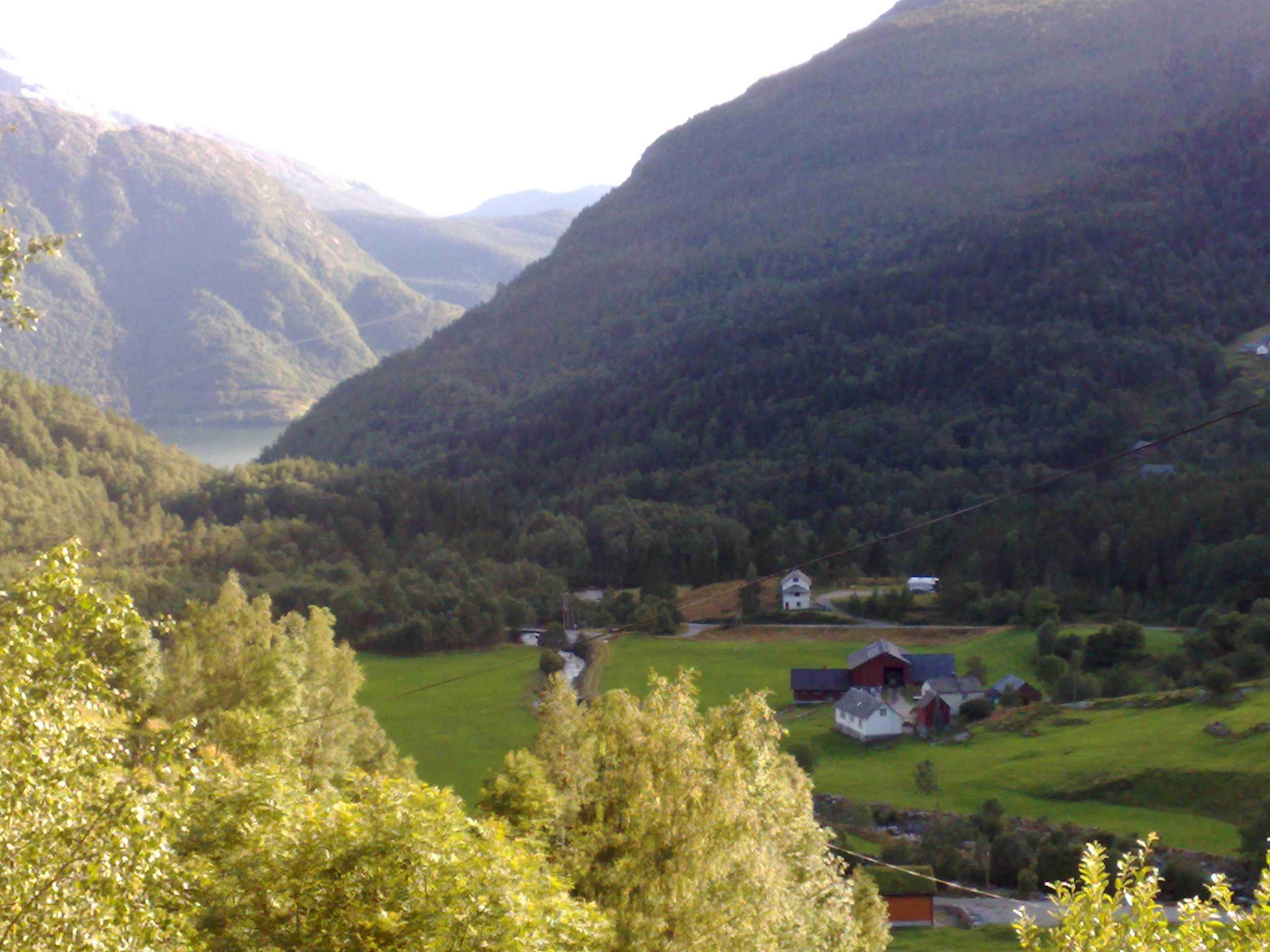
- View of the village area
- Interactive map of Gjetingsdalen
- Coordinates: 60.13645°N 6.23667°E
- Country: Norway
- Region: Western Norway
- County: Vestland
- District: Sunnhordland
- Municipality: Kvinnherad Municipality
- Elevation: 165 m (541 ft)
- Time zone: UTC+01:00 (CET)
  - Summer (DST): UTC+02:00 (CEST)
- Post Code: 5476 Mauranger

Gjetingsdalen is a village in the Mauranger area of Kvinnherad Municipality in Vestland county, Norway. The village is located in the Gjetingsdalen valley, on a hillside overlooking the Maurangsfjorden. The village of Austrepollen lies about 5 kilometres (3.1 mi) to the east, across the fjord. There is only one road leading into and out of the village (from the village of Nordrepollen), making it rather isolated, but its close proximity to the Jondal Tunnel and Folgefonna Tunnel, give it good access to nearby urban areas. There is a hydroelectric power plant located along the river which runs through this valley.

The village is made up of several small farms. The Bakka farm is located in the top of the valley and it has great grazing pastures. This farm has about 36 head of cattle, giving it the highest milk production in the village. This farm also has a tourist guesthouse called Bolebua. Other farms in the village area include Medhus, Bråtun, and Øyjorda.
