= Svartis Tunnel =

Road tunnel in Nordland county, Norway

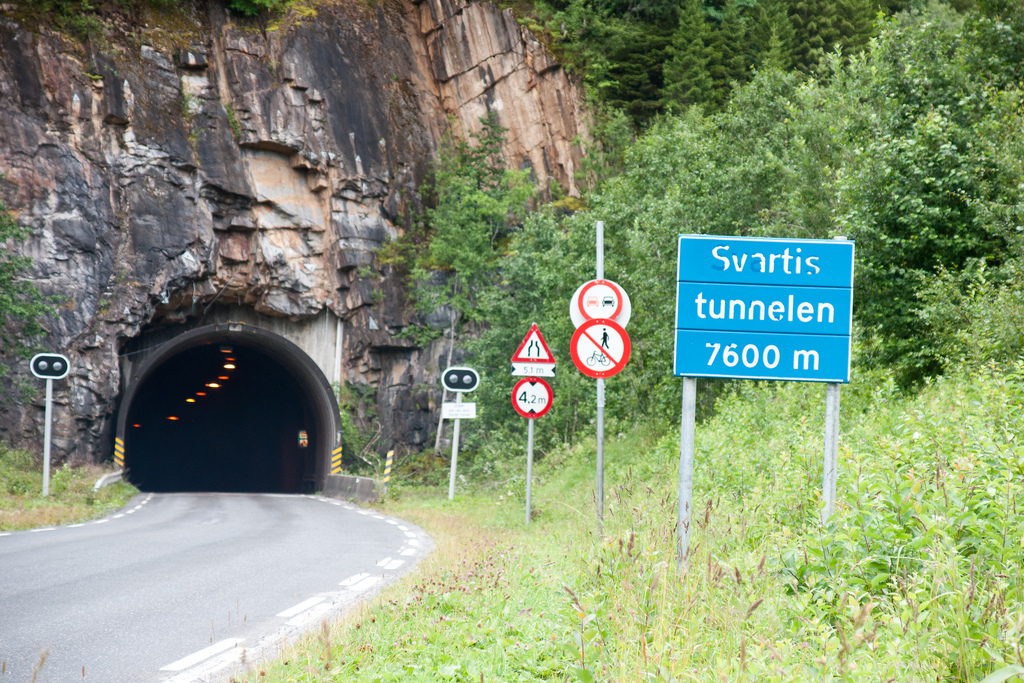
- The southwest entrance to the Svartis Tunnel
- Interactive map of Svartis Tunnel

Overview
- Location: Meløy Municipality, Norway
- Coordinates: 66.7672°N 13.9597°E

Operation
- Opened: 16 October 1986

Technical
- Length: 7,624 metres (4.737 mi)
- Tunnel clearance: 4.2 metres (14 ft)
- Width: 5 metres (16 ft)

Svartis Tunnel (Norwegian: Svartistunnelen) is a road tunnel in Meløy Municipality in Nordland county, Norway. The tunnel is part of Norwegian County Road 17. The 7,614-metre (24,980 ft) long tunnel opened in 1986, and it stretches between Kilvik and Fykanvatnet under part of the Svartisen glacier.

The Svartis Tunnel is closed to pedestrians and cyclists due to the danger of exhaust in the tunnel. The alternative route for cyclists is the ferry between Vassdalsvik and Ørnes. The ferry route was part of County Road 17 prior to the tunnel being opened.

The Svartis Tunnel was Norway's longest road tunnel, and the longest in Northern Europe, at the time it was opened. Today it is the fourth-longest tunnel in Nordland county (after Toven Tunnel, Korgfjell Tunnel, and Steigen Tunnel).

The tunnel was the first in Norway to be made with the use of a tunnel boring machine with a diameter of 6.25 metres (20.5 ft). This makes it too narrow to have a center line.

Similar to many other tunnels in Norway, the Svartis Tunnel is plagued by condensation. This can lead to dangerous situations when vehicles' windshields suddenly fog when entering a tunnel.

== See also ==
- List of tunnels in Norway
- List of subsea tunnels in Norway
