= Austrepollen =

Village in Kvinnherad Municipality, Norway

- Village
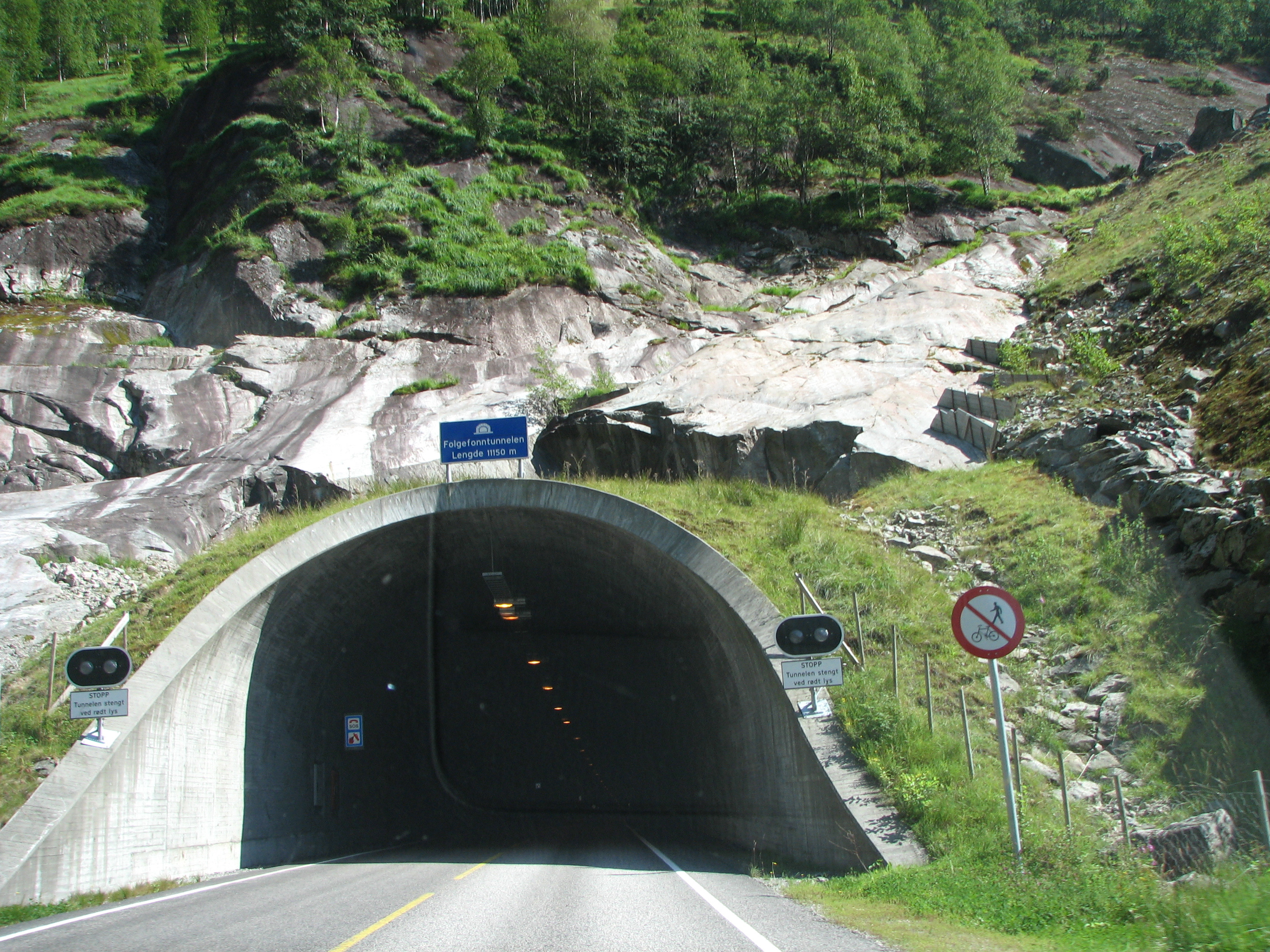
- View of the Folgefonna Tunnel seen from Austrepollen
- Interactive map of Austrepollen
- Coordinates: 60.13126°N 6.32444°E
- Country: Norway
- Region: Western Norway
- County: Vestland
- District: Sunnhordland
- Municipality: Kvinnherad Municipality
- Elevation: 22 m (72 ft)
- Time zone: UTC+01:00 (CET)
  - Summer (DST): UTC+02:00 (CEST)
- Post Code: 5476 Mauranger

Austrepollen is a village in the Mauranger area of Kvinnherad Municipality in Vestland county, Norway. The village is located at the end of the Maurangsfjorden, about 5 kilometres (3.1 mi) east of the village of Gjetingsdalen and about 3 kilometres (1.9 mi) northeast of the village of Sunndal. The western end of the Folgefonna Tunnel is located in Austrepollen, taking it from an isolated rural village before the opening of the tunnel, to a village along a main regional highway. The village of Nordrepollen and the Jondal Tunnel are located just a short distance to the northwest. The Mauranger power station is also located in the village.
