= Handegard =

Handegard is a surname. Notable people with the surname include:

- John Handegard (born 1938), American ten-pin bowler
- Sigrid Brattabø Handegard (born 1963), Norwegian politician
- Jake Handegard, American Director
