= Juklavatnet =

Lake in Vestland, Norway

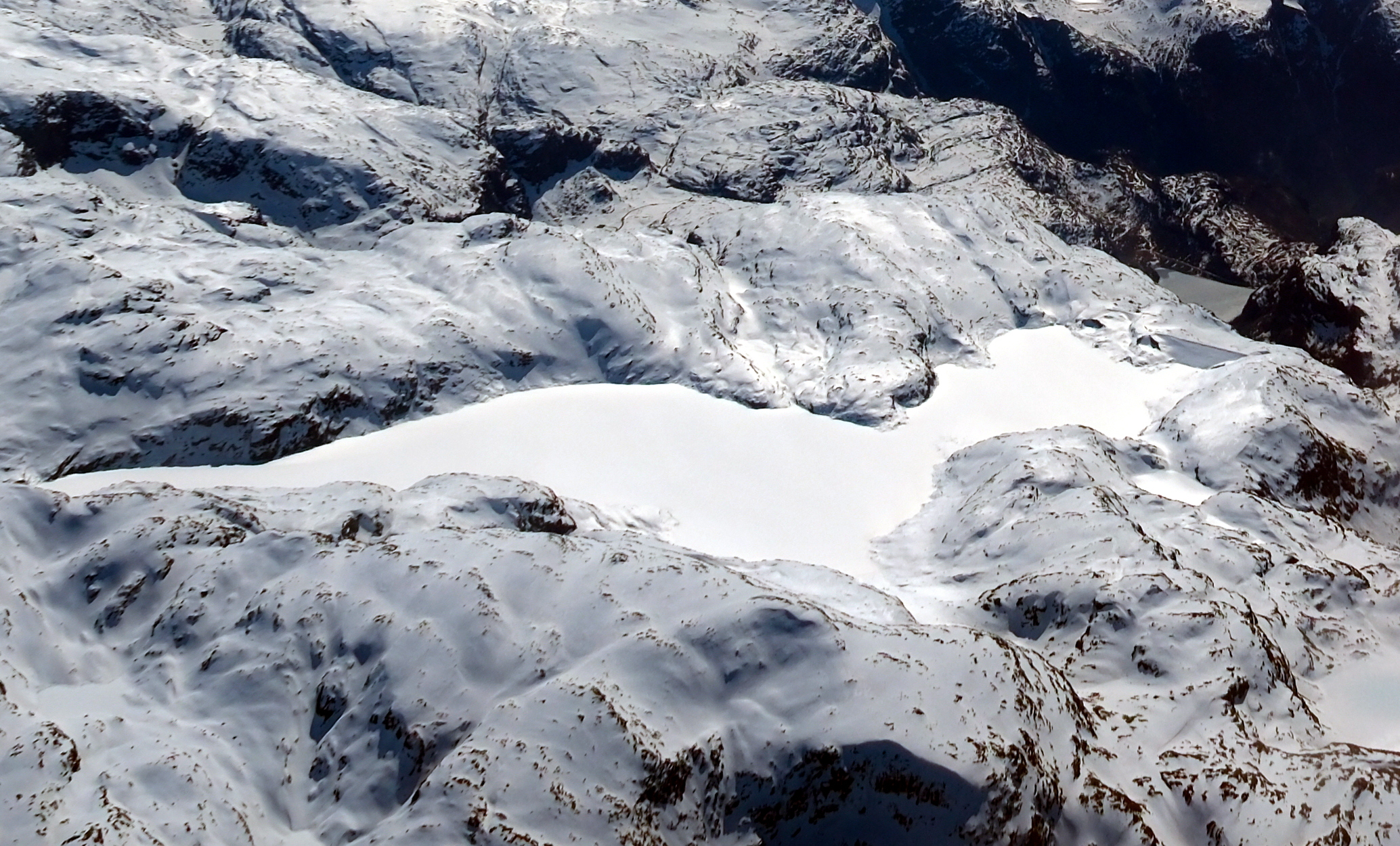
- Interactive map of Juklavatnet
- Location: Ullensvang and Kvinnherad, Vestland
- Coordinates: 60.2139°N 6.3784°E
- Basin countries: Norway
- Max. length: 4 kilometres (2.5 mi)
- Max. width: 2 kilometres (1.2 mi)
- Surface area: 3.61 km^{2} (1.39 sq mi)
- Shore length^{1}: 12.24 kilometres (7.61 mi)
- Surface elevation: 1,060 metres (3,480 ft)
- References: NVE
- ^{1} Shore length is not a well-defined measure.

Juklavatnet is a lake on the border of Kvinnherad Municipality and Ullensvang Municipality in Vestland county, Norway. The 3.61-square-kilometre (1.39 sq mi) lake lies just outside Folgefonna National Park and immediately to the west of the Nordre Folgefonna glacier. The only road access comes from the small village of Nordrepollen in the Mauranger area of Kvinnherad municipality, about 10 kilometres (6.2 mi) south of the lake. There is a dam on the western end of the lake which regulates the depth of the water so that it can be used for hydroelectric power generation. The lake is the largest reservoir that feeds into the Mauranger power station.

== See also ==
- List of lakes in Norway
