= Bjørg Hope Galtung =

Norwegian politician (born 1942)

Bjørg Hope Galtung (born 13 September 1942 in Bremanger Municipality) is a Norwegian politician for the Centre Party.

She was elected to the Norwegian Parliament from Hordaland in 1993, but was not re-elected in 1997. She served in the position of deputy representative during the terms 1981–1985 and 1997–2001.

Galtung served as mayor of Jondal Municipality from 1979 to 1993. In 1983–1987 she was also a deputy member of Hordaland county council.
