= Sigrid Brattabø Handegard =

Norwegian politician (born 1963)

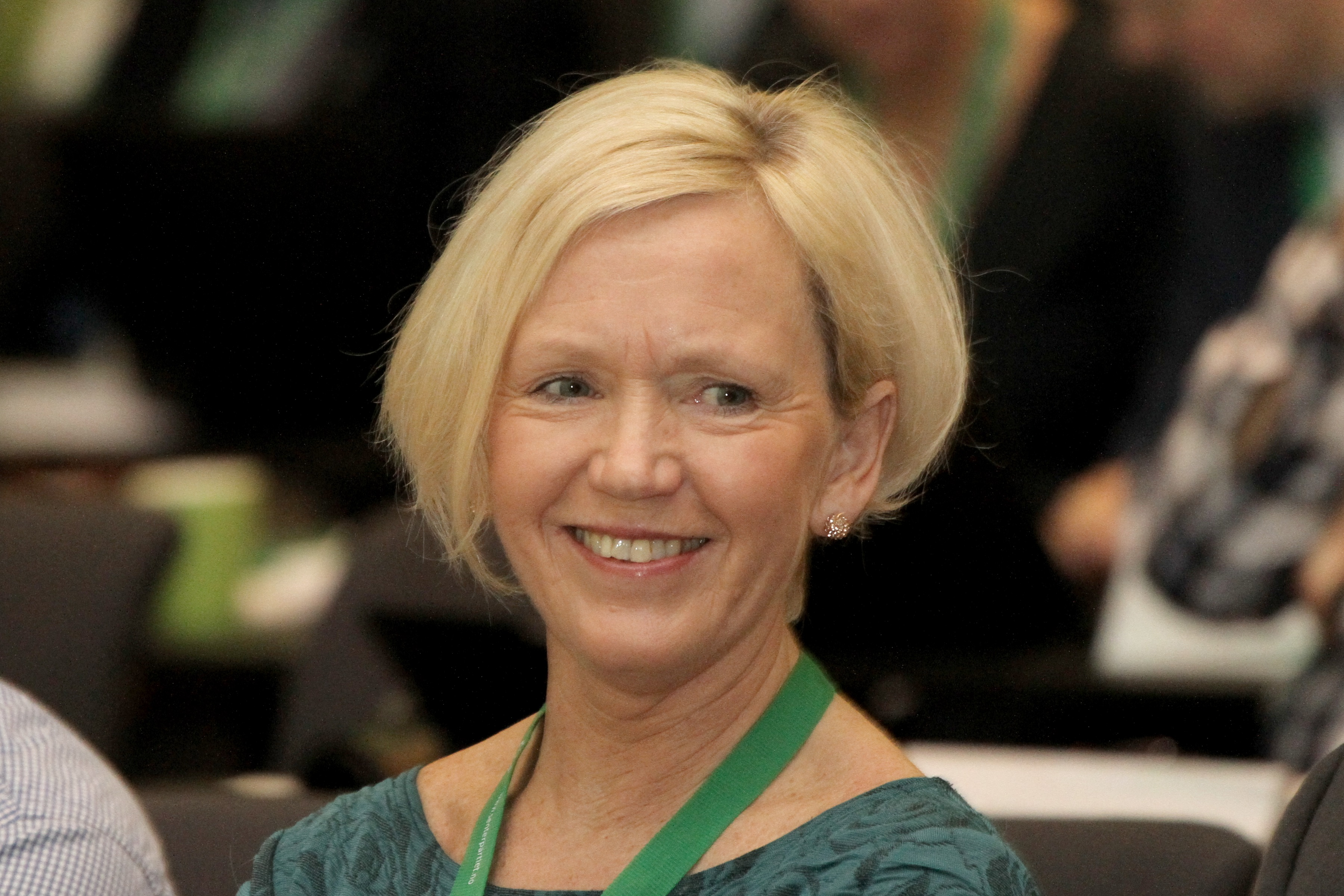
Sigrid Brattabø Handegard

Sigrid Brattabø Handegard (born 27 December 1963) is a Norwegian politician for the Centre Party.

== Early life ==
Handegard was educated at Rogne Upper Secondary School, specialising in nursing auxiliary skills.

She worked as a nursing auxiliary in Jondal and Vikevollen between 1981 and 2007.

== Elected office ==
Handegard was deputy mayor of Jondal Municipality 1995-2007, then Mayor 2007-2009. From 2000-2002 she was Vice-chair of the Hordaland branch of the Centre Party then Chair 2002-2008. Handegard served as a deputy representative to the Norwegian Parliament from Hordaland 2005 - 2009.

== Later career ==
Since 2009, Handegard has been a political advisor to the Minister of Transport and Communications, Magnhild Meltveit Kleppa.

Handegard is married with three children.
