= Kysnesstranda =

Village in Ullensvang Municipality, Norway

Kysnesstranda Kysnesstrondi
- Village
- Interactive map of Kysnesstranda
- Coordinates: 60.20438°N 6.11362°E
- Country: Norway
- Region: Western Norway
- County: Vestland
- District: Hardanger
- Municipality: Ullensvang Municipality
- Elevation: 20 m (66 ft)
- Time zone: UTC+01:00 (CET)
  - Summer (DST): UTC+02:00 (CEST)
- Post Code: 5626 Kysnesstrand

Kysnesstranda is a village in the Ullensvang Municipality in Vestland county, Norway. The village lies along the southern shore of the Hardangerfjorden. The village lies about 15 kilometres (9.3 mi) south of the village of Jondal.

== History ==
Kysnesstranda was historically part of the old Strandebarm Municipality. Strandebarm Municipality included territory on both sides of the Hardangerfjorden. In 1863, the most of Strandebarm Municipality located east of the fjord was separated from Strandebarm to create the new Jondal Municipality; however, the village of Kysnesstranda and the area surrounding it remained a part of Strandebarm Municipality despite its location on the east side of the fjord. On 1 January 1964, when Strandebarm Municipality was merged into the neighboring Kvam Municipality, the Kysnesstranda area was merged into Jondal Municipality. Kysnesstranda had 100 inhabitants at that time. Then in 2020, all of Jondal Municipality was merged into Ullensvang Municipality.
