= Jondalen Church =

Church in Buskerud, Norway

- Jondalen kirke
- View of the church
- Jondalen Church
- 59°42′14″N 9°30′51″E
- Location: Kongsberg, Buskerud
- Country: Norway
- Denomination: Church of Norway
- Churchmanship: Evangelical Lutheran

History
- Status: Parish church
- Founded: 1882
- Consecrated: 11 Oct 1882

Architecture
- Functional status: Active
- Architect: Jacob Wilhelm Nordan
- Architectural type: Long church
- Completed: 1882 (144 years ago)

Specifications
- Capacity: 150
- Materials: Wood

Administration
- Diocese: Tunsberg
- Deanery: Kongsberg prosti
- Parish: Kongsberg og Jondalen
- Norwegian Cultural Heritage Site
- Type: Church
- Status: Not protected
- ID: 84740

Jondalen Church (Norwegian: Jondalen kirke) is a parish church of the Church of Norway in Kongsberg Municipality in Buskerud county, Norway. It is located in the Jondalen valley. It is one of the churches for the Kongsberg og Jondalen parish which is part of the Kongsberg prosti (deanery) in the Diocese of Tunsberg. The white, wooden church was built in a long church design in 1882 using plans drawn up by the architect Jacob Wilhelm Nordan. The church seats about 150 people.

== History ==
In 1861, permission was given to build a church in the Jondalen. The architect was Jacob Wilhelm Nordan and the builder was Gulbrand Johnsen. Construction work did not begin until 1881 and after a year of working, the new church was consecrated on 11 October 1882. The new wooden long church has a rectangular nave and an almost square choir with a sacristy in its extension. There is a church porch on the west end and about in the middle of the nave's ridge is a small bell tower. The church was built of log construction and the outer walls were covered over with paneling in 1899, but inside of the church has unpainted visible log walls. The choir floor is one step higher than the nave floor.

== Media gallery ==
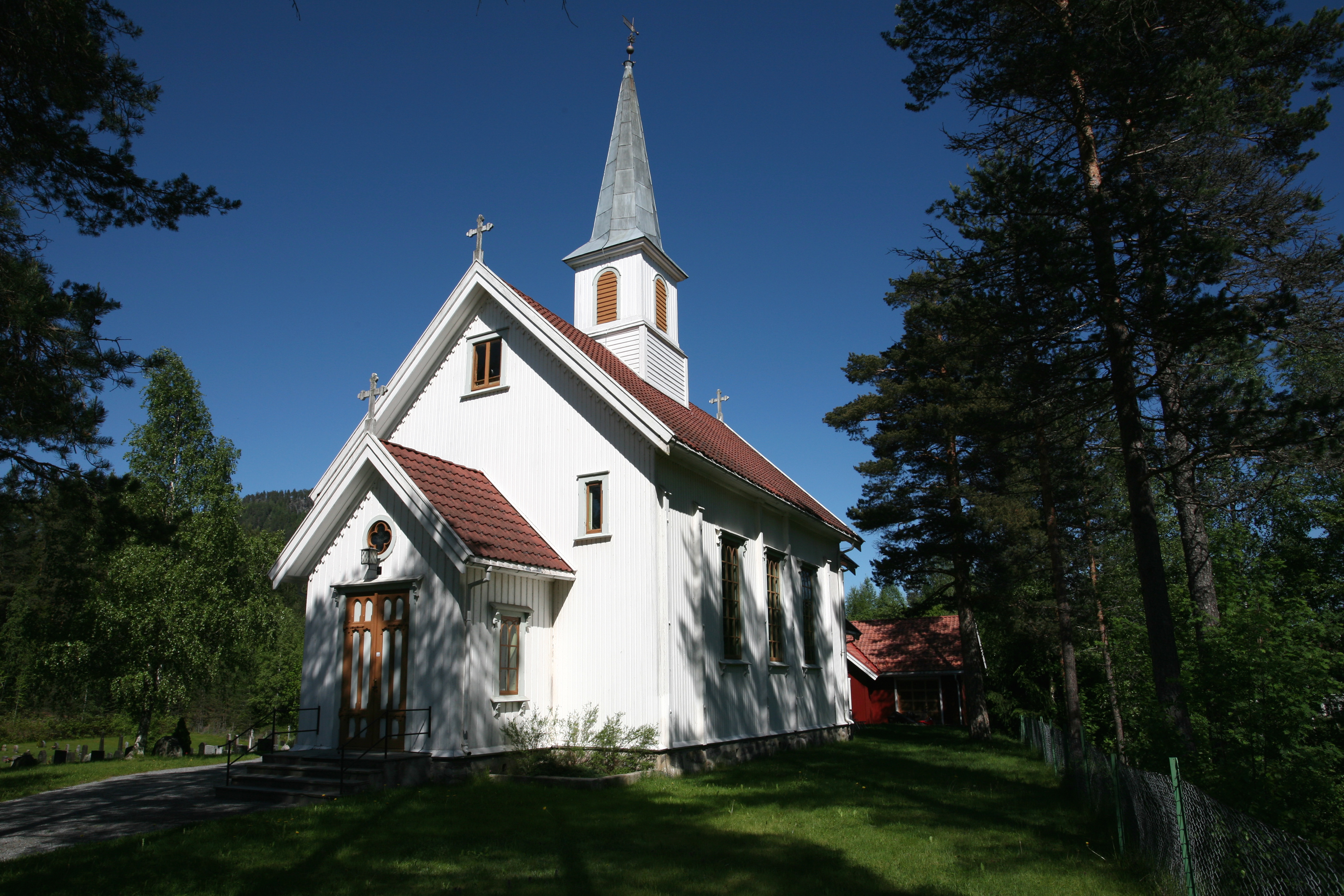

== See also ==
- List of churches in Tunsberg
