= Nordrepollen =

Village in Kvinnherad Municipality, Norway

- Village
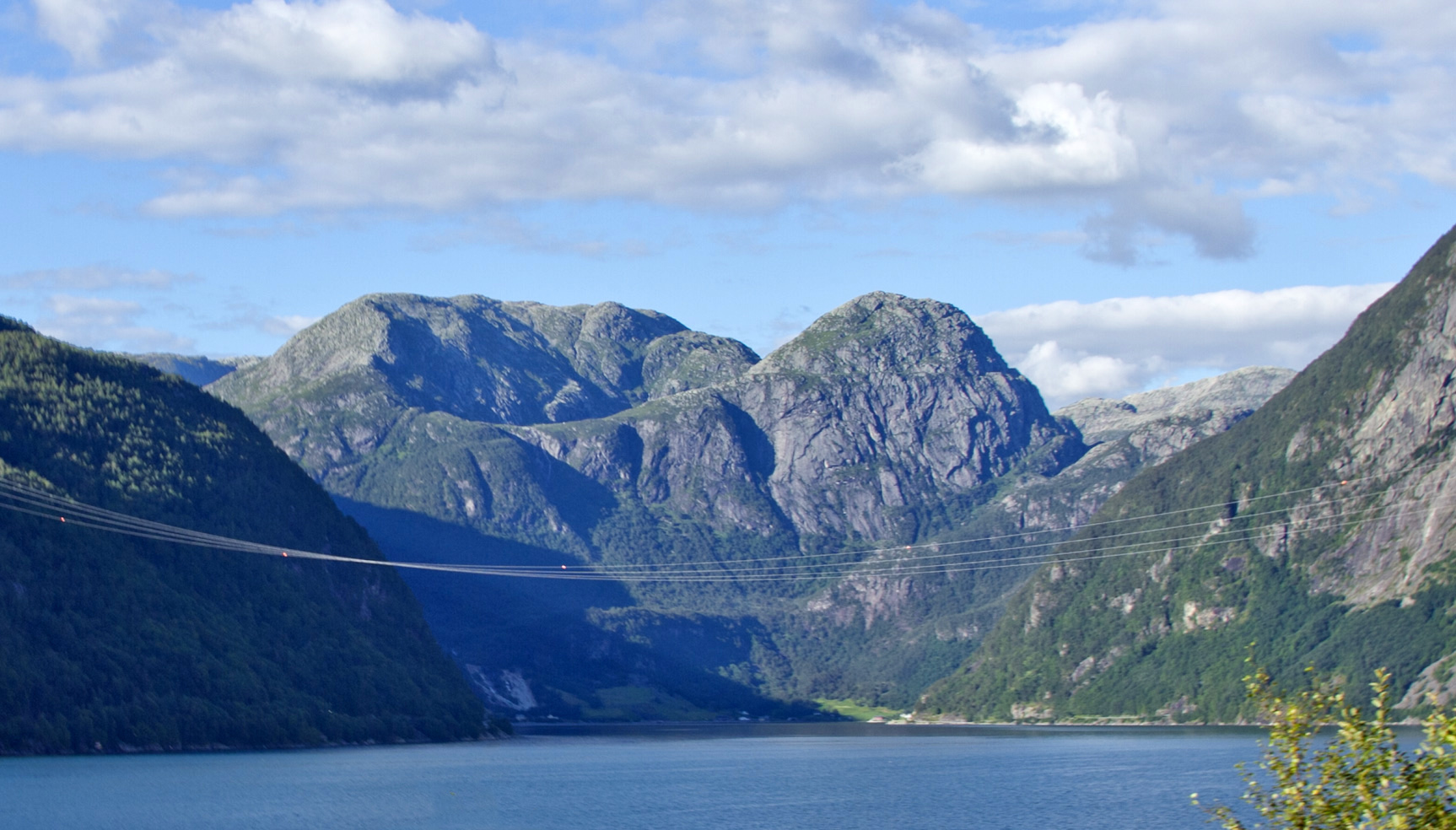
- View of the village
- Interactive map of Nordrepollen
- Coordinates: 60.15948°N 6.29756°E
- Country: Norway
- Region: Western Norway
- County: Vestland
- District: Sunnhordland
- Municipality: Kvinnherad Municipality
- Elevation: 12 m (39 ft)
- Time zone: UTC+01:00 (CET)
  - Summer (DST): UTC+02:00 (CEST)
- Post Code: 5476 Mauranger

Nordrepollen is a village in the Mauranger area of Kvinnherad Municipality in Vestland county, Norway. The village is located at the northern end of the Maurangsfjorden, about half-way between the villages of Gjetingsdalen and Austrepollen. The southeastern entrance to the Jondal Tunnel is located in Nordrepollen. The lake Juklavatnet lies high up in the mountains to the north of Nordrepollen. That lake has a dam at the end, and its water is used to hydroelectric power generation. There are several farms that make up Nordrepollen, the largest of which are Flatebø and Øyre.
