= Mælefjell Tunnel =

Underground road tunnel in Telemark, Norway

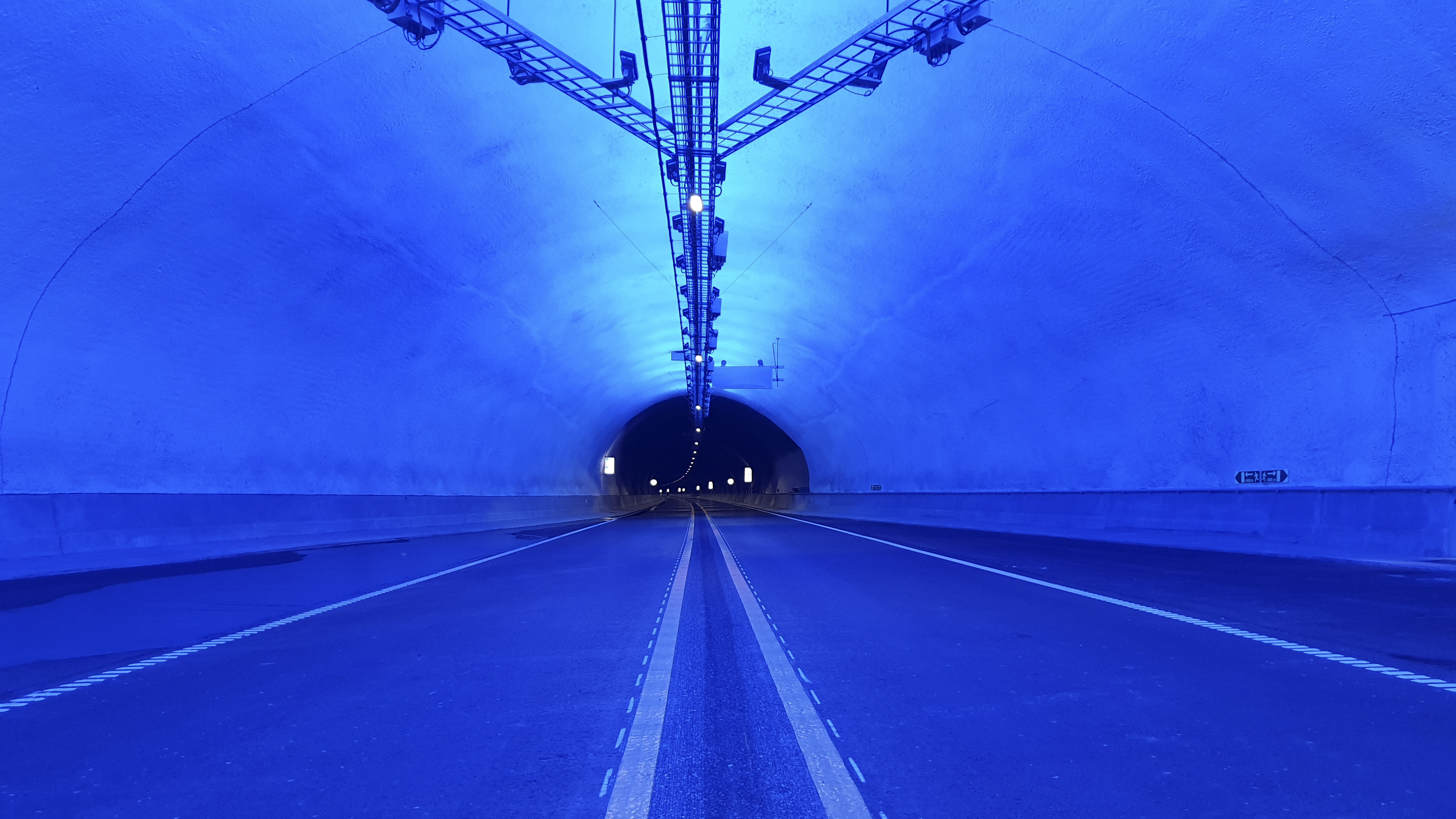
- Hall in the tunnel, December 2019

Overview
- Official name: Mælefjelltunnelen
- Other name: Århus-Gvammen (project)
- Location: Upper Telemark, Telemark, Norway
- Coordinates: 59°33′35″N 08°41′14″E
- Route: E134
- Crosses: Mælefjell
- Start: Århus, Seljord Municipality, Telemark, Norway
- End: Gvammen, Hjartdal Municipality, Telemark, Norway

Operation
- Work began: 2013
- Opened: 19 December 2019
- Owner: Government of Norway
- Operator: Norwegian Public Roads Administration
- Traffic: Automotive
- Character: Rapid transit
- Toll: Free
- Vehicles per day: c. 1700-2750 (Based on 2006 traffic counts)

Technical
- Design engineer: NCC
- Length: 9.355 km (5.813 mi)
- No. of lanes: 2
- Operating speed: 80 km (50 mi)
- Width: 10.5 m (34 ft)

Route map
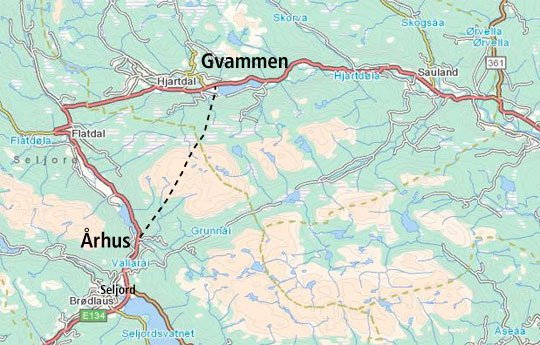
- Route map of the Mælefjell Tunnel

The Mælefjell Tunnel (Norwegian: Mælefjelltunnelen) is a 9.35-kilometre-long (5.81 mi) road tunnel along the European route E134 highway in Telemark county, Norway. The southern end of the tunnel is located at Århus on the north side of the village of Seljord in Seljord Municipality. The northern end of the tunnel is at Gvammen, just east of the village of Hjartdal in Hjartdal Municipality. The tunnel was opened on 19 December 2019, as Norway's seventh longest road tunnel. It is part of the European route E134 highway, and upon its completion, it made the highway about 10 kilometres (6.2 mi) shorter, saving trucks about 18 minutes of driving time between those two places. Construction started in 2013 and the breakthrough occurred on 3 May 2017.

== Background ==
The tunnel was built to shorten the travel time along the European route E134 highway and provide better accessibility especially for heavy vehicles by avoiding the Åsebrekken pass, as well as increasing traffic safety along a congested section of road. The 9,355-metre (30,692 ft) long tunnel passes beneath the mountain Mælefjell. A total of 11.7 kilometres (7.3 mi) of new road was built, replacing 22.6 kilometres (14.0 mi) of the former route through Flatdal. The project was financed by the government of Norway. The total cost was 2 billion kr.

== Media gallery ==
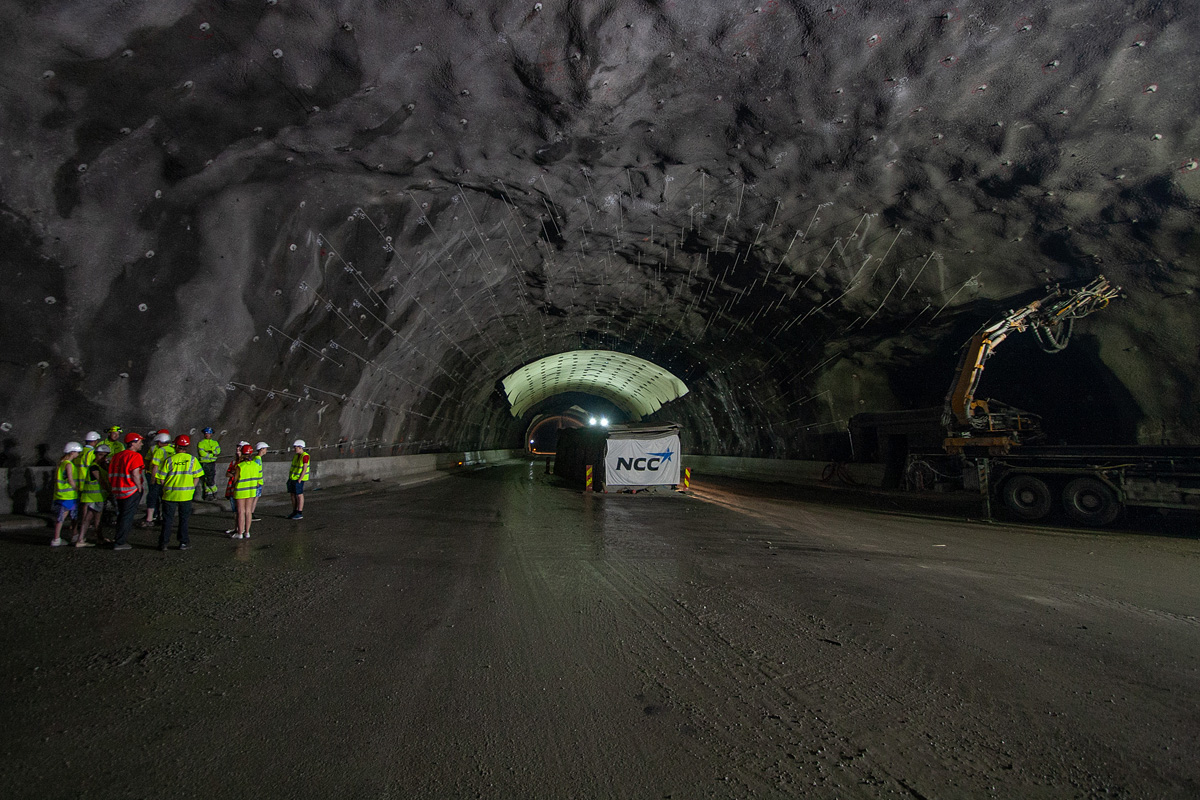

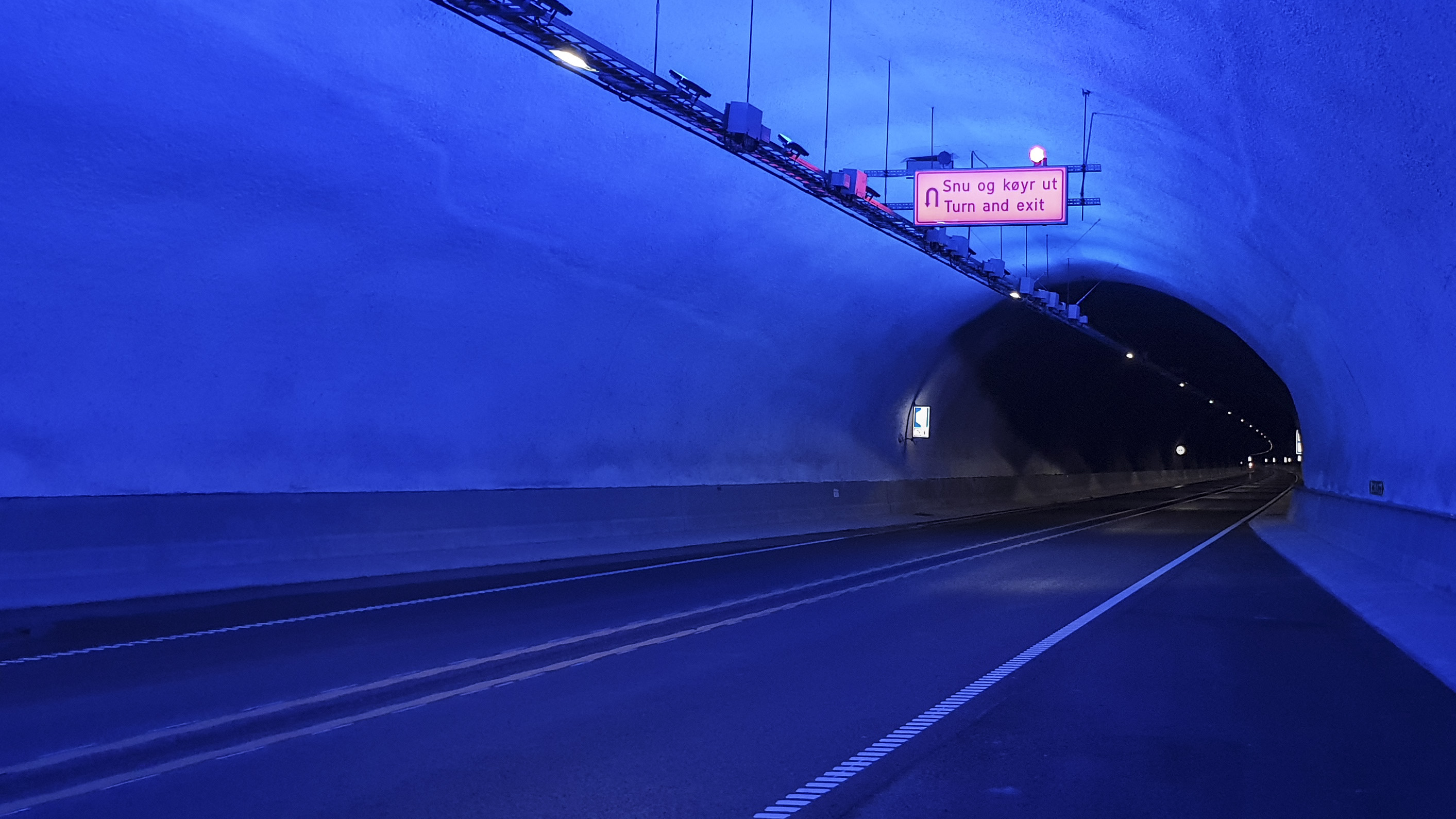

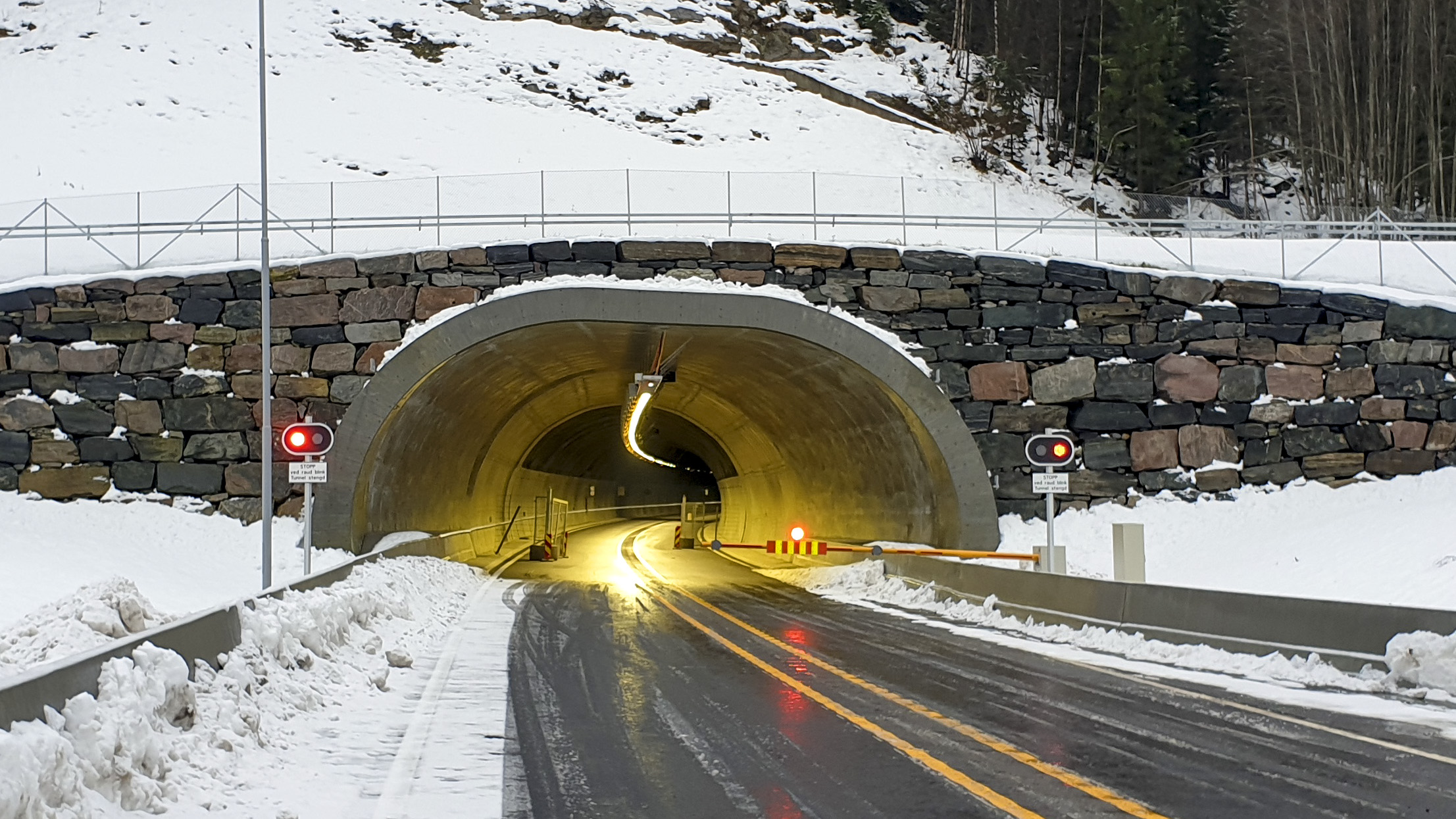
Northern entrance

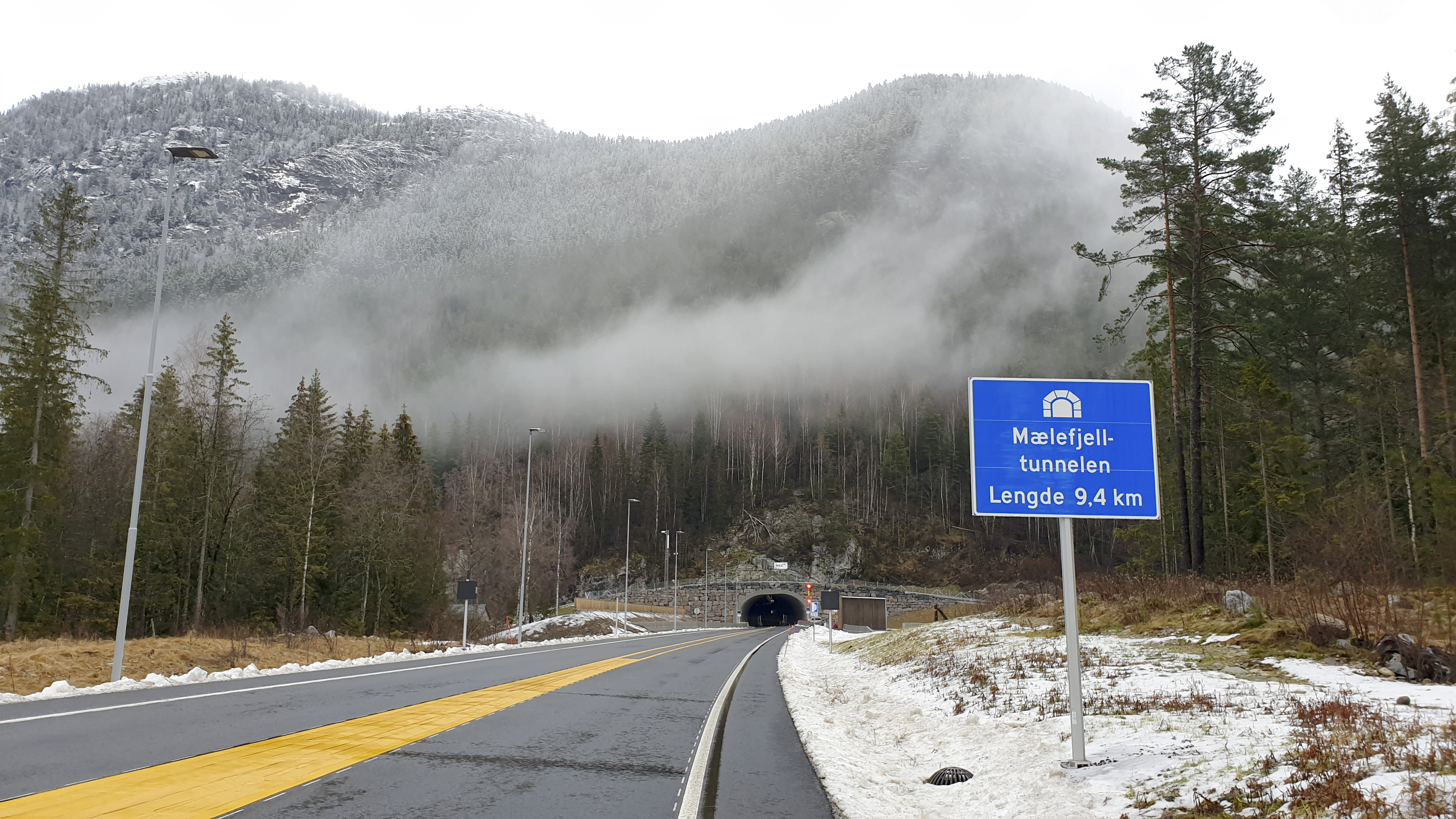
Southern entrance

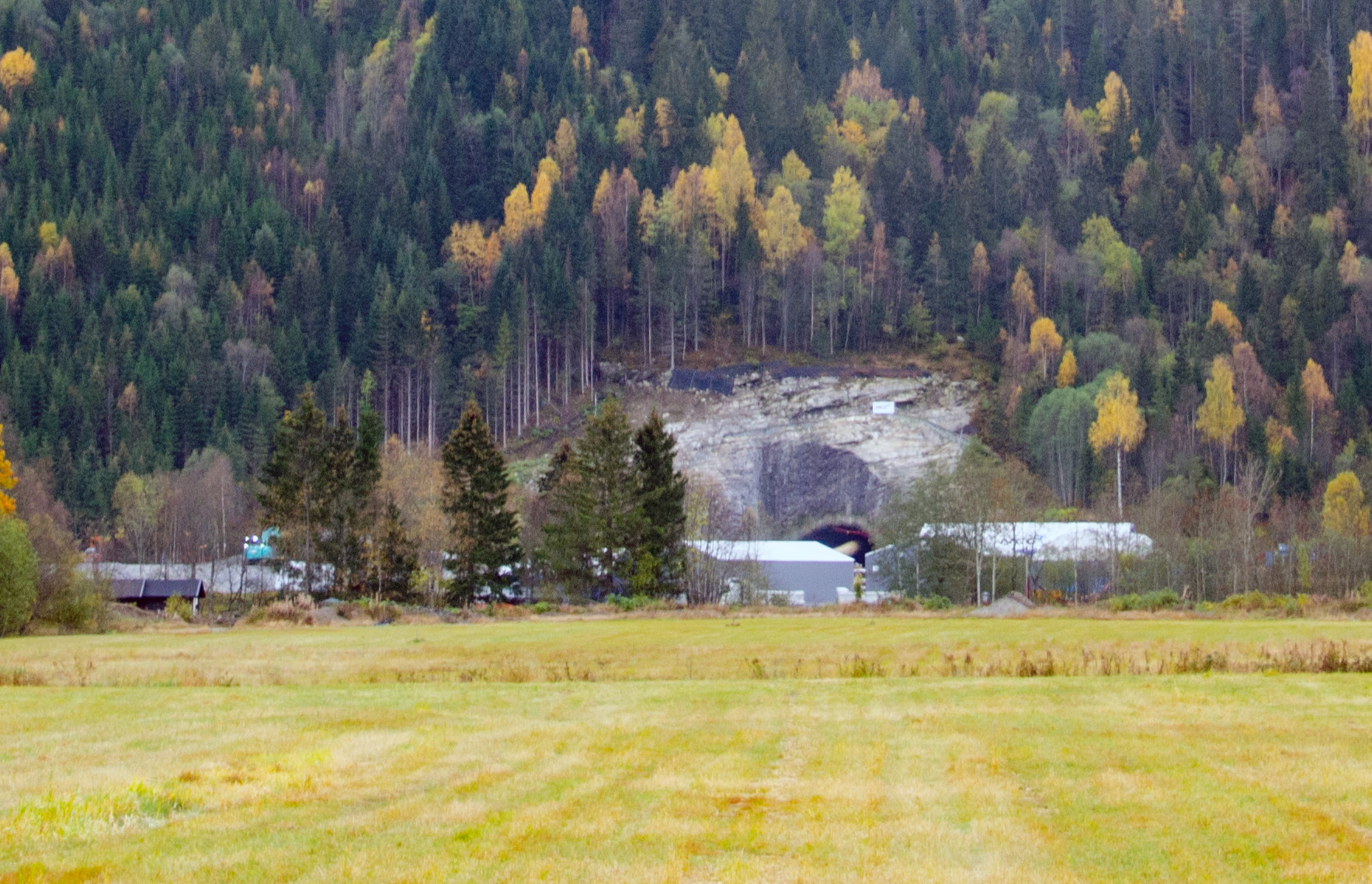
