= Folgefonna Tunnel =

Road tunnel in Norway

Folgefonna Tunnel Folgefonntunnelen
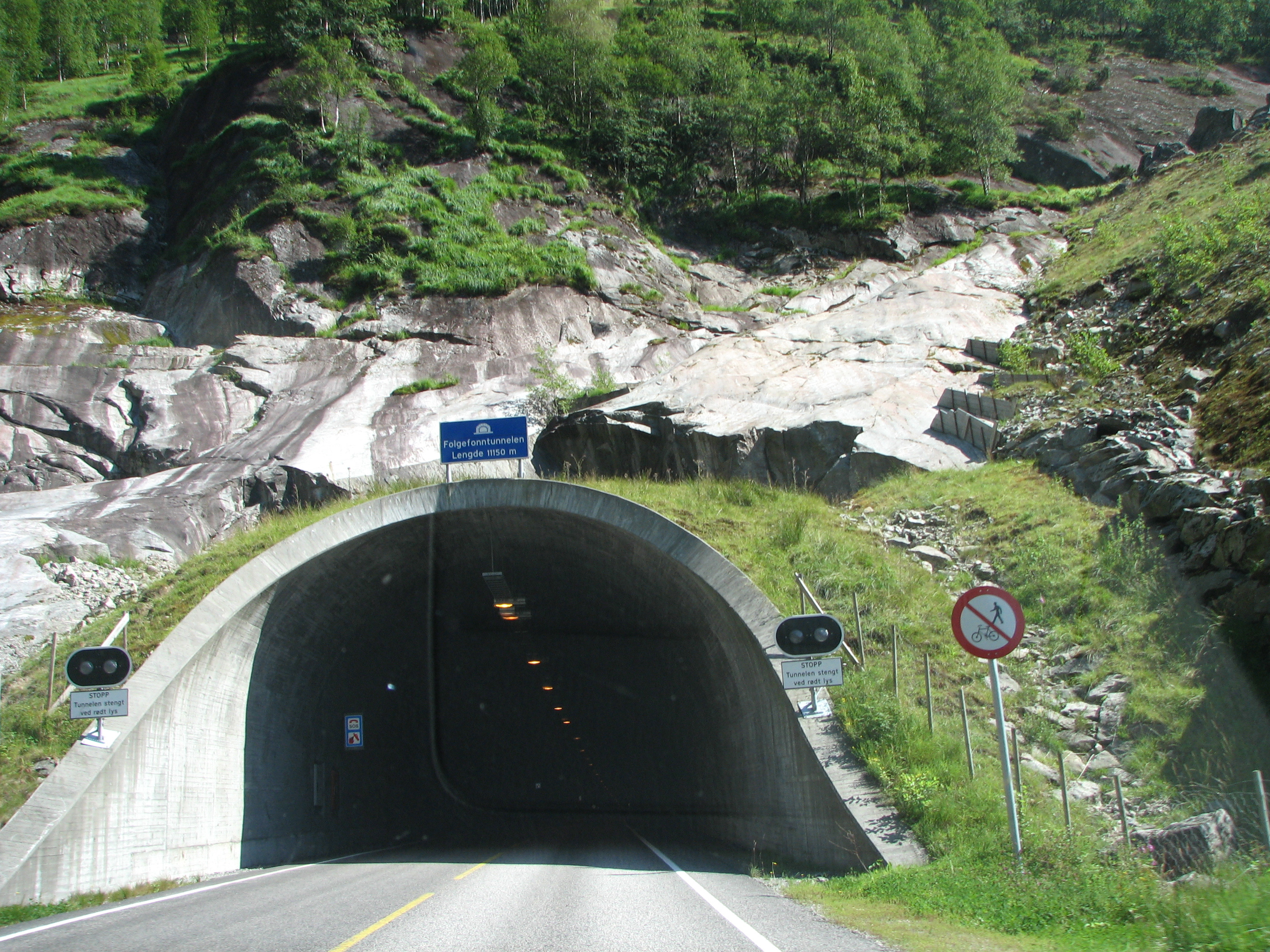
- Folgefonna Tunnel
- Interactive map of Folgefonna Tunnel; Folgefonntunnelen

Overview
- Location: Vestland, Norway
- Coordinates: 60.1225°N 6.4050°E
- Status: In use
- Route: Fv49
- Start: Austrepollen, Kvinnherad Municipality
- End: Eitrheim, Ullensvang Municipality

Operation
- Work began: June 1998
- Opened: 15 June 2001
- Traffic: Automotive

Technical
- Length: 11.15 kilometres (6.93 mi)
- No. of lanes: 2

The Folgefonna Tunnel (Norwegian: Folgefonntunnelen) is a 11,150-meter (36,580 ft) long road tunnel in Vestland county, Norway. The tunnel connects the village of Eitrheim and the town of Odda at the head of Sørfjorden in Ullensvang Municipality to the village of Austrepollen at the head of Maurangsfjorden in Kvinnherad Municipality. The tunnel runs under the large Folgefonna glacier and Folgefonna National Park. The tunnel opened in 2001 and is Norway's fourth longest road tunnel. It reduced travel time between these two places from four hours all the way down to ten minutes. It is part of County Road 49.

In year 2012, the 10.4-kilometre (6.5 mi) long Jondal Tunnel was built a short distance from this tunnel. Using these two tunnels and a ferry, the road distance between the E134 highway in the town of Odda and the city of Bergen is much shorter than before. Using this route to travel from Oslo to Bergen is shorter than taking the E16 highway, and this route is much less sensitive to snow storms in the winter (which is fairly long in the mountains) than by taking Norwegian National Road 7 (which is the shortest route between Oslo and Bergen).
