= Maurangerfjorden =

Fjord in Norway

- Maurangsfjorden
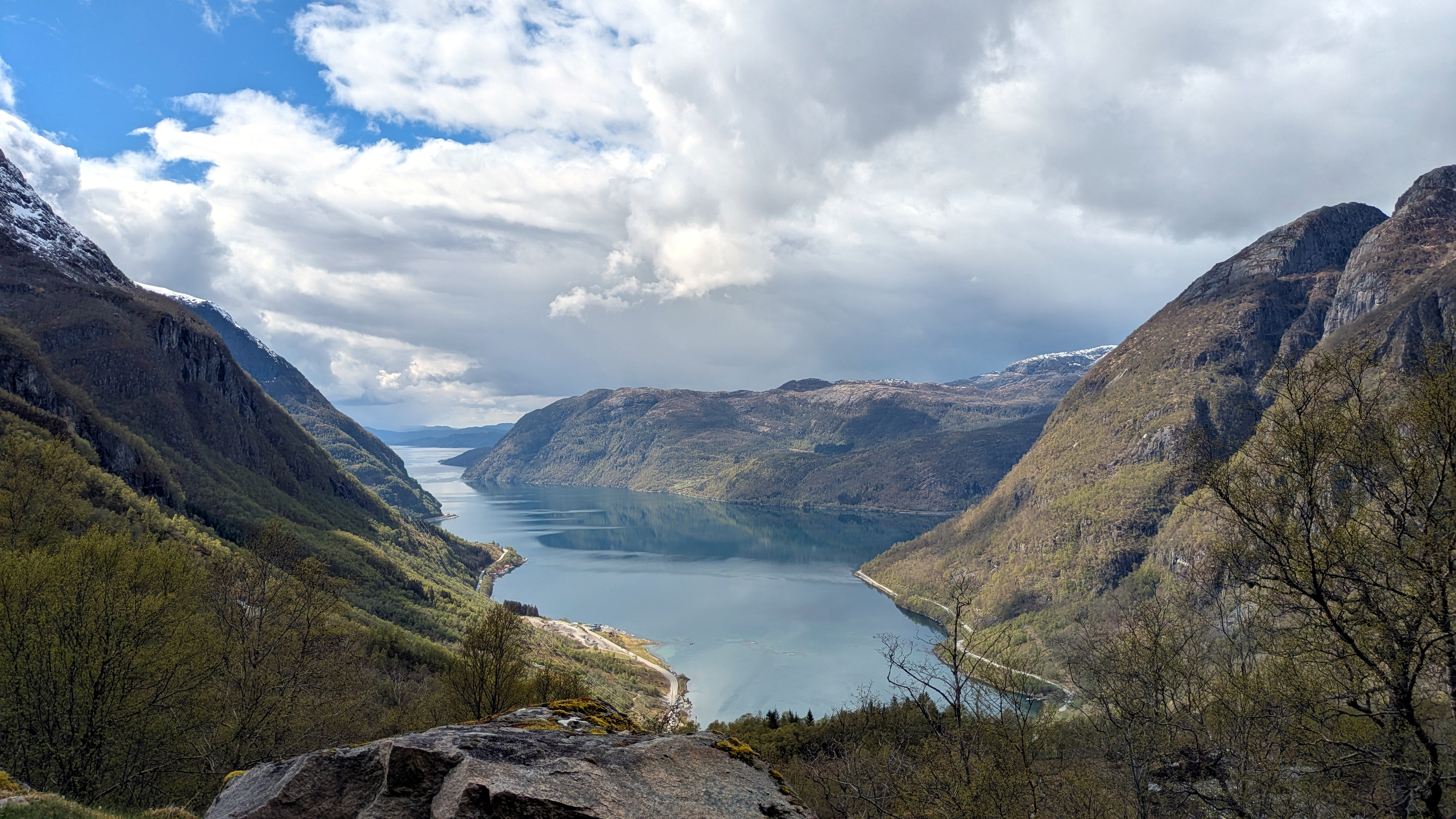
- Looking west towards Austrepollen and Maurangerfjorden
- Interactive map of the fjord
- Location: Vestland county, Norway
- Coordinates: 60.1093°N 6.1855°E
- Type: Fjord
- Primary outflows: Hardangerfjorden
- Basin countries: Norway
- Max. length: 12 kilometres (7.5 mi)
- Settlements: Ænes, Sunndal

Maurangerfjorden is a fjord in Kvinnherad Municipality in Vestland county, Norway. The 12-kilometre (7.5 mi) long fjord is a small branch off of the main Hardangerfjorden. The inner end of the Maurangsfjorden branches into the Nordrepollen and Austrepollen. There are several villages located along the fjord: Ænes, Sunndal, Austrepollen, Nordrepollen, and Gjetingsdalen. The Mauranger Hydroelectric Power Station is located in the village of Austrepollen.

== See also ==
- List of Norwegian fjords
