= Toven Tunnel =

Road tunnel in Nordland, Norway

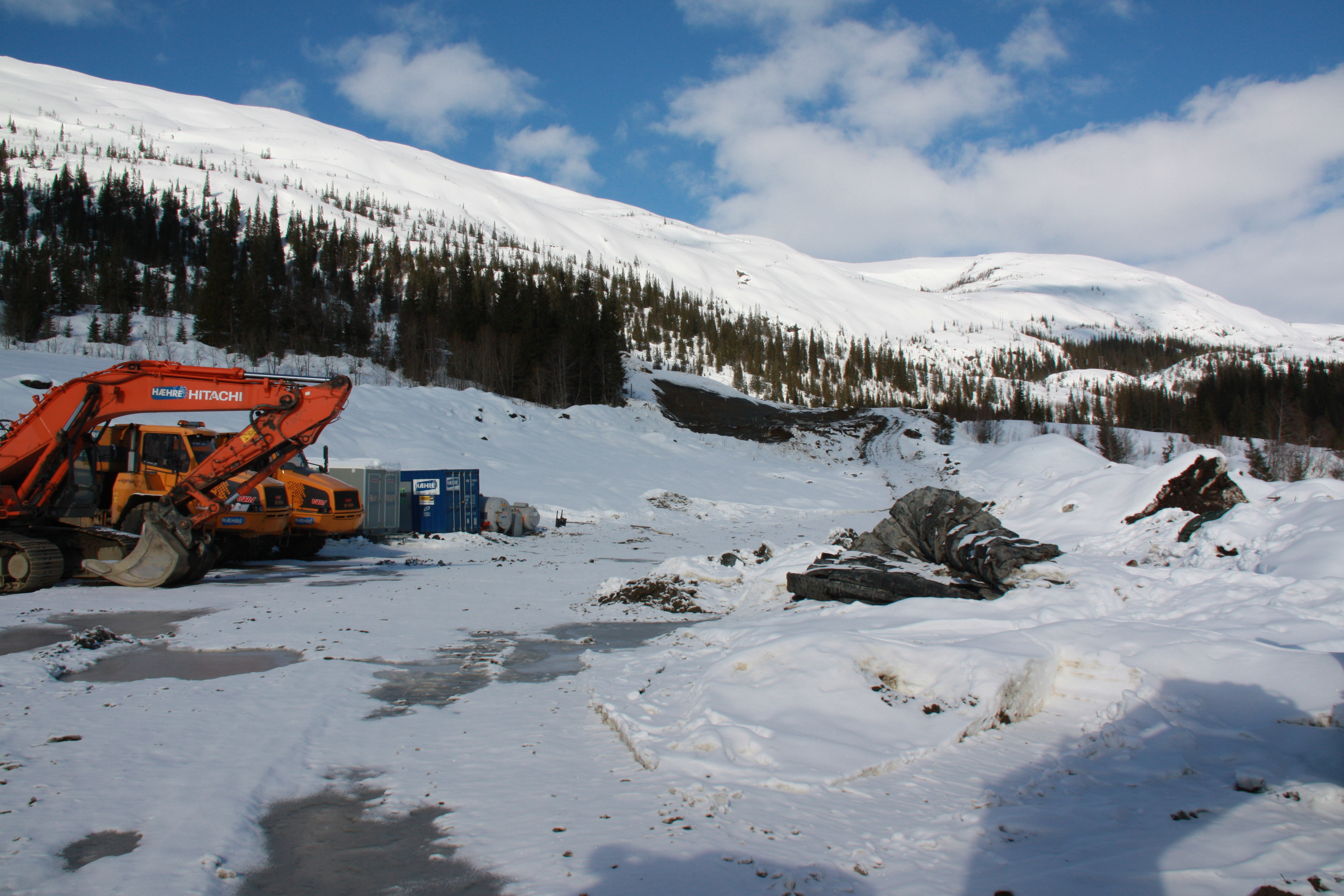
- Eastern entrance during construction
- Interactive map of Toven Tunnel

Overview
- Location: Nordland, Norway
- Coordinates: 66°03′12″N 013°11′30″E
- Route: Fv78
- Start: west 66°4′43″N 13°5′17″E
- End: east 66°0′59″N 13°16′10″E

Operation
- Work began: 2010
- Opened: 22 November 2014
- Traffic: Automotive
- Toll: yes

Technical
- Length: 10,665 metres (6.627 mi)

The Toven Tunnel (Norwegian: Toventunnelen) is a 10,665-metre-long (6.627 mi) road tunnel connecting Leirfjord Municipality and Vefsn Municipality, both in Nordland county in northern Norway. The tunnel is also the main access to the city of Sandnessjøen. Work on the tunnel started in 2010 and it was opened on 22 November 2014. It is the longest tunnel in Northern Norway.

The tunnel replaces a narrow, steep, twisting road along the Vefsnfjorden to the south of the tunnel. It shortens County Road 78 by eight kilometres (5.0 mi) and the travel time is shortened by 10–20 minutes. The cost of the tunnel, including new roads at both ends, was about 1460 million kr, of which 405 million kr is financed with a road toll.
