= Jondal Church =

Church in Vestland, Norway

- Jondal kyrkje
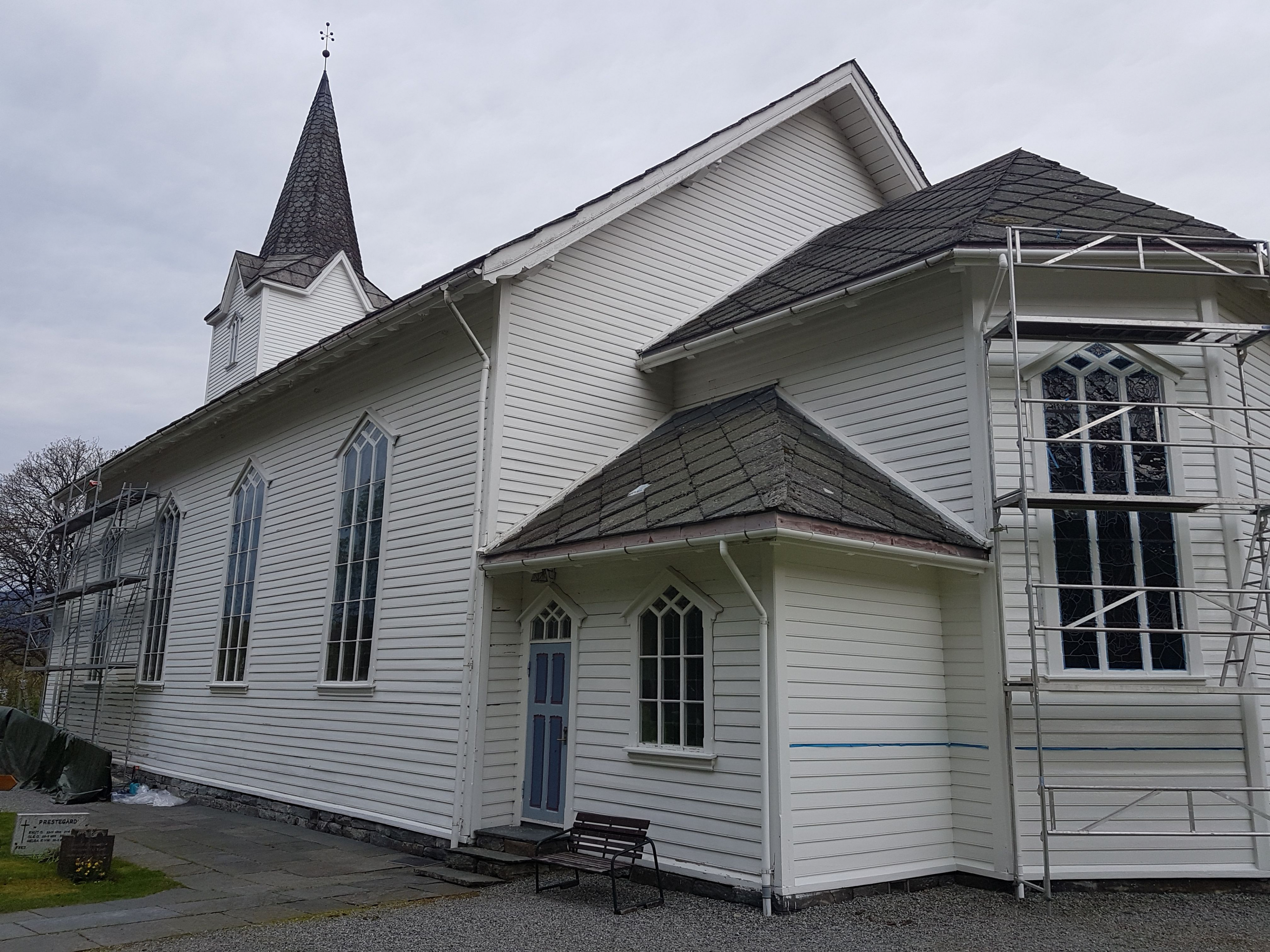
- View of the church
- Jondal Church
- 60°16′39″N 6°15′22″E
- Location: Ullensvang, Vestland
- Country: Norway
- Denomination: Church of Norway
- Previous denomination: Catholic Church
- Churchmanship: Evangelical Lutheran

History
- Status: Parish church
- Founded: 13th century
- Consecrated: 18 July 1888

Architecture
- Functional status: Active
- Architect(s): T. Solheim and T. Tengesdal
- Architectural type: Long church
- Completed: 1888 (138 years ago)

Specifications
- Capacity: 500
- Materials: Wood

Administration
- Diocese: Bjørgvin bispedømme
- Deanery: Hardanger og Voss prosti
- Parish: Jondal
- Norwegian Cultural Heritage Site
- Type: Church
- Status: Listed
- ID: 84739

Jondal Church (Norwegian: Jondal kyrkje) is a parish church of the Church of Norway in Ullensvang Municipality in Vestland county, Norway. It is located in the village of Jondal, near the shore of the Hardangerfjorden. It is the church for the Jondal parish which is part of the Hardanger og Voss prosti (deanery) in the Diocese of Bjørgvin. The white, wooden church was built in a long church design in 1888 using plans drawn up by the architects T. Solheim and Torjus Tengesdal. The church seats about 500 people, which makes it the largest church in Hardanger, leading it to sometimes be called the Hardanger Cathedral (Hardangerkatedral).

== History ==
The first church in Jondal was a wooden stave church that was built during the Middle Ages. The exact date of construction is not known, but the earliest existing historical records show that it was in use in 1309, so it must have been built sometime before that time. The church was likely established during the 13th century. The church had open air corridors surrounding the whole building. The old stave church was in use for centuries until it was torn down in 1725 because it was in such poor condition.

A new church was built on the same site to replace the old church. This church was completed in 1726 and it was a timber-framed long church that was built on the same foundation as the previous stave church. That church was used until 1888 when it too was torn down to make room for the present church which is much larger. The present church was built in 1888 by the architects Solheim and Tengesdal. The white, wooden church was consecrated on 18 July 1888. In 1978, the church porch under the tower was enlarged to create room for bathrooms and a coat room.

== Media gallery ==
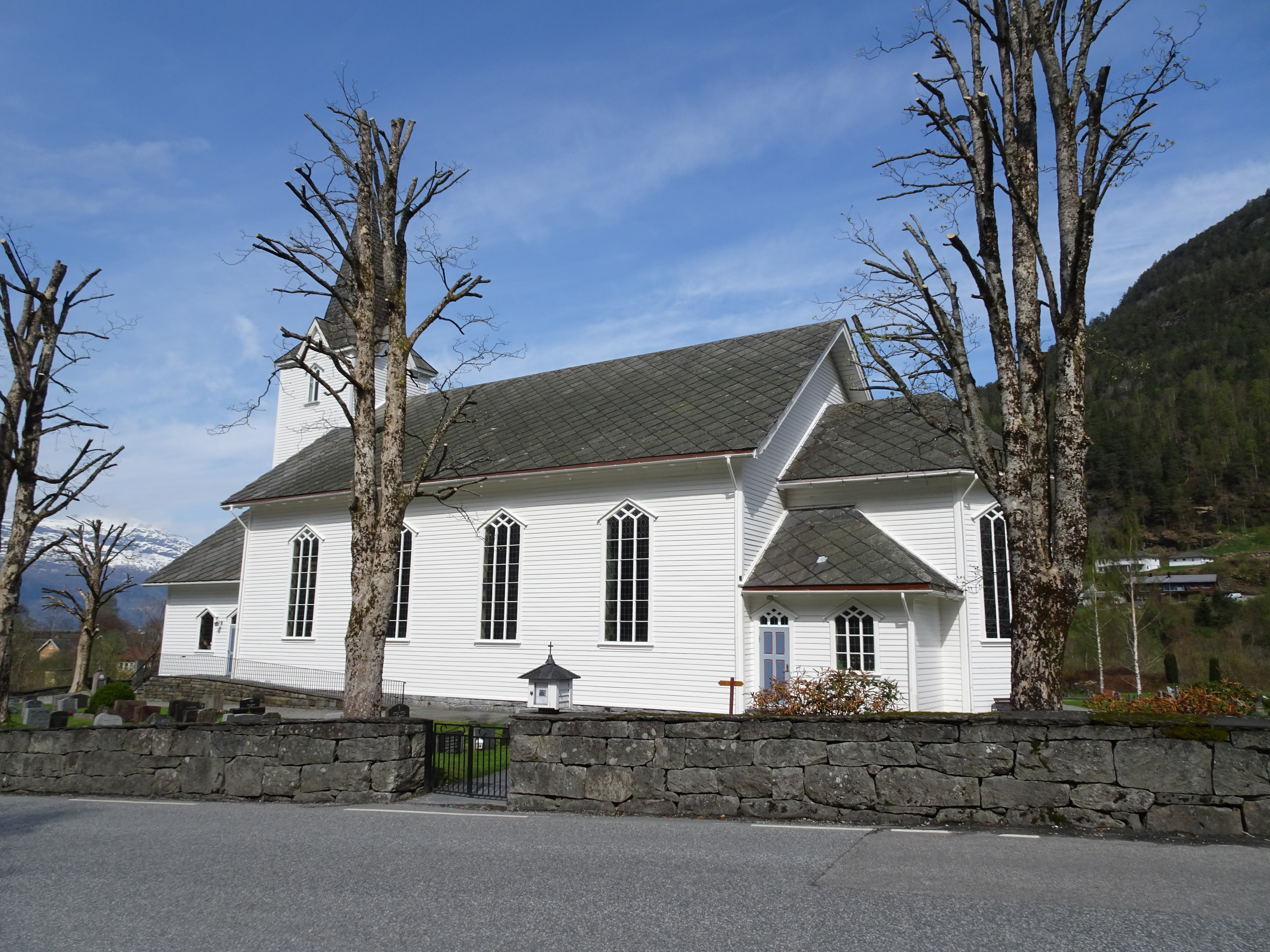
Exterior view

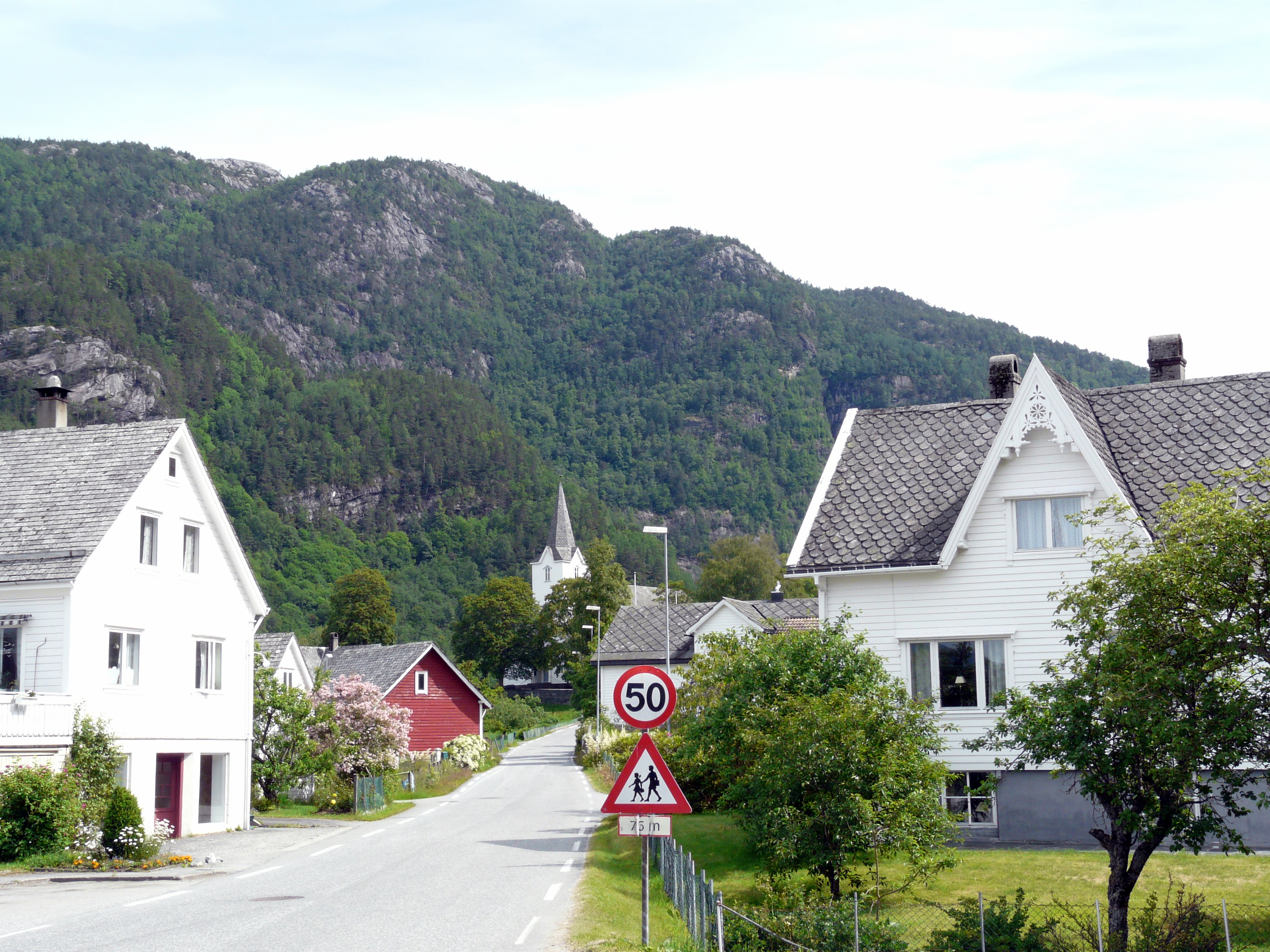
Church neighborhood

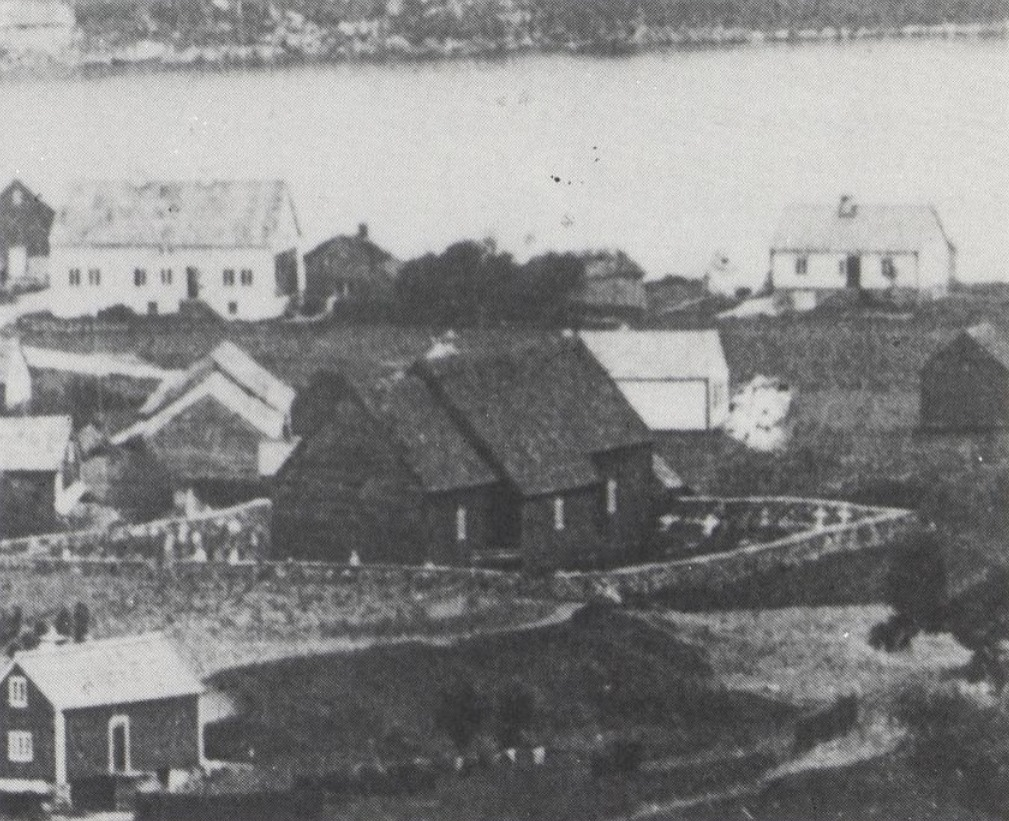
Old church (before 1887)

== See also ==
- List of churches in Bjørgvin
