= Jondal (village) =

Village in Ullensvang Municipality, Norway

- Village
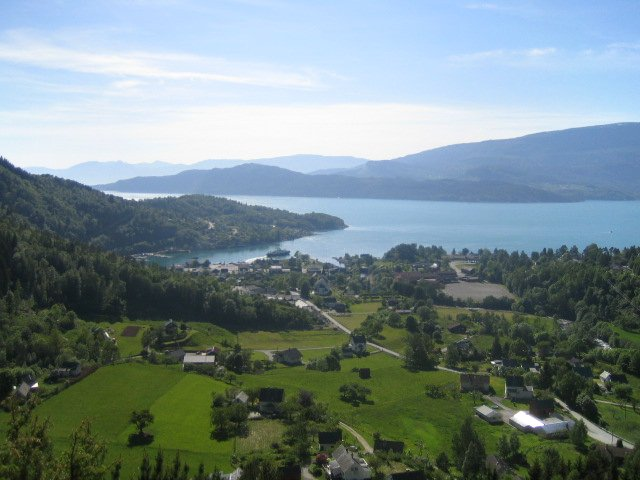
- View of the village
- Interactive map of Jondal
- Coordinates: 60.27586°N 6.25243°E
- Country: Norway
- Region: Western Norway
- County: Vestland
- District: Hardanger
- Municipality: Ullensvang Municipality

Area
  - Total: 0.58 km^{2} (0.22 sq mi)
- Elevation: 2 m (6.6 ft)

Population (2052)
  - Total: 427
  - Density: 736/km^{2} (1,910/sq mi)
- Time zone: UTC+01:00 (CET)
  - Summer (DST): UTC+02:00 (CEST)
- Post Code: 5627 Jondal

Jondal is a village in Ullensvang Municipality in Vestland county, Norway. The village is located on the southern shore of the Hardangerfjorden, about 55 kilometres (34 mi) southeast of the city of Bergen. It is located on the Folgefonna peninsula, about 12 kilometres (7.5 mi) northwest of the Folgefonna glacier in Folgefonna National Park. The village of Kysnesstranda lies about 15 kilometres (9.3 mi) to the south.

The 0.58-square-kilometre (140-acre) village has a population (2025) of 427 and a population density of 736 inhabitants per square kilometre (1,910/sq mi).

The entrance to the Jondal Tunnel lies just 5 kilometres (3.1 mi) south of the village. There is a regular ferry route from Jondal to Tørvikbygd in Kvam Municipality, across the fjord.

The village is bisected by the Jondalselvi river. The village is the commercial centre of the northwestern part of the municipality. There is one school (Jondal School) and it is located on the north side of the river in Jondal. Jondal Church is also located here.

== History ==
The village was the administrative centre of the former Jondal Municipality that existed until its dissolution in 2020.
