= Jondal Tunnel =

Road tunnel in Norway

Jondal Tunnel Jondalstunnelen
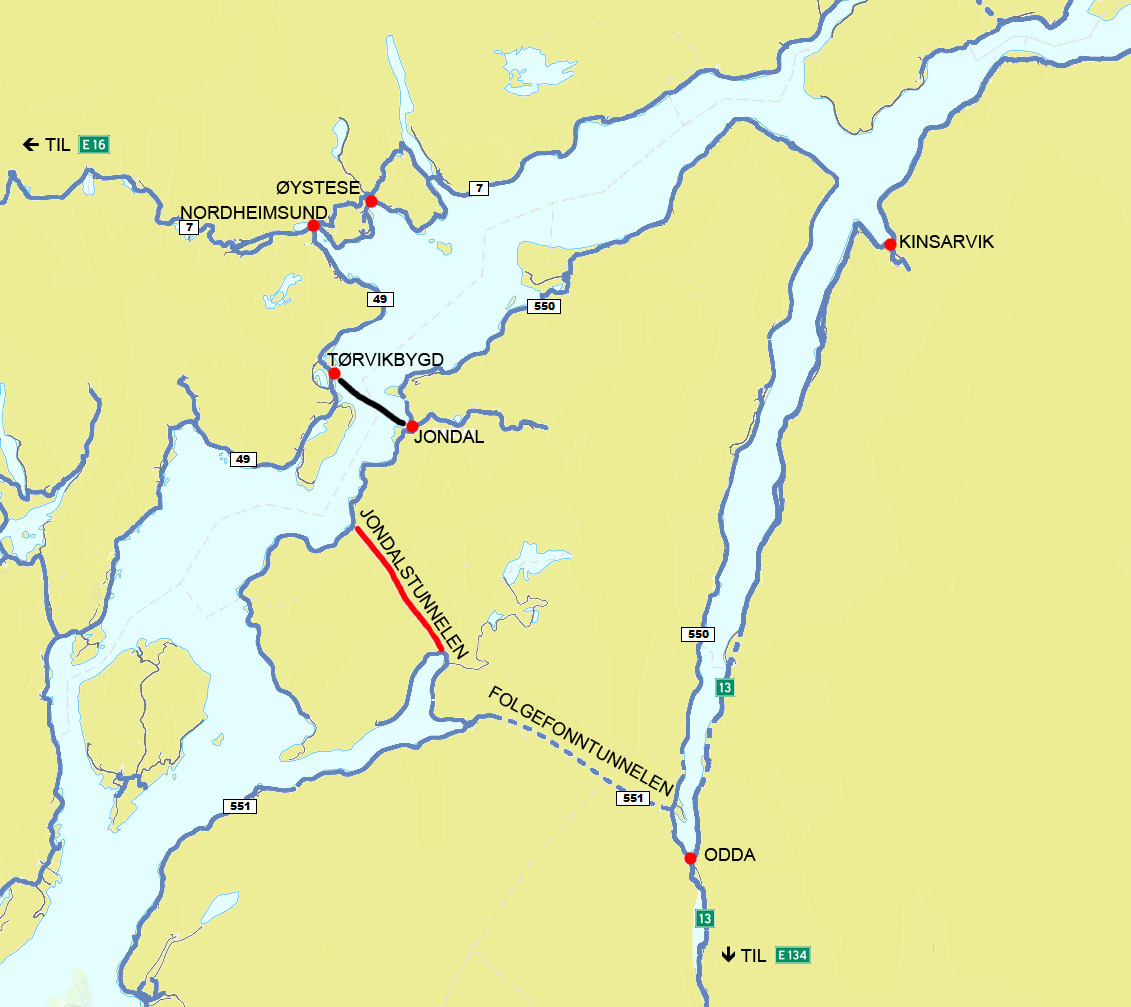
- Map of the tunnel
- Interactive map of Jondal Tunnel; Jondalstunnelen

Overview
- Location: Vestland, Norway
- Coordinates: 60.1953°N 6.2502°E
- Status: In use
- Route: Fv49
- Start: Torsnes, Ullensvang Municipality
- End: Nordrepollen, Kvinnherad Municipality

Operation
- Work began: October 2009
- Opened: 7 September 2012
- Operator: Norwegian Public Roads Administration
- Traffic: 685 AADT
- Character: Automotive

Technical
- Length: 10,400 metres (6.5 mi)
- No. of lanes: 2
- Tunnel clearance: 4.6 metres (15 ft)

The Jondal Tunnel (Norwegian: Jondalstunnelen) is a road tunnel in the Hardanger region of Vestland county, Norway. The tunnel is part of County Road 49 and it lies in Kvinnherad Municipality and Ullensvang Municipality. The 10.4-kilometre (6.5 mi) long tunnel was built to offer a better route between the cities of Bergen and Oslo. Cars can drive from Bergen to Tørvikbygda, then take a ferry to Jondal, then go through this tunnel, then a short drive to the Folgefonna Tunnel before getting to the town of Odda. From there it is a short drive on the narrow National Road 13 to the European route E134 highway which leads to Oslo.

Work on the tunnel began in October 2009. The tunnel was opened on 7 September 2012 by Prime Minister Jens Stoltenberg. The project cost almost 806.6 million kr. For the first 6 years of its use (until 2018), there was a toll for using the tunnel: 100 kr for small vehicles and 200 kr for large vehicles. This was reduced in 2018 and on 8 June 2020 the toll was removed.
