= Eid Municipality (Hordaland) =

Former municipality in Hordaland, Norway

Eid Municipality Eid herred
- Former municipality
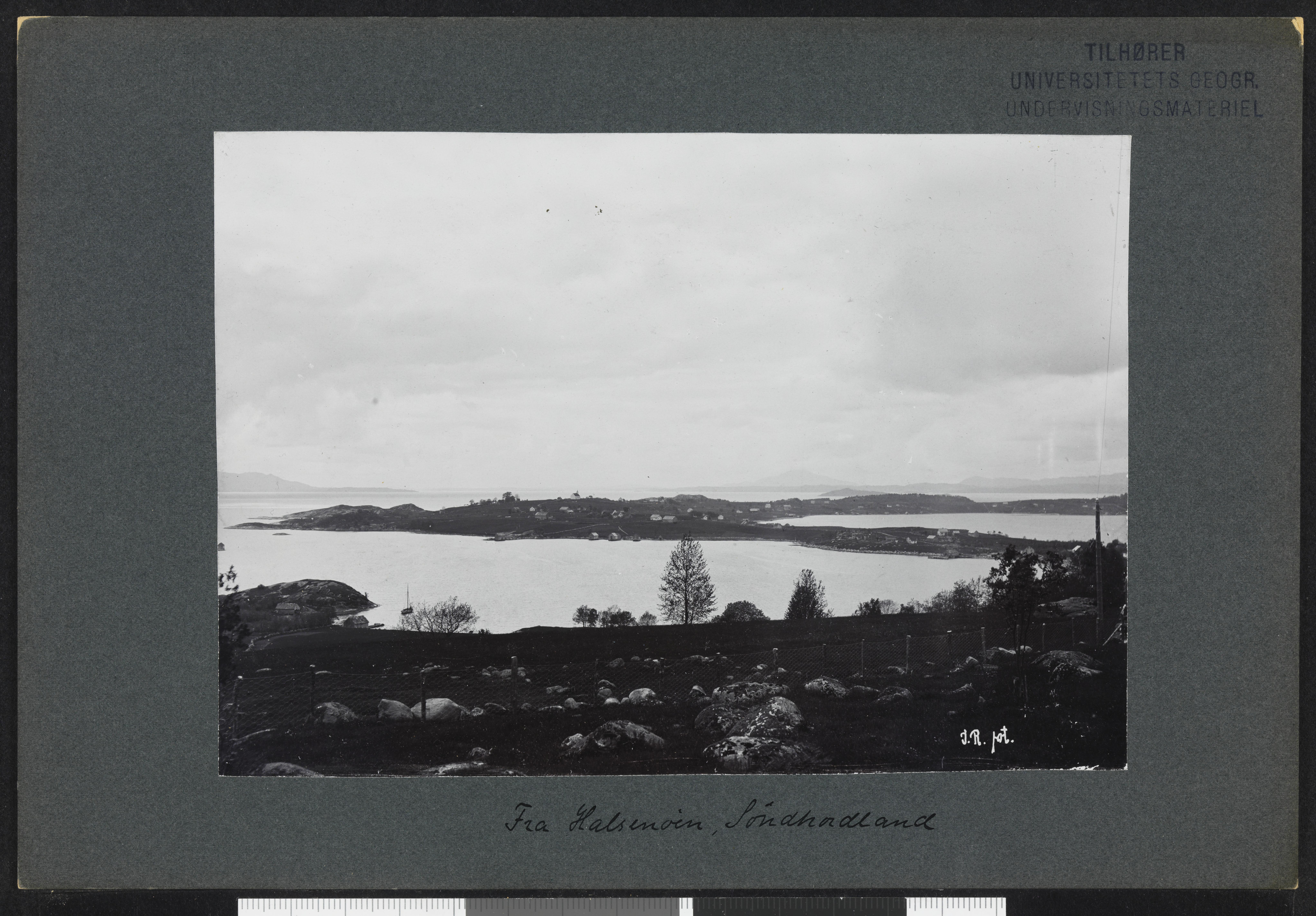

- Hordaland within Norway

- Eid within Hordaland
- Coordinates: 59°47′28″N 05°40′48″E
- Country: Norway
- County: Hordaland
- District: Sunnhordland
- Established: 1 Jan 1838
  - Created as: Formannskapsdistrikt
- Disestablished: 1 Jan 1855
  - Succeeded by: Fjelberg Municipality
- Administrative centre: Eidsvik

Government
  - Mayor (1838–1855): Jens Undahl

Area (upon dissolution)
  - Total: 70 km^{2} (27 sq mi)
- Highest elevation: 1,018 m (3,340 ft)

Population (1855)
  - Total: 1,207
  - Density: 17/km^{2} (45/sq mi)
- Time zone: UTC+01:00 (CET)
  - Summer (DST): UTC+02:00 (CEST)
- ISO 3166 code: NO-1282

Eid is a former municipality in the old Hordaland county, Norway. The approximately 70-square-kilometre (27 sq mi) municipality existed from 1838 until its dissolution in 1855. The area is now part of Kvinnherad Municipality in the traditional district of Sunnhordland in Vestland county. The administrative centre was the village of Eidsvik on the island of Halsnøya. Other villages in the municipality included Sæbøvik, Valen, and Høylandsbygda. The Halsnøy Abbey was located in the municipality.

== General information ==
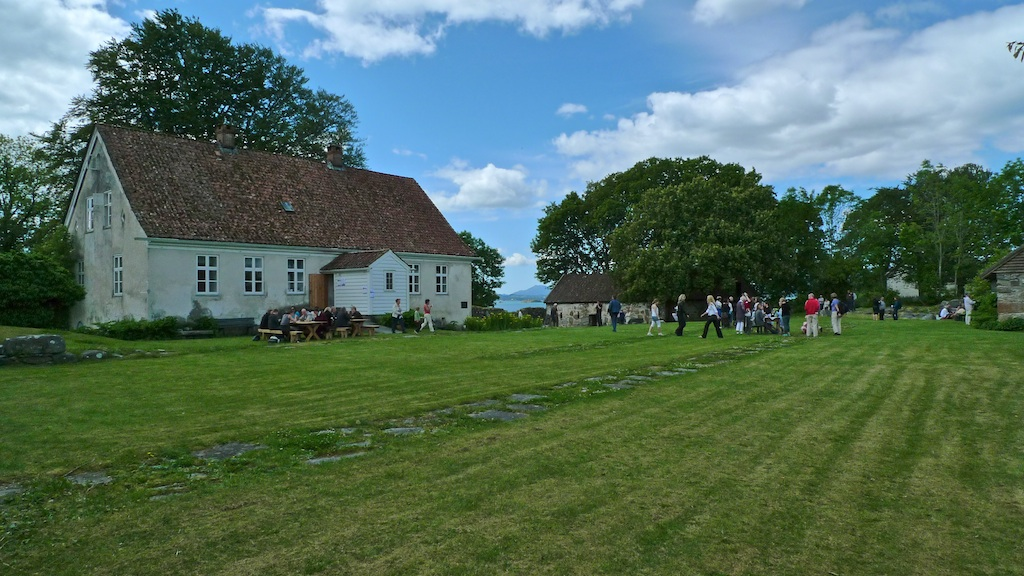
Halsnøy monastery

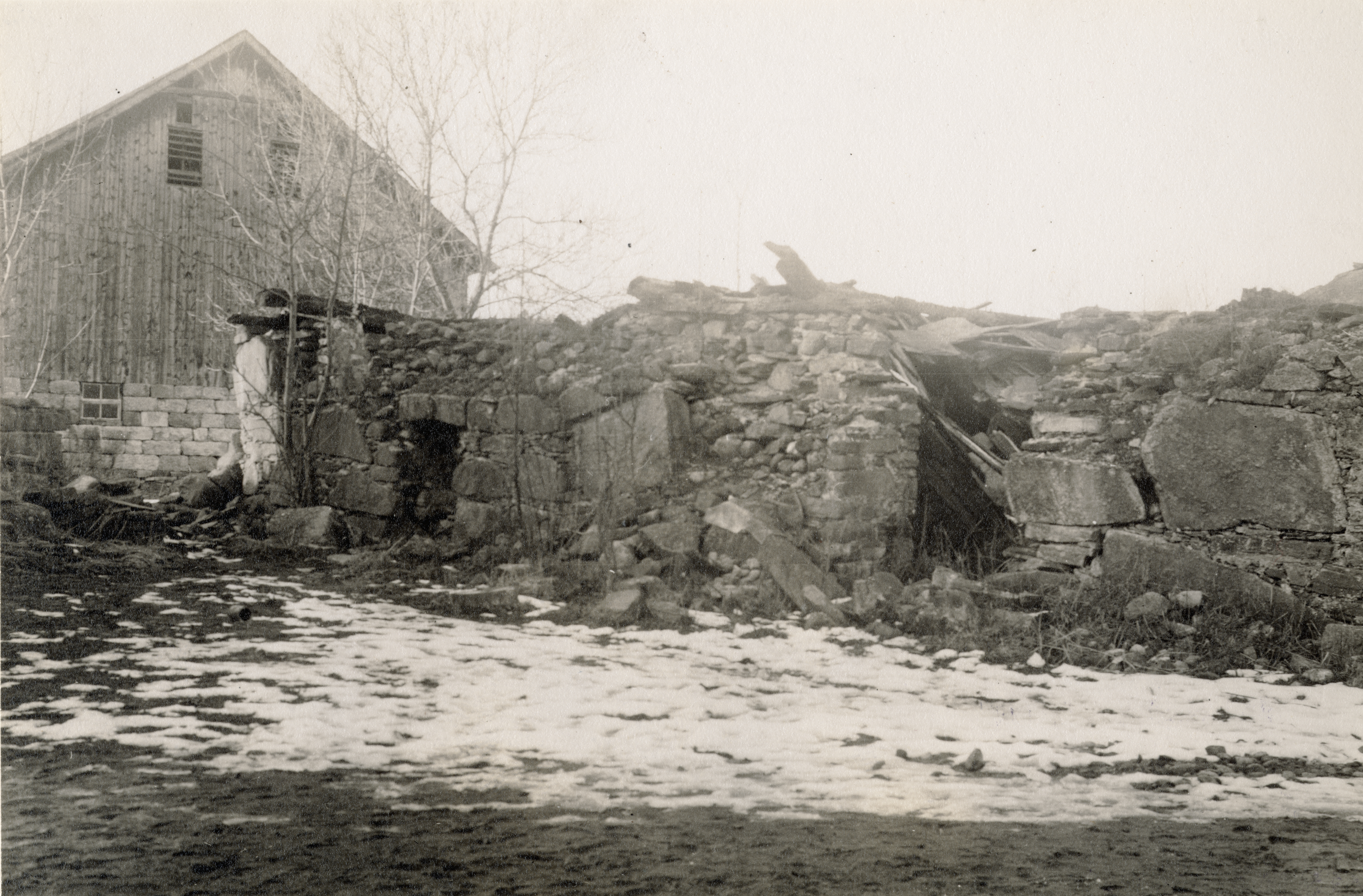
Halsnøy monastery ruins in Eid

The parish of Eid was established as a municipality on 1 January 1838 (see formannskapsdistrikt law). In 1855, Eid Municipality (population: 1,207) was merged into the neighboring Fjelberg Municipality (population: 3,587).

=== Name ===
The municipality (originally the parish) is named after the old Eide farm (Old Norse: Eiði), as the first Eid Church was built there. The name is the dative case of the word eið, which means "isthmus". The name is referring to the fact that the old farm area was located on a narrow isthmus on the island of Halsnøya.

=== Churches ===
The Church of Norway had one parish (sokn) within Eid Municipality. At the time of the municipal dissolution, it was part of the Fjelberg prestegjeld and the Sunnhordland prosti (deanery) in the Diocese of Bjørgvin.

Churches in Eid Municipality
Parish (sokn)	Church name	Location of the church	Year built
Eid	Eid Church	Eidsvik	1824

== Geography ==
The municipality was located in the outer Hardangerfjorden. It encompassed most of the island of Halsnøya, the southern part of the island of Huglo, some small surrounding islands, plus the Valen area on the mainland to the northeast. The highest point in the municipality was the 1,018-metre (3,340 ft) tall mountain Skorafjell, a tripoint on the border with Kvinnherad and Skånevik municipalities. Kvinnherad Municipality was located to the north, Skånevik Municipality was located to the east, Fjelberg Municipality was located to the south, and Stord Municipality was located to the west.

== Government ==
While it existed, Eid Municipality was governed by a municipal council of directly elected representatives. The mayor was indirectly elected by a vote of the municipal council.

=== Mayors ===
The mayor (Norwegian: ordfører) of Eid Municipality was the political leader of the municipality and the chairperson of the municipal council. During its time as a municipality, only one person held this position:

- 1838–1855: Lt. Jens Fredrik Larsen Undahl

== See also ==
- List of former municipalities of Norway
