= Fjelberg Municipality =

Former municipality in Hordaland, Norway

Fjelberg Municipality Fjelberg herred
- Former municipality
- Fjeldberg herred (historic name)
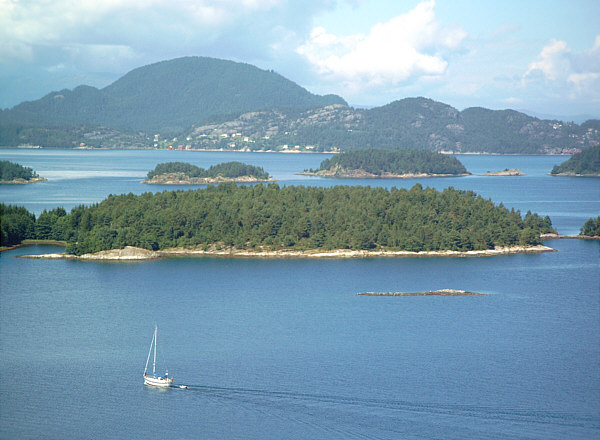
- Halsnøya island and surroundings

- Hordaland within Norway

- Fjelberg within Hordaland
- Coordinates: 59°44′47″N 05°41′45″E
- Country: Norway
- County: Hordaland
- District: Sunnhordland
- Established: 1 Jan 1838
  - Created as: Formannskapsdistrikt
- Disestablished: 1 Jan 1965
  - Succeeded by: Kvinnherad Municipality
- Administrative centre: Fjelberg

Government
  - Mayor (1955–1964): Jon Solheim (KrF)

Area (upon dissolution)
  - Total: 79.5 km^{2} (30.7 sq mi)
  - Rank: #440 in Norway
- Highest elevation: 1,018 m (3,340 ft)

Population (1964)
  - Total: 2,250
  - Rank: #370 in Norway
  - Density: 28.3/km^{2} (73/sq mi)
  - Change (10 years): ▼ −0.4%

Official language
  - Norwegian form: Nynorsk
- Time zone: UTC+01:00 (CET)
  - Summer (DST): UTC+02:00 (CEST)
- ISO 3166 code: NO-1213

Fjelberg is a former municipality in the old Hordaland county, Norway. The 79.5-square-kilometre (30.7 sq mi) municipality existed from 1838 until its dissolution in 1965. The area is now part of Kvinnherad Municipality in the traditional district of Sunnhordland in Vestland county. The administrative centre was the small village located on the island of Fjelbergøya where Fjelberg Church is located. Other villages in the municipality included Sæbøvik, Høylandsbygda, and Eidsvik.

Prior to its dissolution in 1965, the 79.5-square-kilometre (30.7 sq mi) municipality was the 440th largest by area out of the 525 municipalities in Norway. Fjelberg Municipality was the 370th most populous municipality in Norway with a population of about 2,250. The municipality's population density was 28.3 inhabitants per square kilometre (73/sq mi) and its population had decreased by 0.4% over the previous 10-year period.

== General information ==
The parish of Fjældberg was established as a formannskapsdistrikt on 1 January 1838. According to the 1835 census the parish had a population of 2,986 at the time.

In 1855, Eid Municipality (population: 1,207) was merged with Fjelberg Municipality (population: 3,587), creating a new, larger Fjelberg Municipality with a population of 4,794. In 1865, the southwestern parish of Vikebygd (population: 1,062) was separated from Fjelberg Municipality and merged with a part of neighboring Finnaas Municipality (population: 2,227) to create the new Sveen Municipality.

On 1 January 1898, the southern part of the island of Huglo (population: 117) was transferred from Fjelberg Municipality to the neighboring Stord Municipality. On 1 July 1916, the southern (mainland) part of Fjelberg Municipality (population: 1,715) was split off to form the new Ølen Municipality, leaving Fjelberg Municipality with 1,926 inhabitants.

On 1 January 1965, as part of the nationwide merging of municipalities as suggested by the Schei Committee, Fjelberg Municipality was dissolved and the following areas were merged to form a new, much larger Kvinnherad Municipality:

- all of Fjelberg Municipality (population: 2,308)
- all of Kvinnherad Municipality (population: 5,831)
- the areas of Skånevik Municipality located north of the Skånevikfjorden-Åkrafjorden from the village of Åkra and to the west (population: 1,189)
- most of Varaldsøy Municipality (population: 511), except for the Mundheim area which went to Kvam Municipality

=== Name ===
The municipality (originally the parish) is named after the island of Fjelbergøya (Old Norse: Fjǫlbyrja) since the first Fjelberg Church was built there. The first element is the prefix fjǫl- which means "much" or "many". The last element is byrr which means "fair wind" or "favorable wind" (in terms of sailing). Thus it is a place with many kinds of good winds for sailing.

=== Churches ===
The Church of Norway had two parishes (sokn) within Fjelberg Municipality. At the time of the municipal dissolution, it was part of the Fjelberg prestegjeld and the Nordre Sunnhordland prosti (deanery) in the Diocese of Bjørgvin.

Churches in Fjelberg Municipality
Parish (sokn)	Church name	Location of the church	Year built
Eid	Eid Church	Eidsvik	1824
Fjelberg	Fjelberg Church	Fjelbergøya	1722

== Geography ==
The municipality originally was much larger, but over time it was reduced in size so that upon its dissolution in 1965, it included the islands of Fjelbergøya, Borgundøya, and most of Halsnøya, as well as some small surrounding islands and the Valen area on the mainland. The highest point in the municipality was the 1,018-metre (3,340 ft) tall mountain Skorafjell, tripoint on the border with Kvinnherad Municipality and Skånevik Municipality.

== Government ==
While it existed, Fjelberg Municipality was responsible for primary education (through 10th grade), outpatient health services, senior citizen services, welfare and other social services, zoning, economic development, and municipal roads and utilities. The municipality was governed by a municipal council of directly elected representatives. The mayor was indirectly elected by a vote of the municipal council. The municipality was under the jurisdiction of the Sunnhordland District Court and the Gulating Court of Appeal.

=== Municipal council ===
The municipal council (Heradsstyre) of Fjelberg Municipality was made up of 21 representatives that were elected to four year terms. The tables below show the historical composition of the council by political party.

Fjelberg heradsstyre 1959–1963
Party name (in Nynorsk)	Number of representatives
Labour Party (Arbeidarpartiet)	4
Local List(s) (Lokale lister)	17
Total number of members:	21
Note: On 1 January 1964, Fjelberg Municipality became part of Kvinnherad Municipality.

Fjelberg heradsstyre 1955–1959
Party name (in Nynorsk)	Number of representatives
Labour Party (Arbeidarpartiet)	2
Local List(s) (Lokale lister)	19
Total number of members:	21

Fjelberg heradsstyre 1951–1955
Party name (in Nynorsk)	Number of representatives
Labour Party (Arbeidarpartiet)	4
Local List(s) (Lokale lister)	16
Total number of members:	20

Fjelberg heradsstyre 1947–1951
Party name (in Nynorsk)	Number of representatives
Labour Party (Arbeidarpartiet)	3
Local List(s) (Lokale lister)	17
Total number of members:	20

Fjelberg heradsstyre 1945–1947
Party name (in Nynorsk)	Number of representatives
Labour Party (Arbeidarpartiet)	3
Local List(s) (Lokale lister)	17
Total number of members:	20

Fjelberg heradsstyre 1937–1941*
Party name (in Nynorsk)	Number of representatives
Labour Party (Arbeidarpartiet)	1
Local List(s) (Lokale lister)	19
Total number of members:	20
Note: Due to the German occupation of Norway during World War II, no elections were held for new municipal councils until after the war ended in 1945.

=== Mayors ===
The mayor (Nynorsk: ordførar) of Fjelberg Municipality was the political leader of the municipality and the chairperson of the municipal council. The following people have held this position:

- 1838–1851: Rev. Laurentius Stub Koren
- 1852–1853: G. Gautesen
- 1854–1859: Iver Iversen Rødtvold
- 1860–1861: G. Gautesen
- 1862–1868: Axel Rosenkrantz Larsen Undahl
- 1869–1877: Niels Johnsen Sjo
- 1878–1893: Nils Juel (V)
- 1894–1904: Aadne Skaalnes
- 1906–1907: Henrik Sjo
- 1907–1908: Johannes Øvrevik
- 1908–1910: Jørgen Haugland
- 1911–1928: Henrik Sjo
- 1929–1942: Erik H. Eide
- 1942–1945: Johannes Tofte
- 1945–1949: Rev. Sverre Aarseth
- 1949–1955: Hilmar Eide
- 1955–1964: Jon Solheim (KrF)

== See also ==
- List of former municipalities of Norway
