= Fjelberg =

Fjelberg (or the historical spelling Fjeldberg or Fjælberg) may refer to:

== Places ==
- Fjelberg, or Fjelbergøya, an island-village in Kvinnherad Municipality in Vestland county, Norway
- Fjelberg Municipality, a former municipality in the old Hordaland county, Norway
- Fjelberg Church, a church in Kvinnherad Municipality in Vestland county, Norway

== People ==
- Jonas Fjeldberg (born 1998), a Norwegian professional footballer
- Svein Fjælberg (born 1959), a Norwegian former footballer
