= Halsnøy =

Halsnøy or Halsnøya may refer to:

== Places ==
- Halsnøy, Rogaland, an island in Stavanger Municipality in Rogaland county, Norway
- Halsnøya, an island in Kvinnherad Municipality in Vestland county, Norway
- Halsnøy Abbey, a historic abbey in Kvinnherad Municipality in Vestland county, Norway

== Other ==
- Halsnøy IL, a sports club based in Kvinnherad Municipality in Vestland county, Norway
- Halsnøy Tunnel, a subsea road tunnel which connects the island of Halsnøya to the mainland in Kvinnherad Municipality in Vestland county, Norway
