= Høylandsbygd shipping mural =

Wall mural in Norway

The unfinished front wall of the mural in 2009

The Høylandsbygd shipping mural is a wall mural located in Høylandsbygda on the island of Halsnøya in Kvinnherad Municipality in Norway. It is the biggest painted mural in the world, with the larger of the two painted walls being 80 by 16 metres (262 ft × 52 ft). The total area of both paintings is 1,500 square metres (16,000 sq ft).

The mural was originally conceived by shipping magnate Johannes Eide in 2008, when he imagined the walls of a former shipbuilding hall being covered by paintings of old boats and images from the shipping industry. A few months later, he announced a set of plans and drawings for the project.

Construction of the mural was begun in late April 2009 when the entire hall was coloured white. Soon after, scaffolding was erected around the hall to prepare for the paintings. The first wall was finished on 27 May 2009. Painting of the main wall began a few days later, but stopped in August and was postponed due to bad weather. On 2 July 2010 the painters resumed their work, which was finished a few weeks later. On 6 August the mural was officially declared finished and opened.

The artwork has been done by two Polish artists, Margaret and Konrad Waraksa, and is a collage of boats and boats being built using old tools. The background is the view behind the hall when seen from a specific angle. The boats displayed on the paintings are vessels built at the old Eide shipping plant, which was situated 100 metres (330 ft) west of the hall.

On 2 July 2010 it was reported that a Polish TV channel was producing a special on the mural and its painters.
