= Eide Marine Services =

Defunct marine salvage and offshore investment firm

- Industry: Shipping; Marine salvage Offshore investment
- Predecessor: Georg Eides Sønner (1955-92)
- Founded: 1992
- Defunct: September 30, 2016
- Headquarters: Høylandsbygda, Vestland
- Area served: Transport and Logistics, heavy lift operations, salvage, installation and maintenance of subsea equipment and wind turbines offshore, concept development, design and engineering
- Key people: Johannes Eide (founder, former CEO); Georg Eide (CEO)
- Revenue: ▼NOK –90 million (2015)
- Website: http://eidemarine.com

Eide Marine Services is a defunct marine salvage and offshore investment firm based in Norway, specializing in transport, logistics and heavy lift operations. The company has its headquarters in Høylandsbygda on the island of Halsnøya in Kvinnherad Municipality, Norway. The company was founded in 1992, after the restructuring and merging of Eide Contracting and Eide Marine Tech. Following several years of deficits, aggravated by the long-term effects of the 2008 financial crisis, the company filed for bankruptcy in September 2016.

== History ==
=== Early history ===
The original company, Georg Eide's Sønner, was founded in 1955 by brothers Johannes and Gerhard Eide. Named in honour of their late boatbuilder father, Georg Eide Sr. (1896-1951) also a shipbuilder, the company focused on building wooden hulled boats for the fishing industry, which were still the most common vessels in rural Norway. During the first decade, the company grew fast, and by the late 1960s the company was one of the leading job suppliers in the county. With the decline of wooden hulls in the 1970s, the conmpany struggled to restructure their operations to meet modern demands for steel and aluminium hulls, leading to financial difficulties by the end of the decade. In 1982, two daughter companies were formed, Eide Marine Tech and Eide Contracting, in an attempt to restructure and delegate some of the companies assets and operations. Despite these efforts, main company Georg Eides Sønner was forced to declare bankruptcy in 1983.

=== Recent (1992-today) ===
Despite efforts to stabilize the finances of the company the struggles continued into the 1990s, and in 1992, the companies were merged into Eide Marine Services, the restructuring of which included selling the main shipyard, Halsnøy Verft, to rival firm Mjellem & Karlsen the following year. In the 1990s and 2000s, the company gradually shifted their main operations towards the marine salvage market and offshore investments, with notable operations including the raising and salvage of M/S Sleipner in 1999 and Green Aalesund in 2001. In 2004, the company was once again in the media spotlight during the highly publicized capsize and raising of M/S Rocknes in 2004, cementing their status as one of the leading salvage experts in Scandinavia.

However, the 2008 financial crisis had devastating effects on the maritime and shipping industries, nearly forcing to company into bankruptcy in 2007, after what Georg Eide described as "badly timed investments" shortly before the crisis. One of these investments was the procurement of the cargo vessel "Eide Carrier", who would attract significant media coverage ten years later. By 2009, the company was again managing a small profit, and in June 2010, the company announced the signing of a long-term contract to produce maintenance ships for Brazilian firm Lupatech, at the time estimated to generate 6.3 billion NOK (c. 1 billion USD) of revenue until 2020. However, the contract was cancelled in 2012 when Lupatech underwent a restructuring, leading to substantial losses for Eide Marine, who had already completed 70% of the work on two of the ten vessels ordered. The two partially constructed vessels were eventually sold to Statoil later the same year.

In the following years, the company suffered heavy deficits due to lack of long-term contracts, failed investments and high running costs of their many vessels, the majority of which were inactive. In 2015, the company reported a 90 million NOK deficit, nearly 300 million less than 2014. In 2016, a large number of employees were let go in an attempt to stabilize the economy, but by August that year, the company were forced to apply for credit extensions.

On 30 September 2016, the company filed for bankruptcy, reporting an outstanding debt of at least 500 million NOK and a predicted revenue of almost -100 million NOK for the fiscal year 2016. The following month, Norwegian maritime firm Meidell AS completed the purchase of the estate, with plans to continue operations of the shipyard and some of the transport work.

In February 2017, the company once again entered the media spotlight when the cargo vessel "Eide Carrier" - since sold and renamed "Tide Carrier" - lost engine power and almost ran aground en route to the Indian Ocean, with allegations of attempts to illegally salvage the ship in Pakistan.

"Mr Eide was sentenced in November 2020 to six months unconditional imprisonment for having assisted scrap dealer Wirana in the attempt to illegally export the ship. The Court also ordered the confiscation of criminal dividends of NOK 2 million from Eide Marine Eidendom AS. On the other hand, cash buyer Wirana has been fined NOK 7 million for having falsified papers to deceive Norwegian authorities about the ship's true destination and its seaworthiness to allow the vessel to leave Norway. The cash buyer agreed to pay the fine, but without acknowledging wrongdoing"

In March 2022, "The Gulating Lagmannsrett, an Appeal Court in the Norwegian city of Bergen, has confirmed the prison sentence for Norwegian ship owner Georg Eide for aiding and abetting the attempt to export the ship Tide Carrier, aka Eide Carrier and Harrier, to Pakistan for scrapping"
