= Sunde, Kvinnherad =

Village in Kvinnherad Municipality, Norway

Sunde
- Village
- Interactive map of Sunde
- Coordinates: 59.83658°N 5.71705°E
- Country: Norway
- Region: Western Norway
- County: Vestland
- District: Sunnhordland
- Municipality: Kvinnherad Municipality
- Elevation: 46 m (151 ft)
- Time zone: UTC+01:00 (CET)
  - Summer (DST): UTC+02:00 (CEST)
- Post Code: 5450 Sunde i Sunnhordland

Sunde is a village in Kvinnherad Municipality in Vestland county, Norway. The village is located along the Hardangerfjorden, just north of the island of Halsnøya. The northern entrance to the Halsnøy Tunnel is located in Sunde. The large urban village of Husnes lies just to the north of Sunde, on the other end of the lake Opsangervatnet.

The village of Sunde is grouped together with the neighboring village of Valen (to the east) by Statistics Norway which calls it the Sunde/Valen "urban area". The 1.92-square-kilometre (470-acre) urban area has a population (2025) of 2,303 and a population density of 1,199 inhabitants per square kilometre (3,110/sq mi).
