= Kvinnheringen =

Norwegian newspaper

- Type: Local newspaper
- Format: Tabloid
- Owner: Amedia
- Founder(s): Kristian Hus; Torfinn Myklebust
- Publisher: Amedia
- Editor: Mona Grønningen (since 2019)
- Staff writers: 8 (as of 2021)
- Founded: January 3, 1973
- Political alignment: Neutral
- Language: Nynorsk
- Headquarters: Husnes, Kvinnherad Municipality
- Circulation: 4 400 (paper); 7 300 (total readers)
- Website: Website

Kvinnheringen is a Norwegian regional newspaper for Kvinnherad Municipality in Vestland county. In print since 1973, it is currently released bi-weekly with more than 7000 readers and a circulation of 4 400 as of January 2021. Since 2003, the paper has been published both on paper and digitally. In 2015, the newspaper was awarded the European Newspaper Award in the category of local newspaper.

== History ==
In 1962, SØRAL was established in Husnes, leading to the industrialization and urbanisation of the outer regions of Kvinnherad. Between 1950 and 1970, the population in the municipality would double - from 5 600 to 11 600 - both due to the arrival of workers, but also the merger between former municipalities Kvinnherad, Skånevik and Fjelberg. Despite this, the only newspapers covering the area were larger, regional publications printed in the larger cities Bergen and Haugesund, and in the neighbouring Stord Municipality, and they were frequently criticized for failing to write news stories about the outskirts of their circulation area.

This eventually led to writer Kristian Hus and teacher Torfinn Myklebust, the latter being the son of a former newspaper editor, forming the local paper in late 1972, with the inaugural newspaper released on 3 January 1973. In the first year of publishing, the circulation was less than 1000, and the newspaper didn't even have an office, instead being run from a spare room in editor Torfinn Myklebusts own home. Initially, the newspaper was released weekly, which increased to twice a week in 1974 and three times a week in 1980; on Mondays, Wednesdays and Fridays. In 1998, the newspaper became a joint stock company and moved into new offices, where they still remain as of 2021. In 2003, the newspaper became one of the first regional papers in Norway to release each issue digitally in addition to the paper copy, using a copy-protected PDF format.

In 2013, the newspaper launched its own reader app, which in addition to the digital copy of the newspaper and archive of previous releases also featured a text-to-speech assistant. In 2015, the newspaper was the recipient of the 17th European Newspaper Award in the category of local newspaper. In 2019, Tomas Bruvik stepped down as editor after fourteen years. He was succeeded by journalist Mona Grønningen. In 2020, partially due to the effects of the COVID-19 pandemic, the newspaper shifted from three to two papers per week, stating that it would make way for more quality content and less "filler".

=== Archive ===
Unlike many regional newspapers in Norway, Kvinnheringen has a near-complete, searchable archive of all their previous issues dating back to 3 January 1973. Since 2018, the complete archive has been accessible online to all subscribers.
