= Opsangervatnet =

Lake in Kvinnherad, Norway

Opsangervatnet Onarheimsvatnet
- Upsangervatnet
- Interactive map of the lake
- Location: Kvinnherad Municipality, Vestland
- Coordinates: 59.85135°N 5.75971°E
- Basin countries: Norway
- Max. length: 3.5 kilometres (2.2 mi)
- Max. width: 1.2 kilometres (0.75 mi)
- Surface area: 2.25 km^{2} (0.87 sq mi)
- Shore length^{1}: 12.28 kilometres (7.63 mi)
- Surface elevation: 8 metres (26 ft)
- References: NVE
- ^{1} Shore length is not a well-defined measure.

Opsangervatnet or Onarheimsvatnet is a lake in Kvinnherad Municipality in Vestland county, Norway. The 2.25-square-kilometre (0.87 sq mi) lake is located between the villages of Husnes and Sunde.

== See also ==
- List of lakes in Norway
