= Husnes =

Village in Kvinnherad Municipality, Norway

- Village
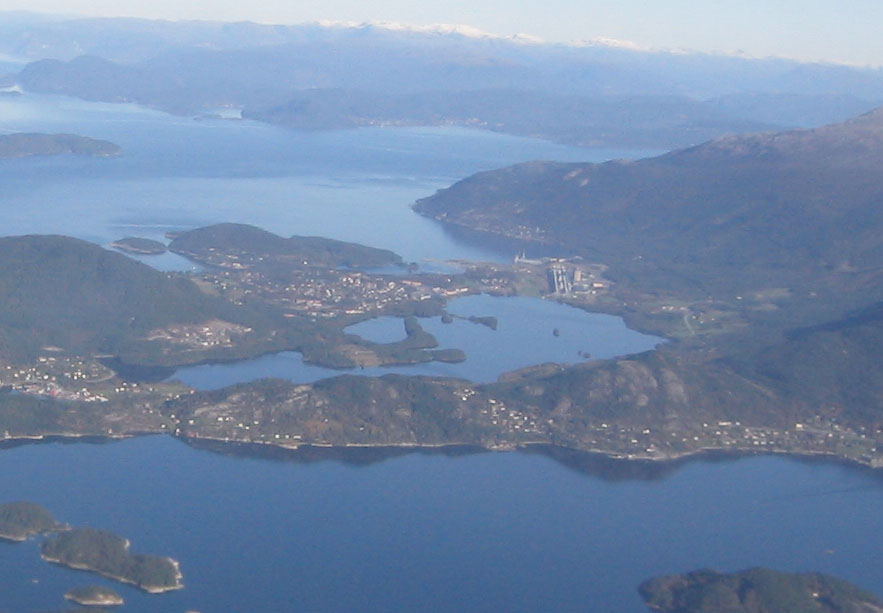
- View of the village (2008)
- Interactive map of Husnes
- Coordinates: 59.86377°N 5.74533°E
- Country: Norway
- Region: Western Norway
- County: Vestland
- District: Sunnhordland
- Municipality: Kvinnherad Municipality

Area
  - Total: 2.52 km^{2} (0.97 sq mi)
- Elevation: 29 m (95 ft)

Population (2025)
  - Total: 2,337
  - Density: 927/km^{2} (2,400/sq mi)
- Demonym: Husnesing
- Time zone: UTC+01:00 (CET)
  - Summer (DST): UTC+02:00 (CEST)
- Post Code: 5460 Husnes
- Website: husnesnett.no

Husnes is the largest village in Kvinnherad Municipality in Vestland county, Norway. The village is located on the southern shore of the Hardangerfjorden on the Folgefonna peninsula, about 8 kilometres (5.0 mi) south of the village of Herøysund and immediately north of the villages of Sunde and Valen. The lake Opsangervatnet lies along the southwestern part of the village between Husnes and Sunde.

The 2.52-square-kilometre (620-acre) village has a population (2025) of 2,337 and a population density of 927 inhabitants per square kilometre (2,400/sq mi). When the neighboring villages of Sunde and Valen are included, the entire urban area includes just under 4,500 people.

Husnes is centered on the huge factory owned by Hydro, formerly Sør-Norge Aluminium, and the village has become the center of commerce and education in Kvinnherad municipality, as well as the site of Husnes Church. The government of Kvinnherad Municipality has at times proposed that Husnes become the new administrative centre of Kvinnherad which usually sparks debate in the municipality.

== Industry and commerce ==
Husnes is the commercial capital of Kvinnherad Municipality, with Husnes Storsenter, the largest shopping center in Sunnhordland having opened in 2008 following renovations. In addition, most commercial companies in Kvinnherad, including HMR Group and Hydro Husnes, have their headquarters in Husnes, along with local newspaper Kvinnheringen.

In 2014, Husnes was given official status as "regional centre" in the new development plan for the Sunnhordland region. This was met with enthusiasm, as this would allow more funding for infrastructure and improvements, which began with the construction of a new main road the following year. This was followed by the construction of several new stores, apartment buildings. In 2019 it was announced that a new elementary school campus would be built within 2025 to meet regional requirements. In 2022, the regional authority announced that Husnes could potentially lose their regional centre status due to failing to meet the new, revised requirements in terms of population and commercial growth, with a final decision expected before 2026.

== Education ==
Husnes has one elementary school, one junior high school, and one high school, as well as two additional elementary schools in the immediate suburbs. The high school, Kvinnherad Vidaregåande Skule, is the only high school in Kvinnheard Municipality, and houses around 400 students each year.

== Notable people ==
- Asbjørn Slettemark, a journalist, TV-show host and former Pop Idol judge
- Per Olav Alvestad, a television presenter and host
- Steinar Taarn Sande, a musician
