= Høylandsbygda =

Village in Kvinnherad Municipality, Norway

Høylandsbygda Høylandsbygdi
- Village
- Interactive map of Høylandsbygda
- Coordinates: 59.78343°N 5.80274°E
- Country: Norway
- Region: Western Norway
- County: Vestland
- District: Sunnhordland
- Municipality: Kvinnherad Municipality
- Elevation: 29 m (95 ft)

Population (2013)
  - Total: 434
- Demonym: Høylandsbygdar
- Time zone: UTC+01:00 (CET)
  - Summer (DST): UTC+02:00 (CEST)
- Post Code: 5457 Høylandsbygd
- Website: hoylandsbygd.no

Høylandsbygda is a village in Kvinnherad Municipality in Vestland county, Norway. The village is located on the eastern part of the island of Halsnøya. It is one of the largest urban areas on the island, just after Sæbøvik and Eidsvik. While originally one of the island's largest farming villages, today it is renowned for its position in Norwegian shipping industry.

Until 1964, the village was divided between two municipalities: Fjelberg Municipality and Skånevik Municipality, with the border running in parallel with today's main road called Slettanesveien. Since 1964, it has been part of Kvinnherad Municipality.

== Name ==
The name Høylandsbygda is made up of two parts: "høyland" and "bygda". "Høyland" is Norwegian for "the high lands", and bygda is Old Norse for "district" or "settlement". The name loosely translates to "the settlement in the high lands", and references the early farms and settlements which were built in the higher fields of the village.

== History ==
=== Early history (600-1600) ===
The geographical area that is Høylandsbygda today was originally farmland under the large farm of Hauge, which has been inhabited and used as farmland since at least c. 650 A.D., with findings confirming the presence of settlements both along the village coast and where the main farmhouses are today. There is a written record of the inhabitants since the 12th century, which also shows that the farm was divided into five sections during the 13th century: Hauge, Mehus, Bjørgjo, Tveito/Berhaug, and Mjelkevik, the latter two of which were extensions of Hauge rather than their own, separate farms.

As the Black Plague hit Norway in 1349–1350, the farms were hit heavily, with only Hauge and Mehus having survivors, and the other three being either abandoned or incorporated into other farms. Bjørgjo was sold to the Halsnøy Abbey landlords, and remained in their possession until the 1580s, while Tveito and Mjelkevik were incorporated into Hauge as farmland.

During the following centuries, the farms grew in numbers, with the remaining farms gradually being divided into several farms, as well as the western parts of today's village being built on to make new settlements. By the 17th century, the number of inhabitants had grown to more than 200, an impressive number in those times.

=== Farming village (1600 - 1850) ===
By the early 17th century, there was more than ten major farms in today's Høylandsbygda, and it had become one of the biggest farming villages in the region. There was a large variety of goods produced, from meat to corn and wool, and the village became one of the first to have organized export of goods to the neighbouring villages and regions, in addition to providing for themselves. The number of farms kept growing, and at its peak in 1822, the village had twenty-one separately registered farms. During the following years, as urbanisation began to affect the country in general, the number of farms and inhabitants began to decrease, and most of the smaller farms were incorporated into the larger ones. By 1850, the number of farms and inhabitants were 11 and 217, respectively, and by 1875, this number had shrunk to 9 and 174.

=== Shipping village (1850 onwards) ===
As the Industrial Revolution reached Norway in the 1850s, most of the inhabitants of the small farming villages left for the cities, Bergen and Christiania (now: Oslo) in particular, leaving the farms with a shortage of workers. The number of farms was shortened, with several farms merging or closing. Meanwhile, the introduction of new tools and machines, along with the villages prime location near the coast, opened up for a new industry: shipbuilding.

At the turn of the century, there was three main builders in Høylandsbygd, who all produced wooden fishing boats. By 1920, only two remained, and they merged to form a large ship building plant in central Høylandsbygd, where Eide Marine Services, the current incarnation of the plant, has its offices today. Continuing to produce wooden vessels, mainly for fishing, the plant produced 42 ships from 1920 to 1950, all by hand. The founder, Georg Eide Sr. (9 December 1896 – 16 October 1951), remained in charge of the company until his sudden death in 1951, resulting in temporary closure.. In 1955, the company was reformed as Georg Eides Sønner by his sons Gerhard and Johannes Eide.

They continued focus on building wooden vessels for the fishing industry, and during the first decade, the company grew fast. By the 1970s the company was one of the leading job suppliers in the local community, and by 1980, the number of inhabitants in the village had doubled. While the growth stagnated during the early 90s, the number of inhabitants has remained stable at above 400.

== Schools and services ==
The local elementary school, Hauge skule, was in operation from 1964 to 2011, with renovations in 1979 and 2004. Prior to 1964, the village had several small school houses, common in Norway at this time, from the late 18th century until 1964, when the new school was completed. In 2011, all pupils were moved to a new school that gathered all the pupils on Halsnøy, while the kindergarten service remained.

In addition to public school, the village has had a general store since 1955, and also had postal and banking offices until 1995, when services were centralized to Sæbøvik. The village has semi-hourly bus connections to the rest of the island of Halsnøya and to Kvinnherad Municipality.
