= Radiohola =

Coordinates: 59°46′47″N 5°48′25″E

Radiohòla (lit. 'the radio cave') is a natural shelter used by the Norwegian resistance during the Second World War. It served as a hiding place for a radio that brought news from the British, during a time of which radios were banned and the German occupants arrested and prosecuted those found in possession of one.

== History ==
=== Location ===
The cave is located on the island of Halsnøya, about 1.5–2 kilometres (0.93–1.24 mi) inland, on the top of a small clearing surrounded by forests, and cannot be seen from low ground, which made it an ideal hiding place for the resistance. Initially only accessible from the topside (making the cave virtually invisible even at close range), the rocks in front of the cave were removed in 1990, to make the cave more easily accessible for tourists and visitors. Until 2012, there was no road leading up to it, other than a small, unmarked path used by locals from 1945 and until today. During its use as a resistance shelter, users had to climb the hillside to access it. In 2012, the local community built a proper gravel road with parking spaces, leading up to the cave.

=== Prior to and during the Second World War ===
Very little concrete information of its use prior to the 1930s exists, but historians have speculated that the small clearing might have been a housing location during the 11th century–13th century. As the cave was part of larger farmlands in the area, it was used as a natural shelter for animals in the decades before the war.

After the occupation commenced in 1940, the Nazi German occupants banned the use of radios in Norway, to prevent people from getting news and information from British broadcasts. However, the resistance kept several radios hidden around in the country, one of which was kept in Radiohola, where the local resistance members would listen to news and spread them word-to-mouth. The news were also spread via ships that docked in the village, whom in return provided news from the rest of the country. Resistance member Thomas Hauge, when interviewed by NRK in 1990, gave many details on how the use of the radio was carried through. The radio used was battery powered, which meant that the resistance members had to carry heavy batteries up the hillside on every use. Usually, a group of 2–4 members would go on such missions, with three listening for news and the fourth standing guard. They would then bring the batteries back down, leaving the radio in the cave. During a particular cold winter, the batteries used for the radio were ruined by frost, and so Hauge and his fellow resistance members had to trade food and supplies for a new one, nearly revealing their involvement.

=== After the War ===
After the war ended in 1945, the cave remained untouched for a long time, while several locals frequently visited it. Little was done until 1990, when a memorial was built outside the cave. At the same time, a wooden platform and seating area were constructed, to allow memorial events and services to be held, as well as providing seating for tourists and other visitors. A reel-to-reel audio tape detailing the story of the cave was also opened, but destroyed by vandals only two years later, with the tapes and player being stolen. A secondary tape of the original recording was discovered in 2008, and promptly digitalized. It was then played for the first time in over fifteen years during the annual memorial service at the cave.

Today, the cave is one of the most popular tourist sites on Halsnøy, with several hundred visitors every month during the summer. The locals also use the cave frequently for outdoor arrangements, as well as an annual war memorial service held on the weekend closest to May 8, which is Liberation Day in Norway. In 2012, the local community built a proper gravel road with parking spaces, leading up to the cave, to allow for tourist buses and larger groups of visitors to see the cave.
