= Husnes Church =

Church in Vestland, Norway

- Husnes kyrkje
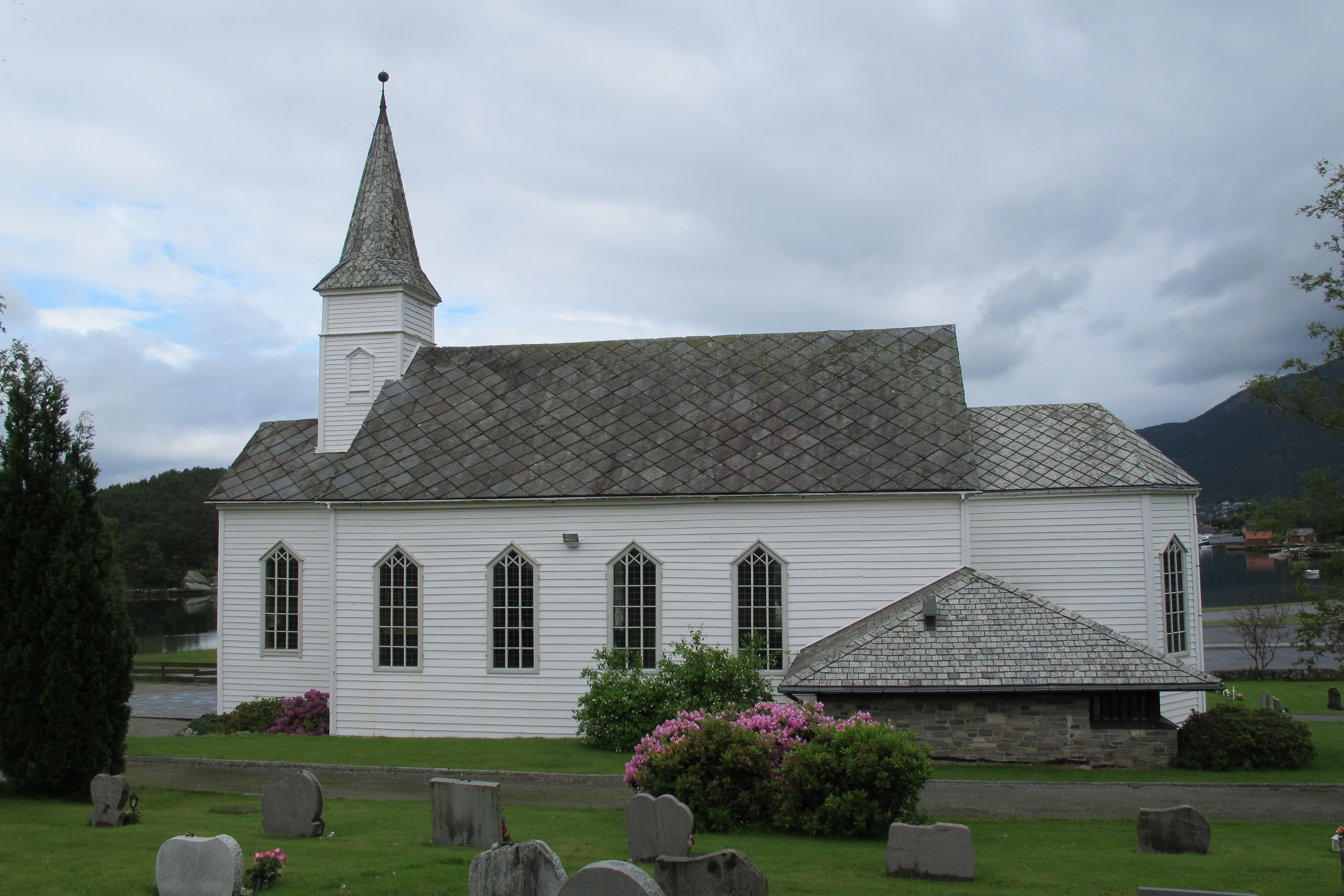
- View of the church
- Husnes Church
- 59°52′01″N 5°45′28″E
- Location: Kvinnherad Municipality, Vestland
- Country: Norway
- Denomination: Church of Norway
- Previous denomination: Catholic Church
- Churchmanship: Evangelical Lutheran

History
- Former name: Kaldestad kirke
- Status: Parish church
- Founded: 13th century
- Consecrated: 11 Sept 1874

Architecture
- Functional status: Active
- Architect: J. Utne
- Architectural type: Long church
- Completed: 1874 (152 years ago)

Specifications
- Capacity: 280
- Materials: Wood

Administration
- Diocese: Bjørgvin bispedømme
- Deanery: Sunnhordland prosti
- Parish: Husnes og Holmedal
- Norwegian Cultural Heritage Site
- Type: Church
- Status: Not protected
- ID: 84670

Husnes Church (Norwegian: Husnes kyrkje; historically: Kaldestad kirke) is a parish church of the Church of Norway in Kvinnherad Municipality in Vestland county, Norway. It is located in the village of Husnes. It one of the three churches for the Husnes og Holmedal parish which is part of the Sunnhordland prosti (deanery) in the Diocese of Bjørgvin. The white, wooden church was built in a long church design in 1874 using plans drawn up by the architect J. Utne. The church seats about 280 people.

== History ==
This church has existed since the Middle Ages. The earliest existing historical records of the church date to the year 1337, but it was not new that year. The first church was located at Kaldestad, about 2.5 kilometres (1.6 mi) southwest of the present site of the church. At that time, it was called Kaldestad Church Kallðestaða. That church was a wooden stave church that was likely built during the 13th century. During the 1630s or 1640s (definitely before 1660), the old church was torn down and replaced by a new timber-framed long church on the same site.

Prior to 1865, the church was owned by the Barony Rosendal, and in 1865, the church was sold to the parish. In 1874, the church was no longer able to fit the congregation and a new, larger church was needed. A new church was built about 2.5 kilometres (1.6 mi) to the northeast in the village of Husnes, and it was renamed Husnes Church. The lead builder was Askjell Aase and the church was designed by J. Utne. The new church was consecrated on 11 September 1874 and the old church was sold soon after. The old church was used by the new owner as a farm building until around 1900 when it was torn down. In 1960, the church was renovated by the architects Torgeir Alvsaker and Einar Vaardal-Lunde. This included new floors, interior decor, and the re-installation of the old pulpit from the old Kaldestad Church. In 1974, the church was enlarged by architect Peter Helland-Hansen. The choir and sacristies were opened up so that they became part of the nave. A new choir was built to the east of the nave and a new, large sacristy was built on the south side of the new choir. After the addition, the length of the 10-metre (33 ft) wide nave had increased from 12.1 metres (40 ft) to 15.8 metres (52 ft).

== See also ==
- List of churches in Bjørgvin
