= Halsnøy Tunnel =

Subsea road tunnel in Vestland, Norway

Halsnøy Tunnel Halsnøytunnelen
- Interactive map of Halsnøy Tunnel; Halsnøytunnelen

Overview
- Location: Kvinnherad Municipality, Norway
- Coordinates: 59°49′20″N 005°43′29″E
- Status: In use
- Route: Fv500
- Start: Sunde
- End: Sæbøvik

Operation
- Constructed: 2006-08
- Opened: 8 March 2008
- Operator: Statens vegvesen
- Traffic: Automotive
- Toll: 100 NOK (2008-18); 96.40 NOK (2018-19)

Technical
- Length: 4,120 m (13,520 ft)
- No. of lanes: 2
- Operating speed: 80 km/h
- Min elevation: −135 metres (−443 ft)
- Width: 7.5 metres (25 ft)

The Halsnøy Tunnel (Norwegian: Halsnøytunnelen) is a subsea road tunnel which connects the island of Halsnøya to the mainland in Kvinnherad Municipality in Vestland county in Norway. The northern end of the tunnel is at Sunde, just south of Husnes, and the southern entrance to the tunnel is just north of the village of Sæbøvik on Halsnøya. The 4,120-metre (13,520 ft) long tunnel reaches a depth of 135 metres (443 ft) below mean sea level. Located on County Road 500, it opened on 8 March 2008 and is as of May 2019 a toll road. The project included 2.2 kilometers (1.4 mi) of new road and cost 427 million Norwegian krone. Prior to the opening of this tunnel in 2008, the island of Halsnøy was the most populous island in Norway with no road connection. As an energy conservation measure, the tunnel is not fully illuminated at night, but rather when a vehicle approaches the tunnel, sensors turn on the lights, and then when all vehicles have exited the tunnel, the lights turn off again.

Initially planned as a tolled tunnel until 2023, it was later confirmed that the toll period would be extended until 2026 due to an increase in electric cars, which are toll-exempt in Norway. In May 2019, however, it was announced that the tunnel would have its remaining debt erased, and would become toll-free starting 6 September 2019, four years earlier than originally planned.
