= Hydro Husnes =

Norwegian aluminium company

- Company type: Allmennaksjeselskap
- Industry: Aluminium
- Founded: June 29, 1962
- Headquarters: Husnes, Norway
- Products: Extrusion ingots
- Revenue: NOK 1.8 billion (2010)
- Number of employees: 240 (2014)
- Parent: Norsk Hydro ASA(2014–present)

Hydro Husnes, formerly Sør-Norge Aluminium AS or SØRAL is one of seven aluminium producers in Norway.

The company is located in Husnes in Kvinnherad Municipality. The plant includes facilities for producing raw aluminium by electrolysis, casthouse for casting extrusion ingots, silos for storing aluminium oxide and a dock. The plant has 240 employees and a net production of 180,000 metric tons.

The company was acquired and became a subsidiary of Norsk Hydro on 1 November 2014.

== History ==
The idea of a smelting plant in Kvinnherad was conceived in 1959, after two seasons of very poor results for the local fishing industry. With the second wave of industrialization sweeping over Norway, it was decided that Husnes, a remote, flat area with good access to shipping lanes and access to the massive electric power needed, would be an ideal site for an aluminium smelting plant. Following a prolonged period of preparation and paperwork, Sør-Norge Aluminium, or SØRAL for short, was formed on June 29, 1962, with 1.000.000 NOK (10.500.000 NOK in 2014) in invested capital. Construction of the plant itself began the following year, and the first production line, "Hall A", opened for production in November 1965. The secondary production line, "Hall B", opened in March 1966, and in October 1966, the plant was officially opened by Sverre Walter Rostoft, the then-Norwegian minister for industry.

During the early years, the plant struggled with getting enough local manpower, which led to an increase in importing workers from other regions in Norway (especially from Finnmark, Troms) and other countries, like Denmark. At the time, the plant had 485 employees and produced 60.000 metric tonnes of aluminium every year.

Production remained stable during the 1970s, 80s and 90s, as the local community gradually expanded around the plant, which was the main source of income for most families in the area. During the next twenty years, Husnes grew from a small farming village to an expanded urban area with shopping centres, schools and sports facilities.

During the early 2000s, due to a gradual fall in aluminium prices, the production rate slowed down, and the company began suffering losses for the first time in forty years. Eventually, the situation led to the closure of Hall B in 2009, followed by severe downsizing, affecting almost half the workers on the plant. In 2014, following two years of speculation in whether the company would manage to recover, the plant was purchased by Norsk Hydro, renaming the plant Hydro Husnes.

In 2019, Norsk Hydro announced the upgrading of casting operations at the plant with an investment of NOK 150 million, enabling the plant to deliver a wider range of aluminum products geared towards the automotive market once the new facilities become operational in 2020.
