= Eid Church (Kvinnherad) =

Church in Vestland, Norway

- Eid kyrkje
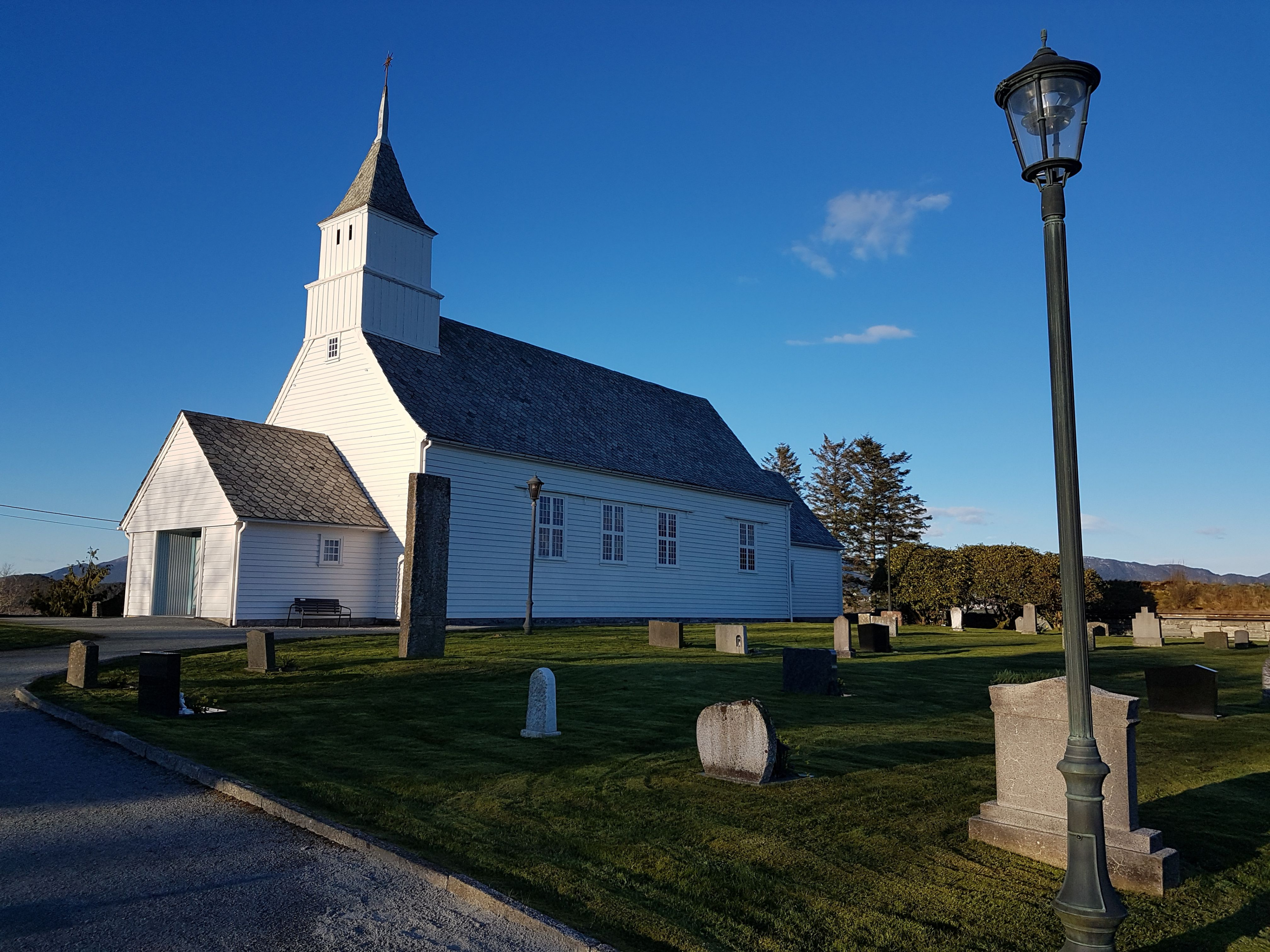
- View of the church
- Eid Church
- 59°47′14″N 5°41′40″E
- Location: Kvinnherad Municipality, Vestland
- Country: Norway
- Denomination: Church of Norway
- Previous denomination: Catholic Church
- Churchmanship: Evangelical Lutheran

History
- Status: Parish church
- Founded: 13th century
- Consecrated: 1824

Architecture
- Functional status: Active
- Architectural type: Long church
- Completed: 1824 (202 years ago)

Specifications
- Capacity: 180
- Materials: Wood

Administration
- Diocese: Bjørgvin bispedømme
- Deanery: Sunnhordland prosti
- Parish: Fjelberg og Eid
- Norwegian Cultural Heritage Site
- Type: Church
- Status: Automatically protected
- ID: 84064

Eid Church (Norwegian: Eid kyrkje) is a parish church of the Church of Norway in Kvinnherad Municipality in Vestland county, Norway. It is located in the village of Eidsvik. It is one of the two churches for the Fjelberg og Eid parish which is part of the Sunnhordland prosti (deanery) in the Diocese of Bjørgvin. The white, wooden church was built in a long church design in 1824 using plans drawn up by an unknown architect. The church seats about 180 people.

== History ==
There has been a church at Eidsvik since the Middle Ages due to its proximity to the Halsnøy Abbey. The earliest existing historical records of the church date back to the year 1337, but it was in use long before that time. The first church here was a wooden stave church that was probably built during the 13th century. This church was built about 50 metres (160 ft) west of the present church building. In 1618, the chancel was rebuilt.

In 1668, the old stave church was torn down and replaced with a new timber-framed, cruciform building on the same site. In 1696, the church underwent some repairs, including fixing the roof and tower. Around the year 1700, the ceiling of the choir was vaulted. In 1722, a new tower was built on the west end of the building. In 1724, the local parish priest, Erland Michelsen, purchased the church from the Crown during the great church auction that the King held to pay off debts from the Great Northern War. Later, the church was bought by the local parish.

In 1824, a new wooden long church was built about 50 metres (160 ft) to the east of the church. The new church was consecrated the same year by the Bishop Jacob Neumann. After the new church was completed, the old church was torn down. In 1891–1893, the church underwent a renovation which included a new church porch, new large windows in both long walls of the nave, and a second floor seating gallery along the north wall of the nave. Also, the floor of the choir was raised up. In 1952–1953, the interior of the church was restored and repainted.

== See also ==
- List of churches in Bjørgvin
