= Valen, Kvinnherad =

Village in Kvinnherad Municipality, Norway

Valen
- Village
- Interactive map of Valen
- Coordinates: 59.83169°N 5.78379°E
- Country: Norway
- Region: Western Norway
- County: Vestland
- District: Sunnhordland
- Municipality: Kvinnherad Municipality
- Elevation: 32 m (105 ft)
- Time zone: UTC+01:00 (CET)
  - Summer (DST): UTC+02:00 (CEST)
- Post Code: 5451 Valen

Valen is a village in Kvinnherad Municipality in Vestland county, Norway. The village is located on the mainland coast overlooking the island of Halsnøya to the south. The undersea Halsnøy Tunnel connects Halsnøya island to the mainland just to the west of Valen, in the neighboring village of Sunde.

The village has a shop, a kindergarten and primary school, and a mental hospital. There is also a horseback riding center, a marina, and Valen Church.

The village of Valen is grouped together with the neighboring village of Sunde by Statistics Norway which calls it the Sunde/Valen "urban area". The 1.92-square-kilometre (470-acre) urban area has a population (2025) of 2,303 and a population density of 1,199 inhabitants per square kilometre (3,110/sq mi).
