= Borgundøya =

Island in Vestland, Norway

Borgundøya Borgundo
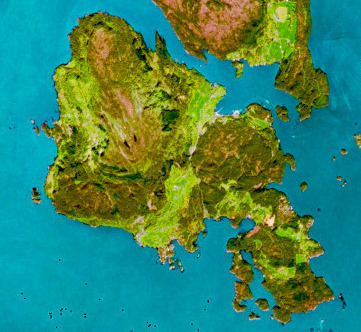
- Aerial view of the island as seen from Sentinel-2
- Interactive map of the island

Geography
- Location: Vestland, Norway
- Coordinates: 59.72763°N 5.67963°E
- Area: 11.4 km^{2} (4.4 sq mi)
- Highest elevation: 462 m (1516 ft)
- Highest point: Borgundnuten

Administration
- Norway
- County: Vestland
- Municipality: Kvinnherad Municipality

Demographics
- Population: 55 (2024)
- Pop. density: 4.8/km^{2} (12.4/sq mi)

Borgundøya or Borgundo is an island in Kvinnherad Municipality in Vestland county, Norway. The 11.4-square-kilometre (4.4 sq mi) island lies in the Hardangerfjorden, immediately south of the island of Fjelbergøya. The island has about 55 residents (in 2024), with about four larger village areas spread out around the island. The island is dominated by the 462-metre (1,516 ft) tall mountain Borgundnuten.

Borgundøya is only accessible by sea, either using ferries or personal boats. There are regular ferry routes from Borgundøya-Fjelbergøya-Halsnøya-Utbjoa, connecting several islands to the mainland at Utbjoa in Vindafjord Municipality.

== See also ==
- List of islands of Norway
