= Fjelbergøya =

Island in Vestland, Norway

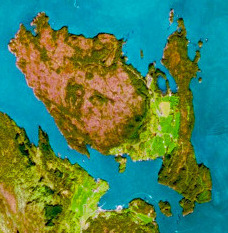
- A satellite image of the island
- Interactive map of the island

Geography
- Location: Vestland, Norway
- Coordinates: 59.74831°N 5.69353°E
- Area: 4.9 km^{2} (1.9 sq mi)
- Coastline: 19 km (11.8 mi)
- Highest elevation: 182 m (597 ft)
- Highest point: Påskåsen

Administration
- Norway
- County: Vestland
- Municipality: Kvinnherad Municipality

Fjelbergøya is an island in Kvinnherad Municipality in Vestland county, Norway. The 4.9-square-kilometre (1.9 sq mi) island lies on the south side of the Hardangerfjorden, between the islands of Borgundøya (to the south) and Halsnøya (to the northeast). These three neighboring islands are located very close together, only a few hundred meters separate them at certain points. Historically, this island was the centre of the old Fjelberg Municipality. Today, the islands of Fjelbergøya and Borgundøya are still often collectively referred to as Fjelberg.

The island is only accessible by the sea, either using ferries or personal boats. There are regular ferry routes from Leirvik-Borgundøya-Fjelbergøya-Halsnøya-Utbjoa, connecting several islands to the mainland at Utbjoa in Vindafjord Municipality.

Today, the island has about 13 full-time inhabitants (in 2023), but more than 100 seasonal inhabitants who stay there for longer periods during the summer. Most of the homes are in a small village area on the south side of the island near where Fjelberg Church is located.

== See also ==
- List of islands of Norway
