= Johannes Eide =

Norwegian businessman (1937–2025)

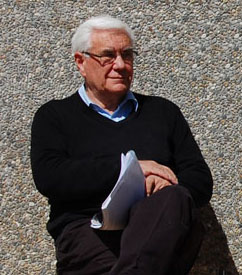
- Eide in 2010
- Born: 30 October 1937; Høylandsbygda, Norway
- Died: 24 June 2025 (aged 87); Stord, Norway
- Spouse: Aud Eide (1964–2025; his death)
- Children: 5

Johannes Malvin Georgsson Eide (30 October 1937 – 24 June 2025) was a Norwegian businessman and philanthropist. He was one of the founding owners of Eide Marine Services.

== Life and career ==
Eide was born in Høylandsbygda in 1937 as the second of six children. His father, Georg Eide Sr (1896–1951), ran a shipping plant not far from their home and Eide began work as a helper there at a very young age. In 1951, when Eide was two weeks shy of 14 years old, his father died suddenly, and so he left home to work to support his family. He returned four years later and formed his first company, Georg Eide's Sønner, with his brother Gerhard, naming the company in honour of their father. The company specialized in traditional ship building, focusing on wooden vessels, at the same location as the old shipping plant previously owned by their father. Eide ran this company until 1982, when he stepped down to take over the head position in Eide Contracting, one of the company's subsidiaries. The following year, Georg Eide's Sønner was declared bankrupt, following a series of economic problems.

Eide ran Eide Contracting until 1992, when the firm, along with its sister companies, was reorganized and renamed Eide Marine Services, which continues its operations today. During the 1970s and 1980s, he also ran a number of other companies, most of whom were subsidiaries of Eide Marine Services. He stepped down as CEO in 2001, with his eldest son Georg Jr. taking over. He continued having an active role in the company well into his 80s and still had an office at the same location until his death.

In 2005, Eide began construction of a replica of the Halsnøy Boat, a vessel discovered in 1896 that was dated to being from before the Viking age, around 300 A.D, based on reconstructed drawings made in the 1930s. The full-scale replica was finished in 2008, alongside several small-scale models that were gifted to companies and institutions that helped finance the project.

In 2006, Eide was awarded the Royal Norwegian Order of St. Olav for his work to preserve the Norwegian shipbuilding and coastal history and culture, and for his work with the local environment and culture.

In 2023, Eide opened a museum in his hometown celebrating and displaying Norwegian coastal history and traditions. Among the displayed items are several reconstructed historical vessels, wartime relics and items, and a large collection of machinery and electronics. In his speech during the opening day, Eide also revealed that a large majority of the items came from his own personal collection that he had gathered during the previous sixty years.

=== Personal life and death ===
Eide met his wife, Aud, at a young age and they married in 1964. He lived in his hometown of Høylandsbygda his entire life.

Eide died while hospitalised on 24 June 2025, at the age of 87. While he had been sick for some time, his death was sudden and unexpected.
