= Sæbøvik =

Village in Kvinnherad Municipality, Norway

- Village
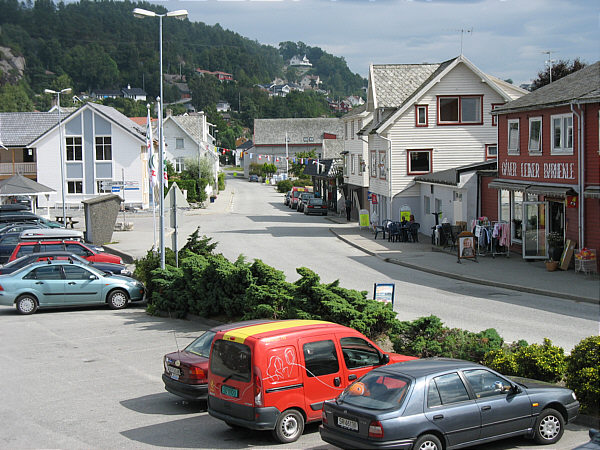
- View of the village
- Interactive map of Sæbøvik
- Coordinates: 59.79415°N 5.7097°E
- Country: Norway
- Region: Western Norway
- County: Vestland
- District: Sunnhordland
- Municipality: Kvinnherad Municipality

Area
  - Total: 0.66 km^{2} (0.25 sq mi)
- Elevation: 3 m (9.8 ft)

Population (2025)
  - Total: 554
  - Density: 839/km^{2} (2,170/sq mi)
- Time zone: UTC+01:00 (CET)
  - Summer (DST): UTC+02:00 (CEST)
- Post Code: 5454 Sæbøvik

Sæbøvik is a village in Kvinnherad Municipality in Vestland county, Norway. The village is located on the narrow, western part of the island of Halsnøya, about 6 kilometres (3.7 mi) west of the village of Høylandsbygda and immediately east of the village of Eidsvik. The village is located at the southern end of the Halsnøy Tunnel.

The 0.66-square-kilometre (160-acre) village has a population (2025) of 554 and a population density of 839 inhabitants per square kilometre (2,170/sq mi). This makes it the largest urban area on the island, followed by the neighboring village of Eidsvik.
