= Eidsvik, Vestland =

Village in Kvinnherad Municipality, Norway

Eidsvik
- Village
- Interactive map of Eidsvik
- Coordinates: 59.79138°N 5.68009°E
- Country: Norway
- Region: Western Norway
- County: Vestland
- District: Sunnhordland
- Municipality: Kvinnherad Municipality

Area
  - Total: 0.47 km^{2} (0.18 sq mi)
- Elevation: 22 m (72 ft)

Population (2025)
  - Total: 440
  - Density: 936/km^{2} (2,420/sq mi)
- Time zone: UTC+01:00 (CET)
  - Summer (DST): UTC+02:00 (CEST)
- Post Code: 5455 Halsnøy Kloster

Eidsvik is a village in Kvinnherad Municipality in Vestland county, Norway. The village is located on the northwestern end of the island of Halsnøya, just west of the village of Sæbøvik. The village lies on a thin, narrow isthmus-like peninsula sticking out into the Hardangerfjorden.

Eid Church is located in this village, and the church serves the whole island of Halsnøya. Eidsvik Skipsbyggeri, a ship building facility is also located in this village. The village is most notable for being the site of the historic Halsnøy Abbey which are located in the western part of the village.

The 0.47-square-kilometre (120-acre) village has a population (2025) of 440 and a population density of 936 inhabitants per square kilometre (2,420/sq mi). This makes it the second largest urban area on the island of Halsnøya (the largest is Sæbøvik which is located just to the east).
