= Fjelberg Church =

Church in Vestland, Norway

- Fjelberg kyrkje
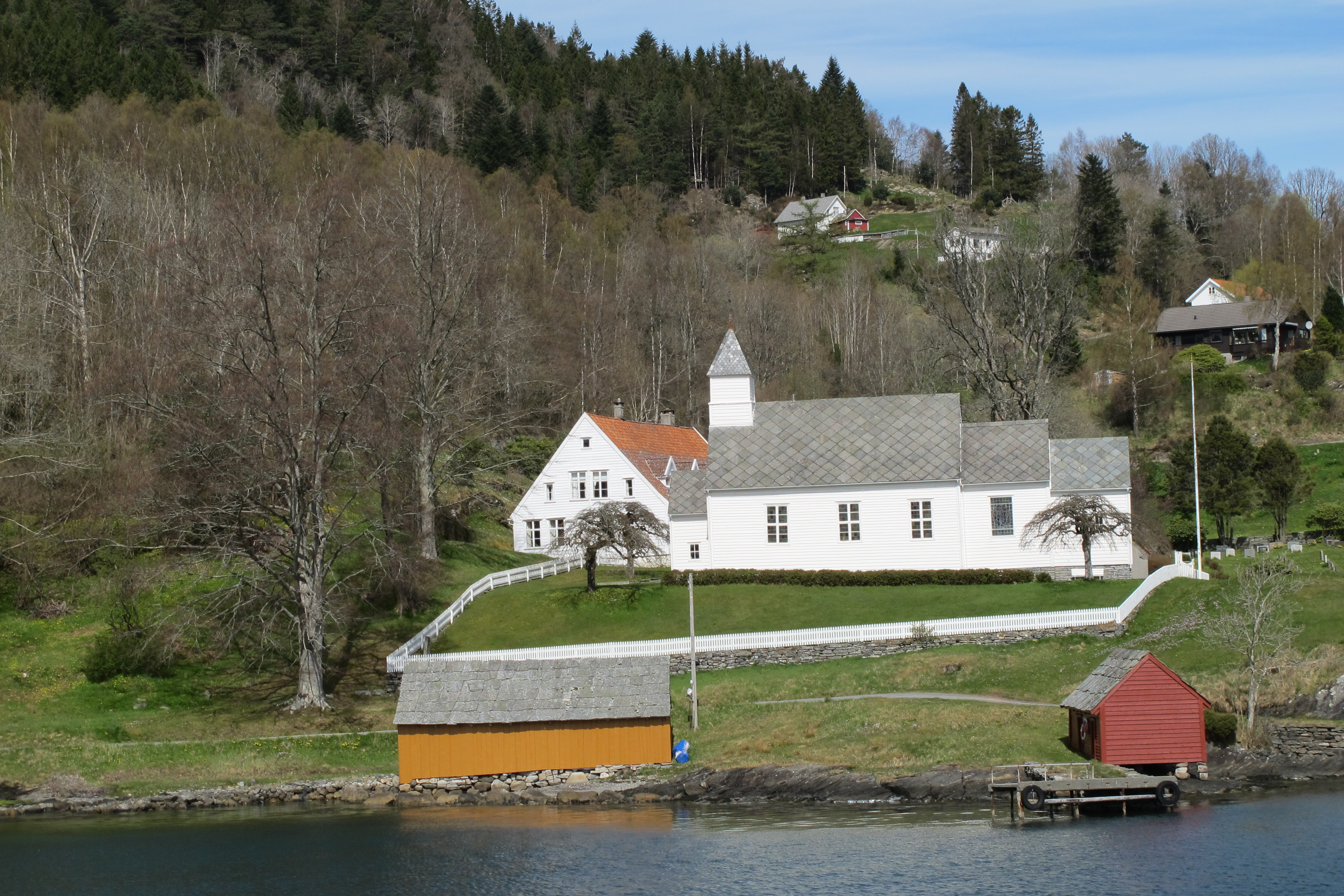
- View of the church
- Fjelberg Church
- 59°44′19″N 5°42′25″E
- Location: Kvinnherad Municipality, Vestland
- Country: Norway
- Denomination: Church of Norway
- Previous denomination: Catholic Church
- Churchmanship: Evangelical Lutheran

History
- Status: Parish church
- Founded: 13th century
- Consecrated: 1722

Architecture
- Functional status: Active
- Architectural type: Long church
- Completed: 1722 (304 years ago)

Specifications
- Capacity: 160
- Materials: Wood

Administration
- Diocese: Bjørgvin bispedømme
- Deanery: Sunnhordland prosti
- Parish: Fjelberg og Eid
- Norwegian Cultural Heritage Site
- Type: Church
- Status: Automatically protected
- ID: 84145

Fjelberg Church (Norwegian: Fjelberg kyrkje) is a parish church of the Church of Norway in Kvinnherad Municipality in Vestland county, Norway. It is located on the small island of Fjelbergøya. It is one of the two churches for the Fjelberg og Eid parish which is part of the Sunnhordland prosti (deanery) in the Diocese of Bjørgvin. The white, wooden church was built in a long church design in 1722 using plans drawn up by an unknown architect. The church seats about 160 people.

== History ==
There has been a church on the island of Fjelbergøya since the Middle Ages. The earliest existing historical records of the church date to the year 1561, but it was in use before that time. That first church was a wooden stave church that was likely built during the 13th century. In 1618, the church was renovated and it got a new floor, new windows, and a new pulpit. In 1627–1629, the church got a new tower. In 1638, the church porch was rebuilt. In 1721, the church was described as "an old and decrepit stave church where there is great danger to its life, especially when the wind blows hard" (Norwegian: Een gammel og i Grund forraadnet Stave Kirche, hvor udj Tienisten med allerstørste LifsFare forettes, og i sær naar det blæser Noget hart). Due to its poor condition, the church was torn down in 1722 and replaced by a new timber-framed long church, about 5 to 10 metres (16 to 33 ft) further to the west of where the old church stood.

In 1814, this church served as an election church (Norwegian: valgkirke). Together with more than 300 other parish churches across Norway, it was a polling station for elections to the 1814 Norwegian Constituent Assembly which wrote the Constitution of Norway. This was Norway's first national elections. Each church parish was a constituency that elected people called "electors" who later met together in each county to elect the representatives for the assembly that was to meet at Eidsvoll Manor later that year.

In 1862, there was discussion of replacing the church, but instead it was decided to simply refurbish the old church. The chancel floor was raised up, new windows were installed, and the chancel arch was replaced. Another renovation was completed in 1939 which included removing the second floor seating gallery along the north wall of the nave. In 1969, a sacristy was built on the east side of the choir.

== See also ==
- List of churches in Bjørgvin
