= Halsnøya =

Island in Vestland county, Norway

Halsnøya Halsnøy
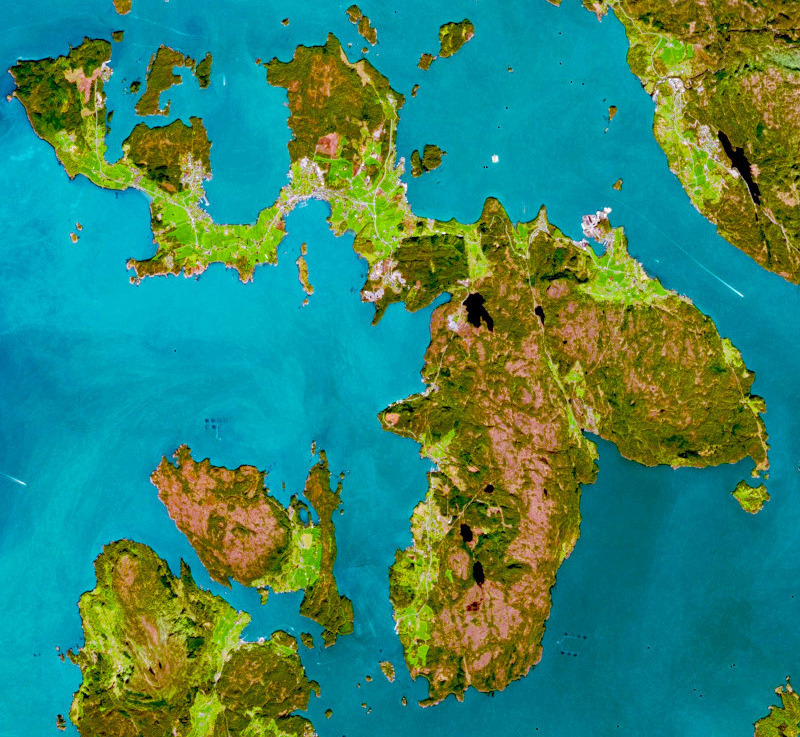
- Aerial view of the island as seen by Sentinel-2
- Interactive map of the island

Geography
- Location: Vestland, Norway
- Coordinates: 59.76598°N 5.7808°E
- Area: 38 km^{2} (15 sq mi)

Administration
- Norway
- County: Vestland
- Municipality: Kvinnherad Municipality

Demographics
- Population: 2657 (2024)
- Pop. density: 70/km^{2} (180/sq mi)

Halsnøya is an island in Kvinnherad Municipality in Vestland county, Norway. The 38-square-kilometre (15 sq mi) island lies between the Hardangerfjorden and Skånevikfjorden. The island has about 2,600 inhabitants (2024) and it is the most populated island in Kvinnherad Municipality. Prior to 2008, it was the most populated island in Norway without a direct connection to land, but the Halsnøy Tunnel opened that year, finally connecting it to the mainland by road. There is a regular ferry connection from southern Halsnøya to the neighboring islands of Fjelbergøya and Borgundøya, located just south of Halsnøya.

== History ==
The island was the site of the Halsnøy Abbey (closed in 1536), which once was one of the richest monasteries in Norway. Today, it is a highly popular tourist attraction. In 1896, one of the oldest boats recovered in Norway was found in the Toftevåg bay on the north side of the island. It was reconstructed to full-scale in 2006, and a monument was erected at the location of the recovery.

== Urban areas and industry ==
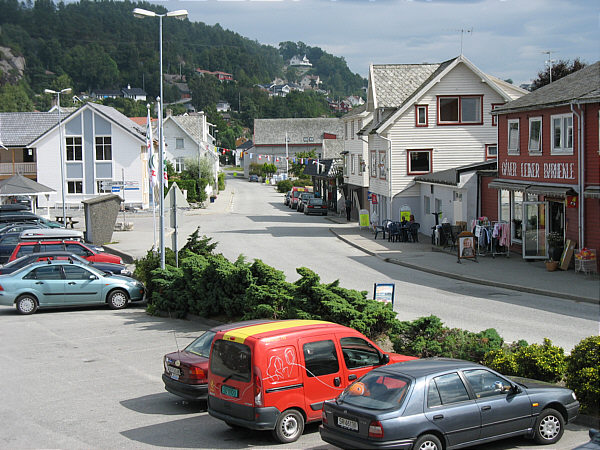
Halsnoey-25-k6

Halsnøya is usually divided into two unofficial zones by its locals: "utøyo" (lit. 'the outer island') and "innøyo" (lit. 'the inner island'). The "outer island" district consists of the villages of Sæbøvik and Eidsvik, located on the narrow northwestern part of the island. The "inner island" district is usually considered as the village area of Høylandsbygda and the larger, more rural, and rugged southeastern part of the island. Høylandsbygda is one of Western Norway's shipping capitals.

== Tourism and places of interest ==
Halsnøy is a popular place for tourists, especially from Germany and the Netherlands. Some of its most popular tourism attractions include Radiohola, the Halsnøy Abbey, and the Høylandsbygd shipping mural.

== Notable people ==
Some famous people from Halsnøya include:

- Tor Bjarne Bjelland, a drummer for Trucks and Robert Post
- Johannes Eide, a shipping magnate and decorated local activist
- Bjarte Agdestein, one of the creators of Oscar-winning short film The Danish Poet

== See also ==
- List of islands of Norway
