= Halsnøy Abbey =

Building in Kvinnherad, Vestland, Norway

Coordinates: 59°47′49″N 5°39′21″E

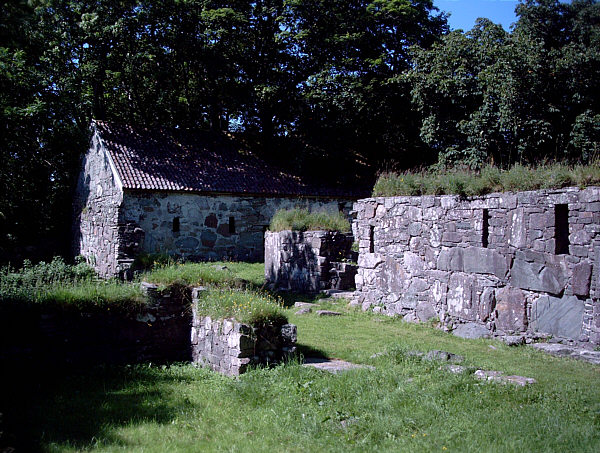
Halsnøy Abbey ruins

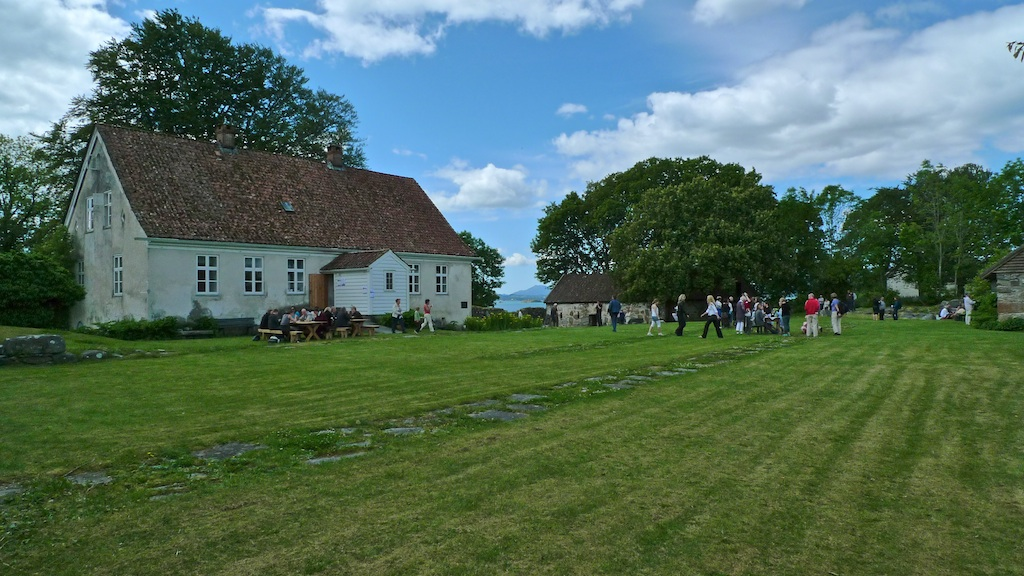
Main building of Halsnøy Abbey

Halsnøy Abbey (Norwegian: Halsnøy kloster) was a house of Augustinian Canons located on the island of Halsnøya on the Hardangerfjord at Kvinnherad Municipality in Vestland county, Norway.

== History ==
Halsnøy Abbey was one of the richest monasteries in medieval era Norway. The monastery is believed to have been founded in 1163 or 1164 by jarl Erling Skakke (1115–1179) as an inducement to Archbishop Øystein to crown Erling's seven-year-old son, Magnus Erlingsson, who reigned as King of Norway from 1161 to 1184.

The new foundation attracted many generous endowments and soon became one of the wealthiest in Norway. The buildings were severely damaged in a fire about a hundred years later, and were rebuilt in Gothic style about 1300.

The monastery was dissolved in 1536 during the Reformation and its lands and assets were confiscated by the Crown. For over 200 years it was administered as state property, but in 1758 the estate was bought by the chamberlain Andreas Juel, in whose family it remained until 1956. Lt. Andreas Juel, a descendant of the purchaser, demolished the remaining monastic buildings in about 1840 and built a new house from the stone in 1841.

In 1956 the site was bought by Sunnhordland Museum which has conserved the building remains. Previously known as Sunnhordland Folkemuseum, Sunnhordland Museum operates from administration offices at Stord and serves as the historic-cultural museum for all eight municipalities in the region of Sunnhordland.

Archaeological studies were conducted on site by architect Gerhard Fischer during 1938-1939 and by Hans-Emil Lidén between 1961-1963. Parts of the west wing with the abbey are preserved as ruins. Halsnøy is very unusual among Norwegian monastic sites in that what principally survives is not the principal monastic buildings (church, chapter house, etc.), but the smaller ancillary buildings. These survive at only two other pre-Reformation monastic sites in the country: Selje Abbey (Selje kloster) in the district of Nordfjord and Hovedøya Abbey (Hovedøya kloster) in Oslo.

== Other Sources ==
- Halsnøy kloster Norges klostre i middelalderen (in Norwegian)
- Halsnøy kloster Sunnhordland Museum (in Norwegian)

== Related reading ==
- Lidén, Hans-Emil; Ellen Marie Magerøy (1990) Norges Kircher (Oslo: Gyldendal)
