= Veggli =

Village in Buskerud, Norway

Coordinates: 60°03′N 9°09′E

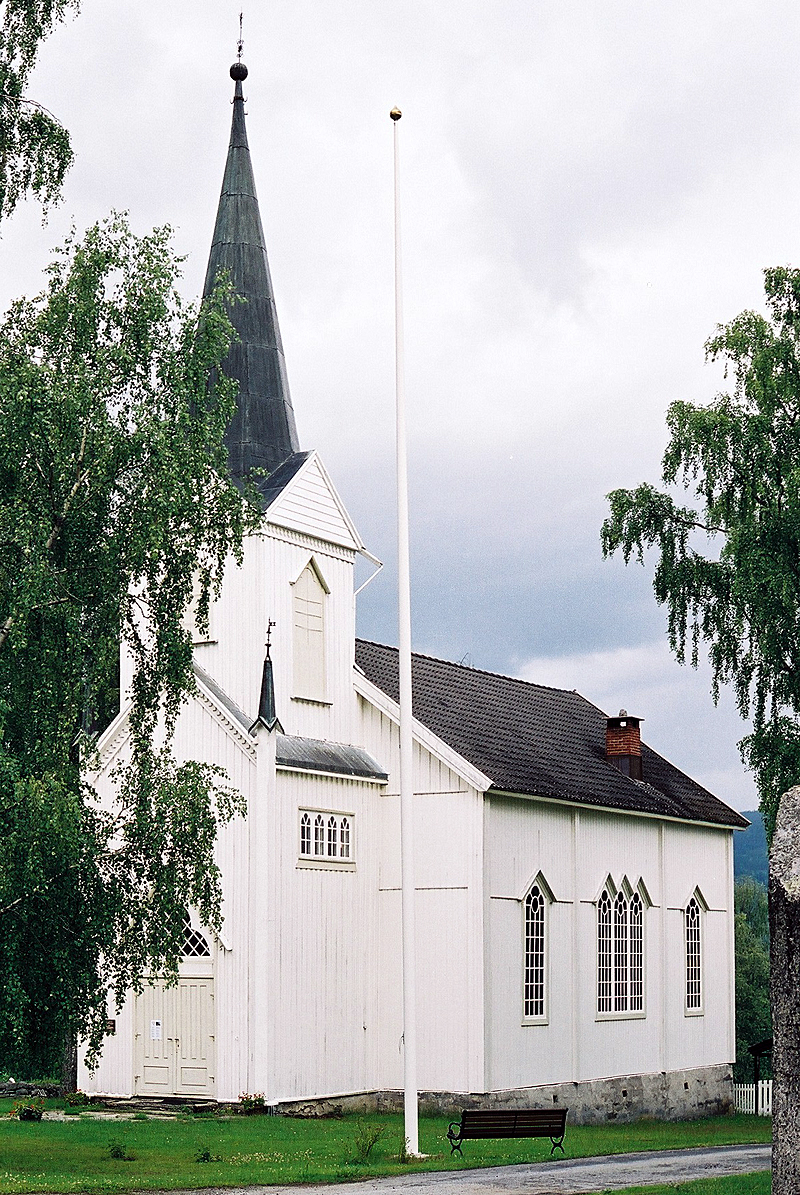
Veggli Church

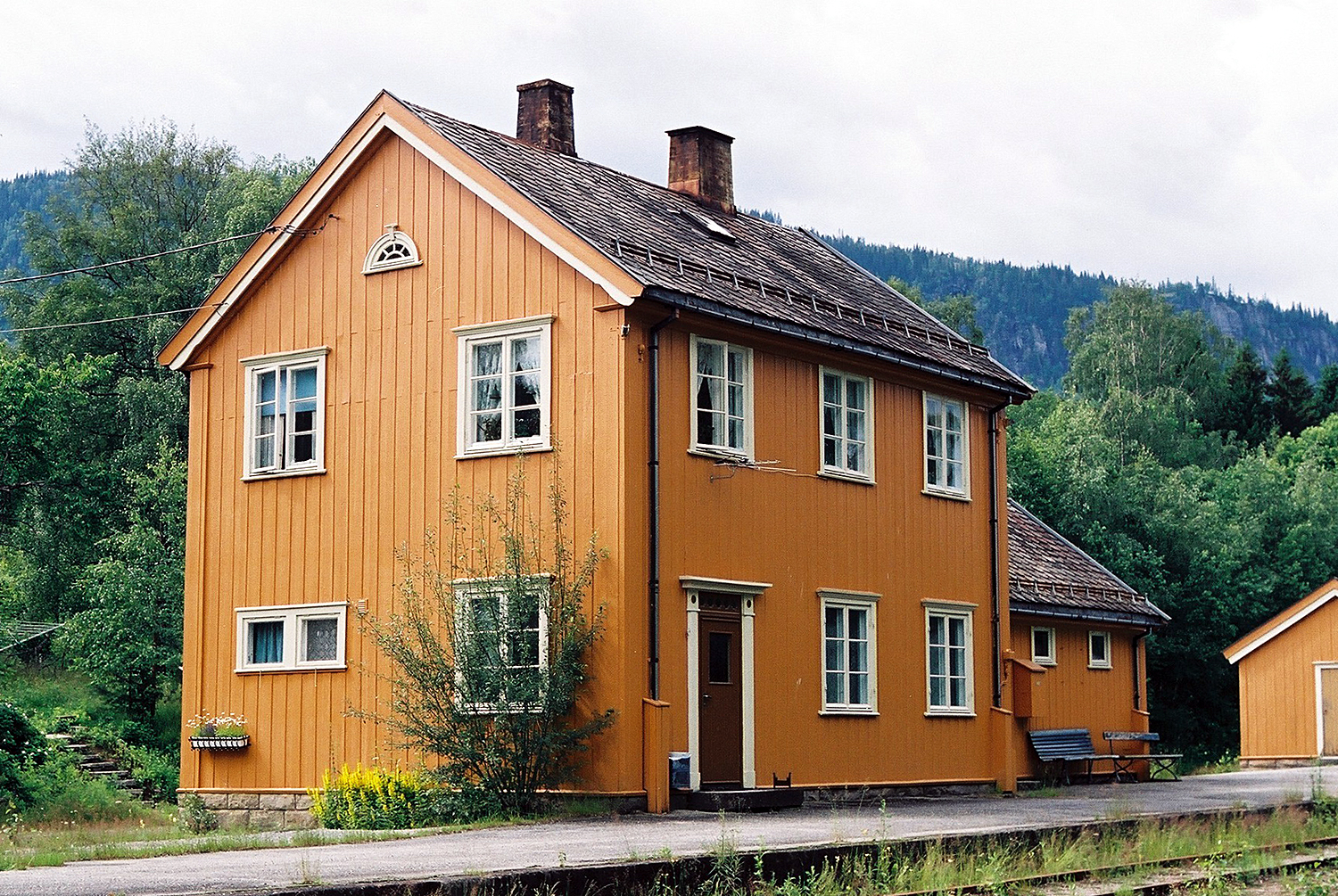
Veggli train station

Veggli is a village in Rollag Municipality, in the county of Buskerud, Norway.

Veggli is located about 66 kilometers north of Kongsberg. It is located in the traditional district and valley of Numedal. It is situated on the Numedalslågen River, near the mouth of Nørdsteåas estuary. Its population in 2005 was 292.

Veggli train station was on the Numedal Line. The line ran from Kongsberg to Rødberg in Nore og Uvdal Municipality. The line was officially opened in 1927. Passenger traffic on the track was closed in 1988. West from Veggli, the road goes over Vegglifjell where Veggli Lodge and Veggli Skisenter are located. Further the road leads to the villages of Austbygdi and Tessungdalen in Tinn Municipality.

Veggli Church (Veggli kirke) is part of the Kongsberg prosti (deanery). It was constructed of wood and designed by the architect Christian Heinrich Grosch (1801–1865). The church has 160 seats. The church dates from 1859 and has protected status listed.

== Climate ==
Climate data for Veggli II 1991–2020 (275 m, average high/low 2007-2025)
Month	Jan	Feb	Mar	Apr	May	Jun	Jul	Aug	Sep	Oct	Nov	Dec	Year
Mean daily maximum °C (°F)	−1.1 (30.0)	0.7 (33.3)	5.9 (42.6)	10.9 (51.6)	16.3 (61.3)	20.7 (69.3)	22.2 (72.0)	20.1 (68.2)	16.1 (61.0)	9.2 (48.6)	2.9 (37.2)	−0.7 (30.7)	10.3 (50.5)
Daily mean °C (°F)	−4.1 (24.6)	−3.7 (25.3)	−0.1 (31.8)	4.4 (39.9)	9.4 (48.9)	13.6 (56.5)	15.9 (60.6)	14.2 (57.6)	10.2 (50.4)	4.3 (39.7)	−0.4 (31.3)	−3.9 (25.0)	5.0 (41.0)
Mean daily minimum °C (°F)	−7.9 (17.8)	−7 (19)	−3.7 (25.3)	−0.3 (31.5)	4 (39)	8.4 (47.1)	10.7 (51.3)	9.3 (48.7)	6.3 (43.3)	1.5 (34.7)	−2.8 (27.0)	−7.1 (19.2)	0.9 (33.7)
Average precipitation mm (inches)	50 (2.0)	31 (1.2)	35 (1.4)	37 (1.5)	59 (2.3)	77 (3.0)	95 (3.7)	95 (3.7)	78 (3.1)	76 (3.0)	71 (2.8)	47 (1.9)	751 (29.6)
Source 1: yr.no (mean, precipitation)
Source 2: seklima (average high/low)

== Notable people ==
- Ole Knudsen Nattestad and Ansten Nattestad - pioneer founders of the Jefferson Prairie Settlement in the state of Wisconsin.
- Sigurd Pettersen - Famous ski jumper who represents the local sports team Rollag og Veggli.
- Ragnar Tveiten - former Norwegian biathlete and world champion
- Kjell Hovda - former Norwegian biathlete
