= Austbygda =

Austbygda, Austbygd, Austbygdi, or Austbygde are place names in the Norwegian language. The prefix "aust-" means "eastern" and the root word "bygd(a/e/i)" refers to a "village" or "rural countryside". The name may refer to the following places in Norway:

== Places ==
- Austbygde, Telemark, a village in Tinn Municipality in Telemark county, Norway
- Austbygde Church, a church in Tinn Municipality in Telemark county, Norway
- Austbygdi, Osterøy, a village in Osterøy Municipality in Vestland county, Norway
- Nordre Austbygda, a village in Søndre Land Municipality in Innlandet county, Norway
- Søre Austbygda, a village in Søndre Land Municipality in Innlandet county, Norway

== See also ==
- Nordbygda (disambiguation)
- Sørbygda (disambiguation)
- Vestbygda (disambiguation)
