= Dale Church =

Dale Church may refer to several churches:

- Dale Church (Fjaler), a church in Fjaler Municipality in Vestland county, Norway
- Dale Church (Luster), a church in Luster Municipality in Vestland county, Norway
- Dale Church (Vaksdal), a church in Vaksdal Municipality in Vestland county, Norway
- Norddal Church, also known as Dale Church, a church in Fjord Municipality in Møre og Romsdal county, Norway

== See also ==
- Dal Church, a church in Tinn Municipality in Telemark county, Norway
- The Dales United Reformed Church, Nottingham, England
