= Snowshoe Thompson =

American cross-country skier (1827–1876)

John Albert Thompson
- Snowshoe Thompson
- Born: Jon Torsteinsson Rue; April 30, 1827; Austbygde, Telemark, Norway
- Died: May 15, 1876 (aged 49); Genoa, Nevada, U.S.
- Other name: Snowshoe Thompson

John Albert Thompson (born Jon Torsteinsson Rue; April 30, 1827 – May 15, 1876), nicknamed Snowshoe Thompson, an early resident of the Sierra Nevada of Nevada and California, was a Norwegian-American considered to be the father of California skiing.

== Background ==
Jon Torsteinsson Rue was born on the Rue farm near Austbygde in Tinn prestegjeld in Telemark county, Norway. He was the son of Torsten Olsen Rue (ca. 1760–1829) and Gro Jonsdatter Håkaland (1781-ca. 1846). His father died when Thompson was two years old.

In 1837, at the age of 10, Thompson came to America with his mother, settling first on a farm in Norway, LaSalle County, Illinois at the Fox River Settlement. The family subsequently moved on the Norwegian immigrant settlement in Shelby County, Missouri which was under the leadership of Cleng Peerson.

In 1839, they were joined by Thompson's brother Tostein (1819-1880) and sister Kari (born 1822). In 1840, they followed Hans Barlien and moved to the Sugar Creek Settlement in Lee County, Iowa.

In 1846, Thompson and his brother Tostein came to Dane County, Wisconsin. In 1851, Thompson drove a herd of milk cows to California and settled in Placerville. For a short while he mined in Kelsey Diggins, Coon Hollow and Georgetown. With the small amount he saved, he bought a small ranch at Putah Creek, in the Sacramento Valley. In 1860, Thompson homesteaded a 160-acre ranch in Diamond Valley, south of Genoa in California's Alpine County.

== Mail delivery ==
Between 1856 and 1876, he delivered mail between Placerville, California and Genoa, Nevada and later Virginia City, Nevada. Despite his nickname, he did not make use of the snowshoes that are native to North America, but rather would travel with what the local people applied that term to: ten-foot (over 3-meter) skis, and a single sturdy pole generally held in both hands at once. He knew this version of cross-country skiing from his native Norway, and employed it during the winter as one of the earlier pioneers of backcountry skiing in the United States. Thompson delivered the first silver ore to be mined from the Comstock Lode. Later he taught others how to make skis, as well as the basics of their use. Despite his twenty years of service as a subcontractor, he was never paid for delivering the mail.

Thompson typically made the eastward trip in three days, and the return trip in two days. Thompson carried no blanket and no gun; he claimed he was never lost even in blizzards. A rescue attributed to him was that of a man trapped in his cabin by unusually deep snow. Thompson reached him, realized the damage to the man's legs from frostbite was sufficient to kill him, skied out to get chloroform, skied back in with it, and delivered the chloroform in time to save him.

Thompson traveled the Star routes along Old Emigrant Road and later Big Tree Route. The route known as "Johnson's Cutoff" was a pathway first marked by John Calhoun Johnson, an early explorer and first man to deliver mail over the Sierra Nevada mountain range. Today this approximates the route of U.S. Route 50 as it winds its way from Placerville, California to South Lake Tahoe.

== Personal life ==
In 1866, Thompson married Agnes Singleton (1831-1915) who had come to America from England. The Thompsons' only child, Arthur Thomas, was born on February 11, 1867. From 1868 to 1872 Thompson served on the Board of Supervisors of Alpine County, and was a delegate to the Republican State Convention in Sacramento in 1871. In spite of a resolution sent to Washington, D.C. by the Nevada Legislature, the many political contacts he had gathered, and a trip to Washington, D.C. in 1872, Snowshoe Thompson was never paid for his services delivering the United States Mail.

Snowshoe Thompson died of appendicitis which developed into pneumonia on May 15, 1876. His grave can be seen in Genoa, Nevada, in Carson Valley, east of Lake Tahoe. His son Arthur died two years later of diphtheria, and was buried next to his father at the cemetery in Genoa.

== Legacy ==
- In 1885, a marble stone was erected on the site of Snowshoe's grave. Engraved are a pair of crossed skis and the phrase "Gone but not forgotten."
- In 2001, a statue of Snowshoe Thompson was erected on the grounds of the Mormon Station State Historic Park in Genoa, Nevada.
- Monuments to the memory of Snowshoe Thompson can also be found at Carson Pass, Boreal Ski Resort, Palisades Tahoe and Carthay Circle, Los Angeles.
- A memorial stone in Austbygdi, Telemark in Norway where he was born.
- Thompson Peak is a 9,340-ft summit in the Sierra Nevada that is named for him.

== Thompson in popular culture ==
- In 1954, the character actor Don Kennedy (born 1920) played Thompson in an episode of the syndicated western anthology series, Death Valley Days, hosted by Stanley Andrews. In the story line, Thompson comes to the aid of Sierra Nevada miners in Placerville and other mining camps to carry the U. S. mail in snowy winters. Despite his enthusiasm for the job, he was never compensated. The lack of funds caused a delay into his planned marriage to Agnes (Jane Hampton).
- Country and folk singer Johnny Horton in 1956 recorded "Snowshoe Thompson", a song about Thompson's adventures as a mail carrier. The song is track 4 on the compilation: Johnny Horton Makes History.
- In 1971, Louis L'Amour, in his novel Tucker wrote about snowshoes, "out California way, Snowshoe Thompson had made himself a reputation carrying the mail on them" (p. 162).
- Scottish rocker Alex Harvey covered the song on his posthumous 1982 release, Soldier On The Wall.
- In 2008 Norwegian author Terje Nordberg wrote a Donald Duck comic strip (Donald Duck & Co), which Norwegian artist Arild Midthun illustrated. The title "Snowshoe Duckson" makes an obvious reference.
- In 2020, Colorado band Wildfire Stampout recorded “Snowshoe” on their album “Stampout Songstravaganza”. The song is based on Snowshoe Thompson's reliability during his cross-mountain deliveries.

== See also ==
- John Lewis Dyer

== Other sources ==
- Bjork, Kenneth (1956) Snowshoe Thompson: Fact and Legend (Northfield, MN: Norwegian-American Historical Association, Vol XIV, pg 62–88)

== Related reading ==
- Stoutenburg, Adrien, Laura Nelson Baker (1957) Snowshoe Thompson (Scribner; Book Club) ISBN 978-0684209586
- Tortorich, Frank (2015) John A. "Snowshoe" Thompson, Pioneer Mail Carrier of the Sierra (Pronghorn Press) ISBN 978-1941052105
