= Skirveggin =

Mountain in Telemark, Norway

- Skirveggen
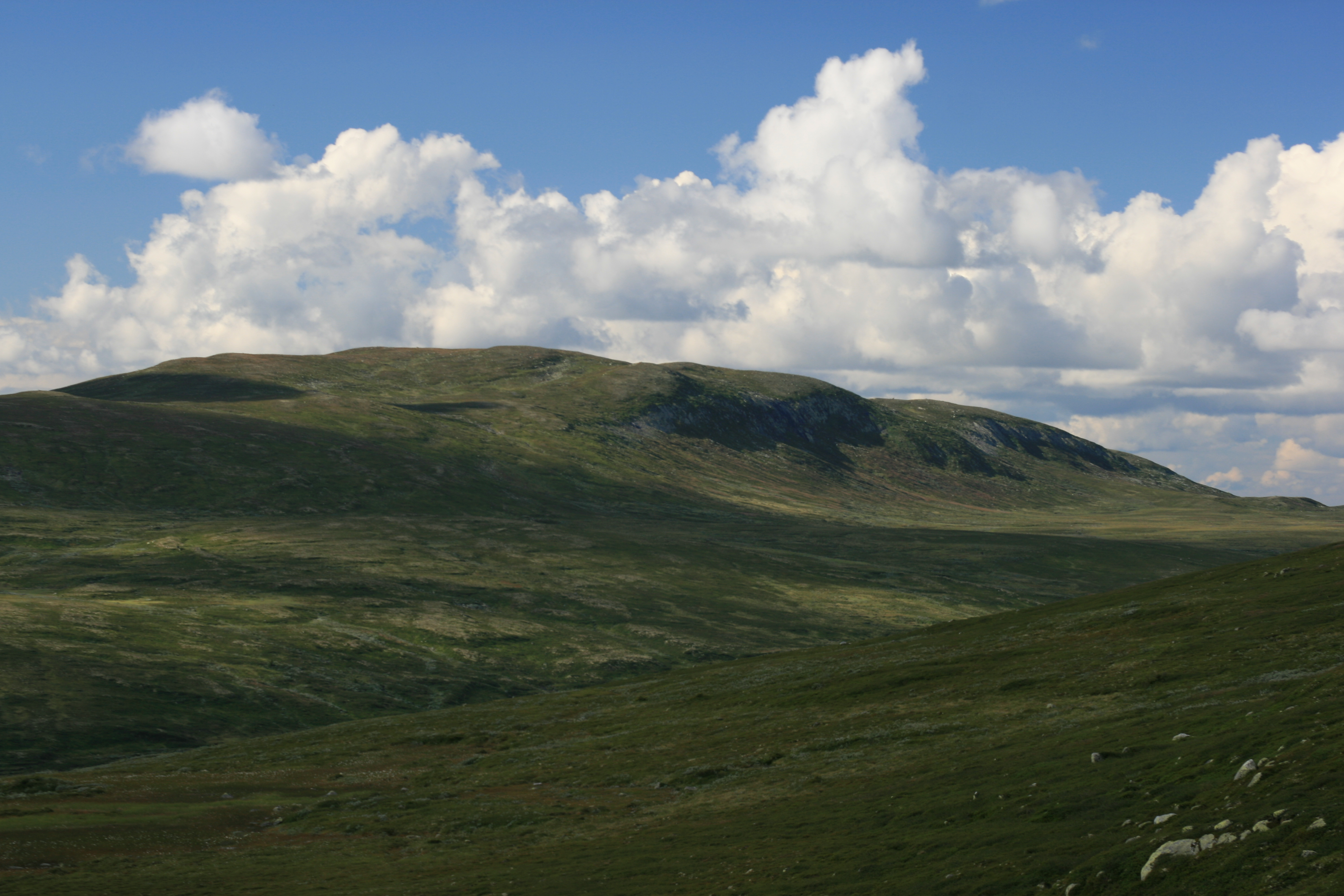

Highest point
- Elevation: 1,380 m (4,530 ft)
- Prominence: 178 m (584 ft)
- Isolation: 30 metres (98 ft)
- Coordinates: 60°06′29″N 8°55′28″E

Geography
- Location: Telemark, Norway
- Parent range: Vegglifjell

Skirveggin is a mountain in Tinn Municipality in Telemark county, Norway. The 1,380-metre (4,530 ft) tall mountain is located about 13 kilometres (8.1 mi) northeast of the village of Tinn Austbygd and about 8 kilometres (5.0 mi) to the southwest of the village of Nore. It is the highest mountain in the Vegglifjell mountain range which lies along the border of Telemark and Buskerud.

The summit lies in Tinn Municipality in Telemark county, but the border with Nore og Uvdal Municipality in Buskerud county is only 100 metres (330 ft) to the northeast of the peak. The mountain has a steep east flank, the other sides are gently sloped. It has a flat summit, where the actual high point is difficult to make out.

== See also ==
- List of mountains of Norway by height
