= Veggli Church =

Church in Buskerud, Norway

- Veggli kirke
- View of the church
- Veggli Church
- 60°02′35″N 9°08′47″E
- Location: Rollag Municipality, Buskerud
- Country: Norway
- Denomination: Church of Norway
- Previous denomination: Catholic Church
- Churchmanship: Evangelical Lutheran

History
- Status: Parish church
- Founded: c. 13th century
- Consecrated: 1859

Architecture
- Functional status: Active
- Architect: Christian Grosch
- Architectural type: Long church
- Completed: 1859 (167 years ago)

Specifications
- Capacity: 160
- Materials: Wood

Administration
- Diocese: Tunsberg
- Deanery: Kongsberg prosti
- Parish: Veggli
- Norwegian Cultural Heritage Site
- Type: Church
- Status: Listed
- ID: 85789

Veggli Church (Norwegian: Veggli kirke) is a parish church of the Church of Norway in Rollag Municipality in Buskerud county, Norway. It is located in the village of Veggli. It is the church for the Veggli parish which is part of the Kongsberg prosti (deanery) in the Diocese of Tunsberg. The white, wooden church was built in a long church design in 1859 using plans drawn up by the architect Christian Heinrich Grosch. The church seats about 160 people.

== History ==
The first church in Veggli was a wooden stave church that was possibly built in the 13th century. It was located just south of the present-day Veggli Church. It had a rectangular nave about 5.7 metres (19 ft) long and 4.6 metres (15 ft) wide with walls that were 3.75 metres (12.3 ft) high. There was a narrower chancel that was about 2 metres (6 ft 7 in) wide. The original chancel was probably demolished in 1684, when the church received a new, wooden chancel. The church had been expanded a few years earlier and was expanded again in 1704–08 with a transept, so that it became a cruciform church. After the mid-18th century, the church received a new church porch.

By the 1850s, the church had become too small for the congregation, so the parish made plans for a new church. The new Veggli Church was designed by Christian Heinrich Grosch in 1856 and built by builder Ole Sjulsen Fjøslien Rostad in 1859 on a site just to the north of the old church. The new building was consecrated in 1859. It is a long church built using log construction with a west tower that is timber-framed. The old stave church was torn down in 1861.

== Media gallery ==
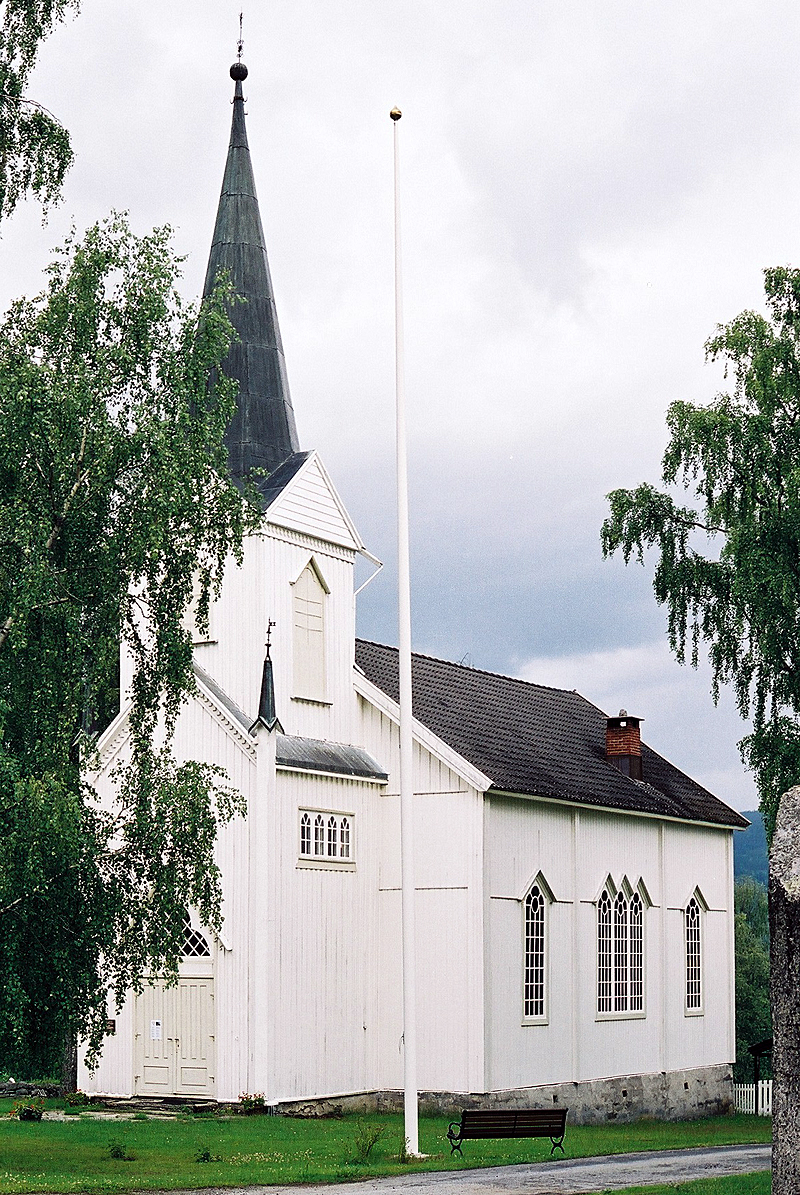

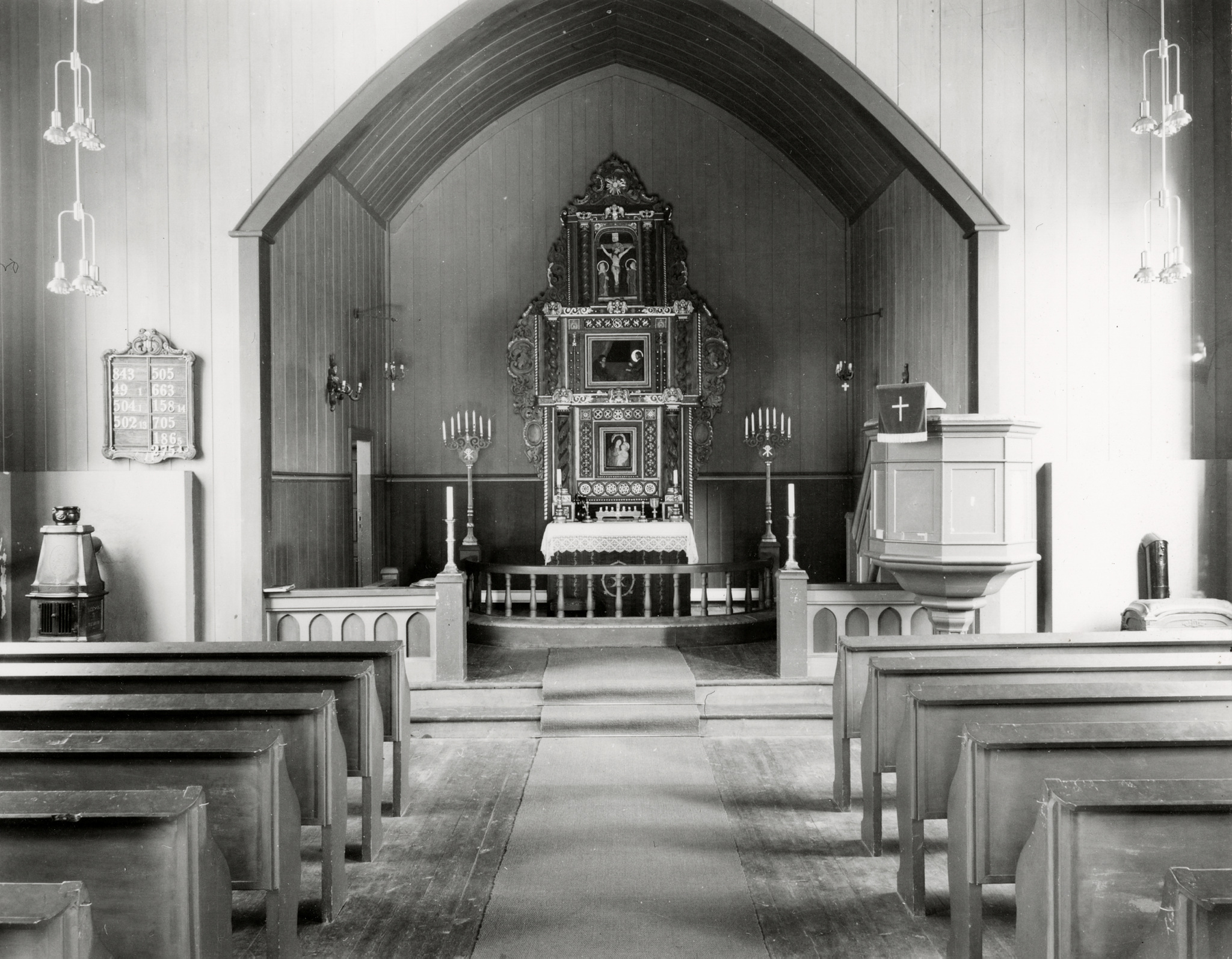

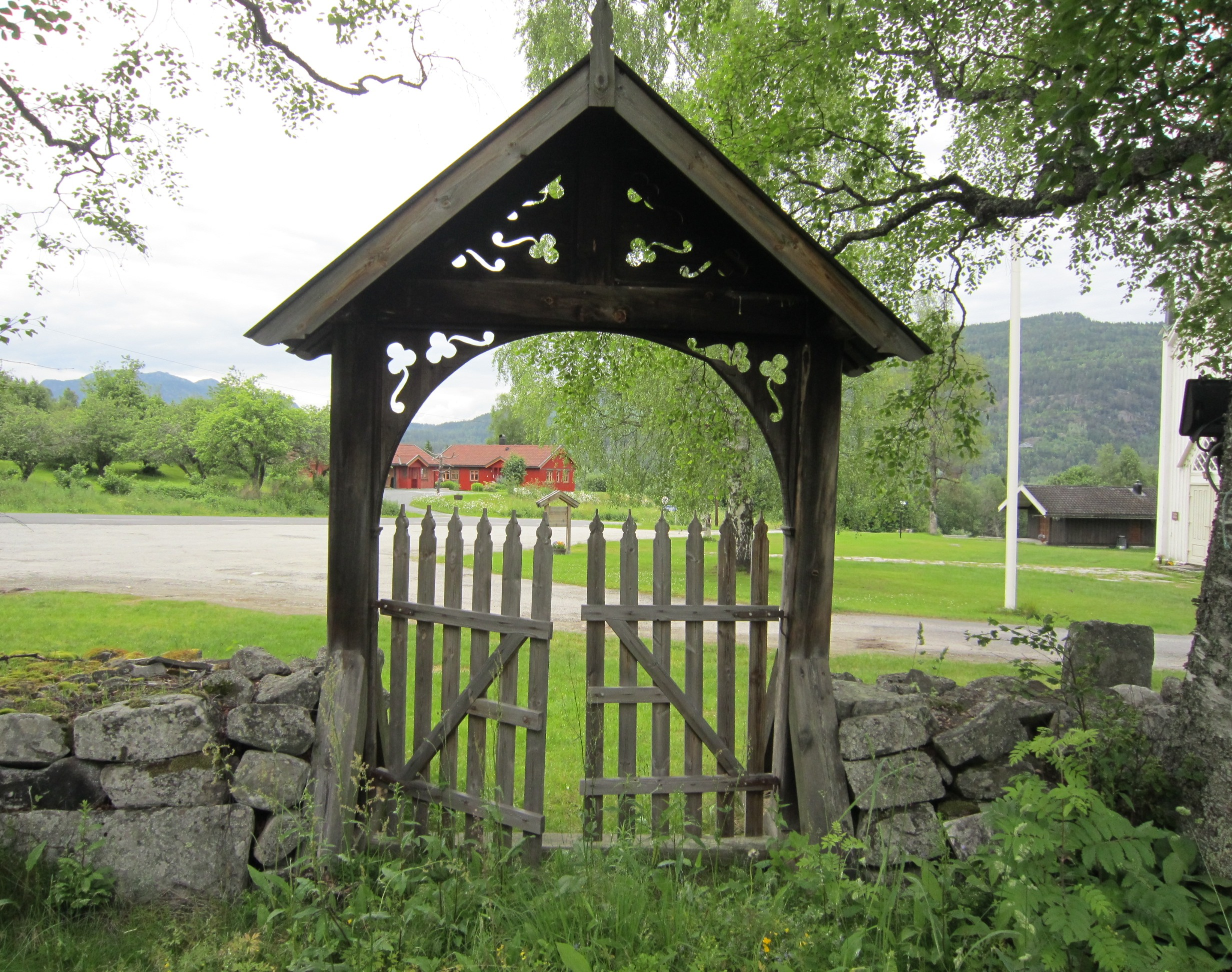

== See also ==
- List of churches in Tunsberg
