= Gunnar Odd Hagen =

Norwegian politician

Gunnar Odd Hagen (14 July 1921 – 6 October 1997) was a Norwegian politician for the Conservative Party.

He served as a deputy representative to the Parliament of Norway from Telemark during the terms 1969–1973 and 1973–1977. In total he met during 43 days of parliamentary session. He worked as a dentist in Tinn Municipality.
