= Nordbygda =

Nordbygda, Nordbygd, or Nordbygdi are place names in the Norwegian language. The prefix "nord-" means "northern" and the root word "bygd(a/i)" refers to a "village" or "rural countryside". The name may refer to the following places in Norway:

== Places ==
- Nordbygdi, Agder, a village in Bykle Municipality in Agder county, Norway
- Nordbygda, Buskerud, a village in Sigdal Municipality in Buskerid county, Norway
- Nordbygdi, Hjartdal, a village in Hjartdal Municipality in Telemark county, Norway
- Nordbygdi, Nissedal, a village in Nissedal Municipality in Telemark county, Norway
- Nordbygda, Oppland, a village in Nordre Land Municipality in Innlandet county, Norway
- Nordbygdi, Seljord, a village in Seljord Municipality in Telemark county, Norway
- Nordbygda, Vestland, a village in Samnanger Municipality in Vestland county, Norway

== See also ==
- Austbygda (disambiguation)
- Sørbygda (disambiguation)
- Vestbygda (disambiguation)
