= Reidar Engell Olsen =

Norwegian politician (1933–2016)

Reidar Engell Olsen (10 May 1933 – 18 June 2016) was a Norwegian politician for the Labour Party.

Olsen served as a deputy representative to the Parliament of Norway from Telemark during the terms 1969–1973 and 1973–1977. In total he met during 9 days of parliamentary session.

From 1973 to 1979, during Bratteli's Second Cabinet and Nordli's Cabinet, Engell Olsen was appointed State Secretary in the Ministry of Industry. He also served as mayor of Tinn Municipality.
