= Atrå =

Village in Tinn Municipality, Norway

Atrå Atraa (historic)
- Village
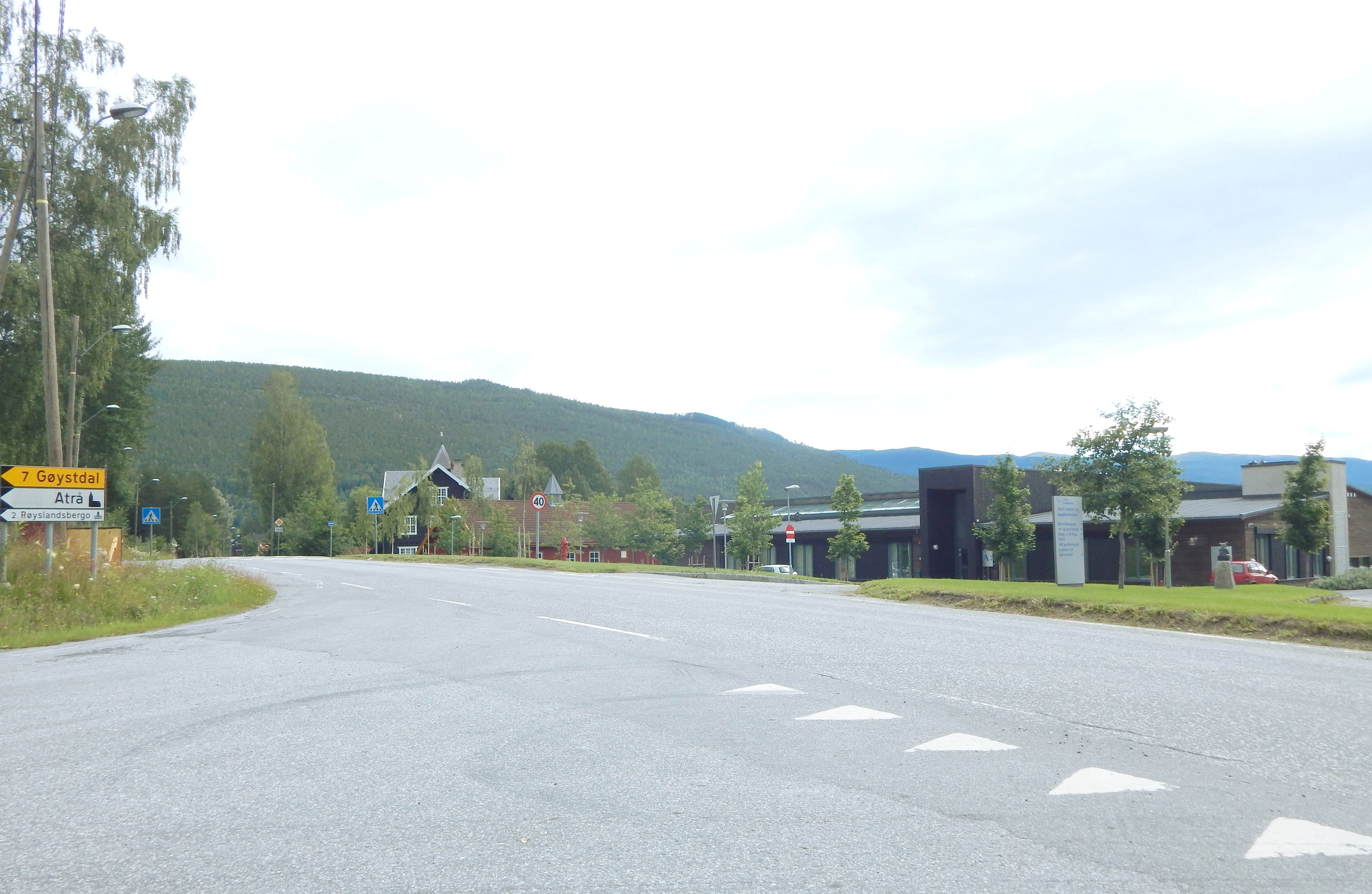
- View of the village
- Interactive map of Atrå
- Coordinates: 59.98814°N 8.73533°E
- Country: Norway
- Region: Eastern Norway
- County: Telemark
- District: Aust-Telemark
- Municipality: Tinn Municipality
- Elevation: 235 m (771 ft)
- Time zone: UTC+01:00 (CET)
  - Summer (DST): UTC+02:00 (CEST)
- Post Code: 3656 Atrå

Atrå is a village in Tinn Municipality in Telemark county, Norway. The village is located at the northwestern end of the large lake Tinnsjå, about 6 kilometres (3.7 mi) to the west of the village of Tinn Austbygd and about 12 kilometres (7.5 mi) to the north of the village of Miland. The village lies along the river Gøyst in the Gøystdalen valley which heads to the northwest from the shore of the lake.

The village has been a church site since the first Atrå Church was built as a stave church there before the year 1200. The present church building was completed on the same site in 1836.
