= Albert Sund =

Norwegian politician

Albert Reginald Sund (20 August 1884 – 1960) was a Norwegian trade unionist and politician for the Labour Party.

== Biography ==
He was born in Rjukan. He joined his first trade union in 1906, and chaired his local union for five years. Being a member of the Labour Party, he was a member of the executive committee of the municipal council of Tinn Municipality. He chaired the local party chapter Rjukan arbeiderforening from 1931 to 1932.

He sat on the supervisory council of the Norwegian Confederation of Trade Unions from 1920 to 1928, and also of Norges Bank. He chaired Øst-Telemark faglige Samorg from 1924 to 1927. From 1928 he was a board member of the Norwegian Union of Chemical Industry Workers.

He was taken into custody on 18 May 1914, since the labour movement in Rjukan held an anti-militaristic street demonstration on 17 May, the Norwegian Constitution Day. The parade escalated into riots as anti-demonstrators tried to get a hold of the anti-militarist banners. Laborers threw rocks at armed police. On 19 May fifty infantrymen were dispatched to Rjukan because of rumours that the prison would be stormed. As detention continued, some laborers wanted to instigate a general strike. Finally, in October Sund received his sentence. He was not imprisoned, but was fined of 100 kr.
