= Sørbygda =

Sørbygda, Sørbygd, or Sørbygdi are place names in the Norwegian language. The prefix "sør-" means "southern" and the root word "bygd(a/i)" refers to a "village" or "rural countryside". The name may refer to the following places in Norway:

== Places ==
- Sørbygda, Akershus, a village in Lørenskog Municipality in Akershus county, Norway
- Sørbygda, Stange, a village in Stange Municipality in Innlandet county, Norway
- Sørbygda, Vestland, a village in Etne Municipality in Vestland county, Norway
- Sørbygdi, Flå, a village in Flå Municipality in Buskerud county, Norway
- Ytre Sørbygda, a village in Snåsa Municipality in Trøndelag county, Norway
- Øvre Sørbygda, a village in Snåsa Municipality in Trøndelag county, Norway

== See also ==
- Nordbygda (disambiguation)
- Austbygda (disambiguation)
- Vestbygda (disambiguation)
