= Austbygde Church =

Church in Telemark, Norway

- Austbygde kyrkje
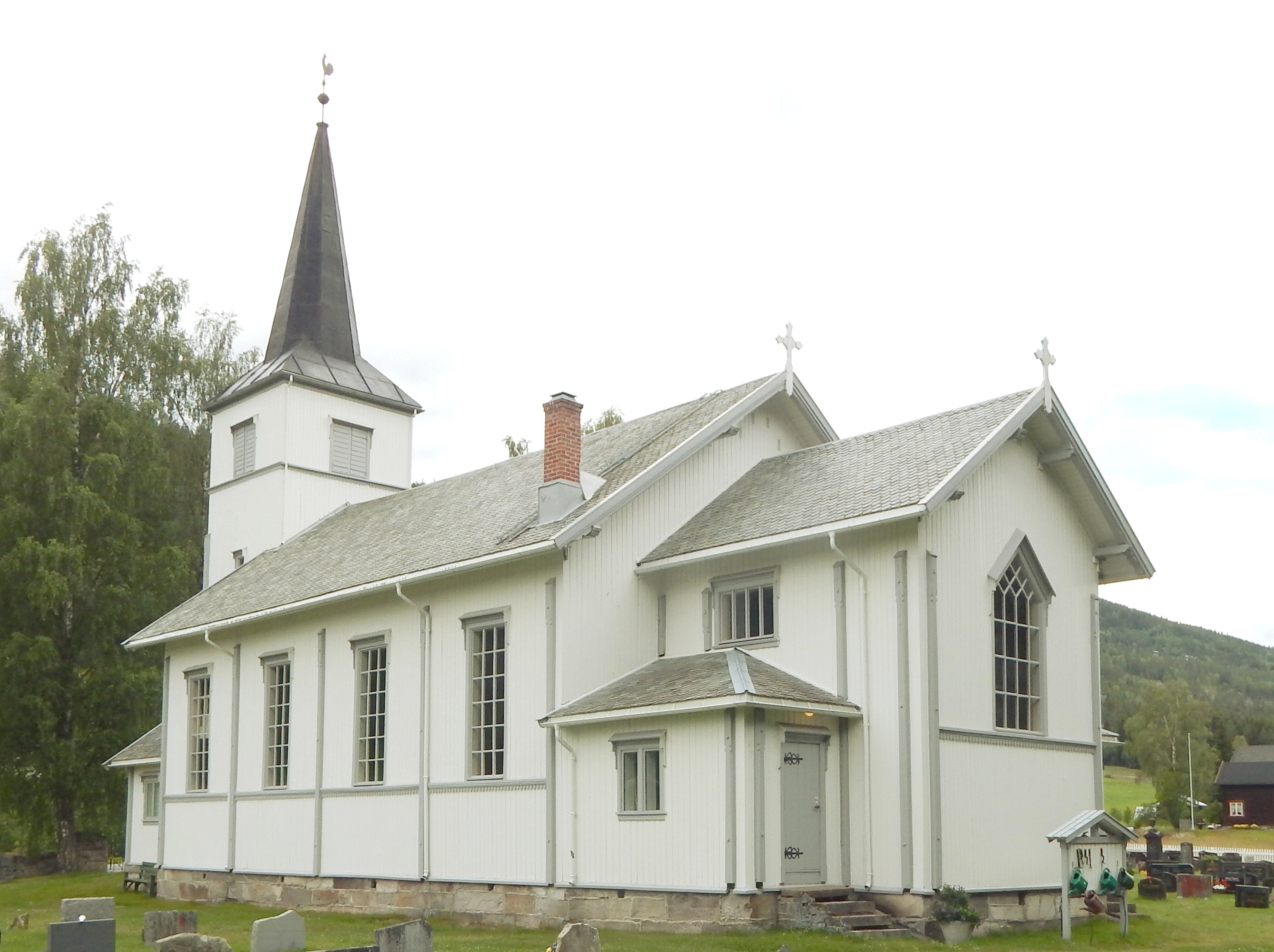
- View of the church
- Austbygde Church
- 60°01′46″N 8°49′35″E
- Location: Tinn Municipality, Telemark
- Country: Norway
- Denomination: Church of Norway
- Churchmanship: Evangelical Lutheran

History
- Status: Parish church
- Founded: 1888
- Consecrated: 23 Nov 1888

Architecture
- Functional status: Active
- Architect: Jacob Wilhelm Nordan
- Architectural type: Long church
- Completed: 1888 (138 years ago)

Specifications
- Capacity: 300
- Materials: Wood

Administration
- Diocese: Agder og Telemark
- Deanery: Øvre Telemark prosti
- Parish: Tinn
- Norwegian Cultural Heritage Site
- Type: Church
- Status: Not protected
- ID: 83822

Austbygde Church (Norwegian: Austbygde kyrkje) is a parish church of the Church of Norway in Tinn Municipality in Telemark county, Norway. It is located in the village of Austbygdi. It is one of the churches for the Tinn parish which is part of the Øvre Telemark prosti (deanery) in the Diocese of Agder og Telemark. The white, wooden church was built in a long church design in 1888 using plans drawn up by the architect Jacob Wilhelm Nordan. The church seats about 300 people.

== History ==
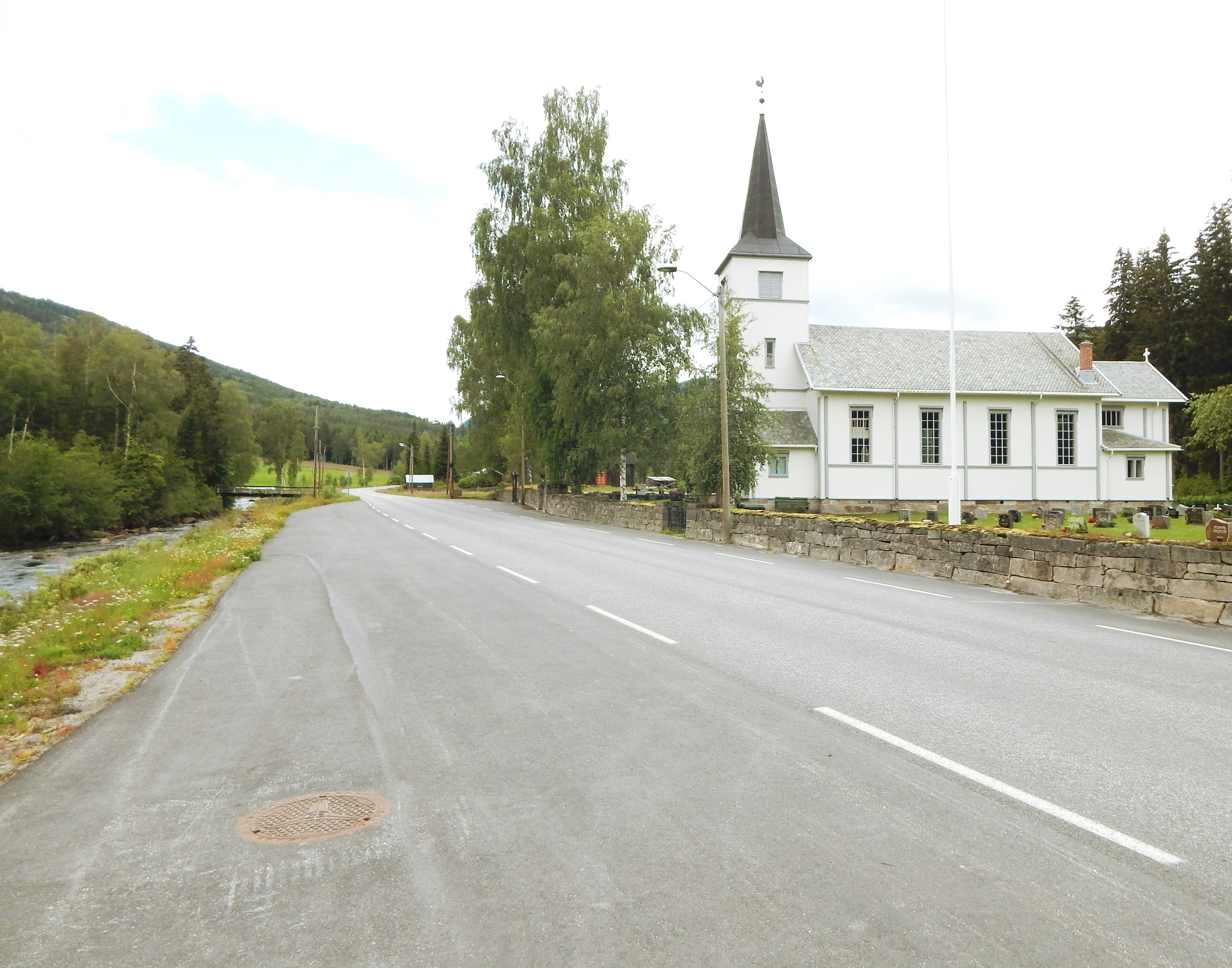
View of the church

Austbygde was formerly part of the Atrå Church parish, but it became its own church parish starting on 1 January 1888. Planning for a new church to serve the newly created parish began right away. The new church was designed by Jacob Wilhelm Nordan and the builder Gulbrand Johnsen from Nes in Romerike was hired to lead the construction. The new Austbygde Church was consecrated on 23 November 1888. It is a wooden long church with a west bell tower built with log construction. The rectangular choir on the east is surrounded by vestries. The church was renovated in 1933-1934 according to plans by Domenico Erdmann. The church was extensively restored in 1985–1988. During this renovation, a baptismal sacristy and bathroom was added on either side of the church porch and bell tower.

== See also ==
- List of churches in Agder og Telemark
