= Vestbygda =

Vestbygda, Vestbygd, or Vestbygdi are place names in the Norwegian language. The prefix "vest-" means "western" and the root word "bygd(a/i)" refers to a "village" or "rural countryside". The name may refer to the following places in Norway:

== Places ==
- Vestbygda or Jørstad, a village in Snåsa Municipality in Trøndelag county, Norway
- Vestbygd, Agder, a village in Farsund Municipality in Agder county, Norway
- Vestbygda, Nordland, a village in Lødingen Municipality in Nordland county, Norway
- Vestbygdi, Osterøy, a village in Osterøy Municipality in Vestland county, Norway
- Vestbygda, Ringerike, a village in Ringerike Municipality in Innlandet county, Norway
- Vestbygdi, Voss, a village in Voss Municipality in Vestland county, Norway
- Vestbygda, Østre Toten, a village in Østre Toten Municipality in Innlandet county, Norway

== See also ==
- Nordbygda (disambiguation)
- Austbygda (disambiguation)
- Sørbygda (disambiguation)
