= Rjukan Church =

Church in Telemark, Norway

- Rjukan kirke
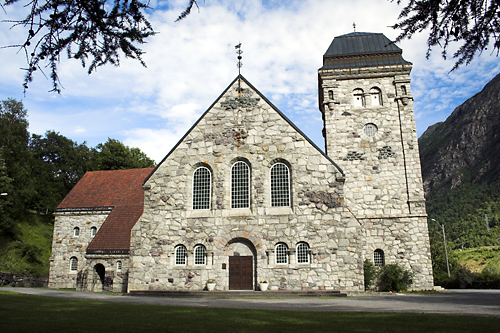
- View of the church
- Rjukan Church
- 59°52′46″N 8°36′27″E
- Location: Tinn Municipality, Telemark
- Country: Norway
- Denomination: Church of Norway
- Churchmanship: Evangelical Lutheran

History
- Status: Parish church
- Founded: 1915
- Consecrated: 21 Dec 1915

Architecture
- Functional status: Active
- Architect(s): Carl Berner (1915); Jørgen Berner (1915); Asbjørn Stein (1968)
- Architectural type: Long church
- Completed: 1915 (111 years ago)

Specifications
- Capacity: 350
- Materials: Stone

Administration
- Diocese: Agder og Telemark
- Deanery: Øvre Telemark prosti
- Parish: Rjukan
- Norwegian Cultural Heritage Site
- Type: Church
- Status: Not protected
- ID: 85305

Rjukan Church (Norwegian: Rjukan kirke) is a parish church of the Church of Norway in Tinn Municipality in Telemark county, Norway. It is located in the town of Rjukan. It is one of the churches for the Rjukan parish which is part of the Øvre Telemark prosti (deanery) in the Diocese of Agder og Telemark. The brown, stone church was built in a cruciform design in 1915 using plans drawn up by the architects Carl Berner and Johan Berner. The church seats about 350 people.

== History ==
The village of Rjukan began to grow quickly during the early part of the 20th century. In 1911 residents began working towards getting a church built in the village. In 1912, a closed architectural competition for the design of the new church was held with three participants. It was won by the brothers Carl Berner and Jørgen Berner. Originally, it was intended that the church should be built by the village square, but it ended up on the Einungsdalen estate near Ingolfsland. The new church was completed in 1915 and it was consecrated on 21 December 1915. The new church had a cruciform design and it was made out of natural stone. There was a large tower at the entrance on the southwest side.

In late-June 1927, there was torrential rain for a couple of weeks in the area. Floods and landslides made the village of Rjukan look like a battlefield, there were fatalities, and the rectory collapsed (but the priest's family had been evacuated) in a landslide that also pushed dirt and mud far up the church walls. On 26 March 1953, the ceiling collapsed inside the church. Fortunately, the church was empty when it happened. The church was then closed for several months while the roof was repaired. In February 1965, while the filming of the movie The Heroes of Telemark was in progress, the second floor gallery caught fire. It was thought that the fire had been extinguished, but it flared up again after the fire brigade left, and all combustible material inside the church burned, so that only the walls remained.

Asbjørn Stein was commissioned as the architect for the reconstruction. The tower was severely heat damaged and had to be largely rebuilt, but otherwise most of the walls were reused, and the church basically got the same exterior. However, the interior was designed quite differently, as they took the opportunity to turn the church into a more modern design with 350 seats. The old design had the church set up in a cruciform manner with the choir on the north transept. In the renovation, the old choir transept was rebuilt into a two-storey section where there is a congregation hall downstairs and a meeting room and kitchen on the second floor. The facility also houses some offices. The remaining part of the old nave was rebuilt as a more modern-looking long church design with a different east–west orientation. A new main entrance to the building was built on the west end of the new nave. The new church was re-consecrated on 28 April 1968.

== Media gallery ==
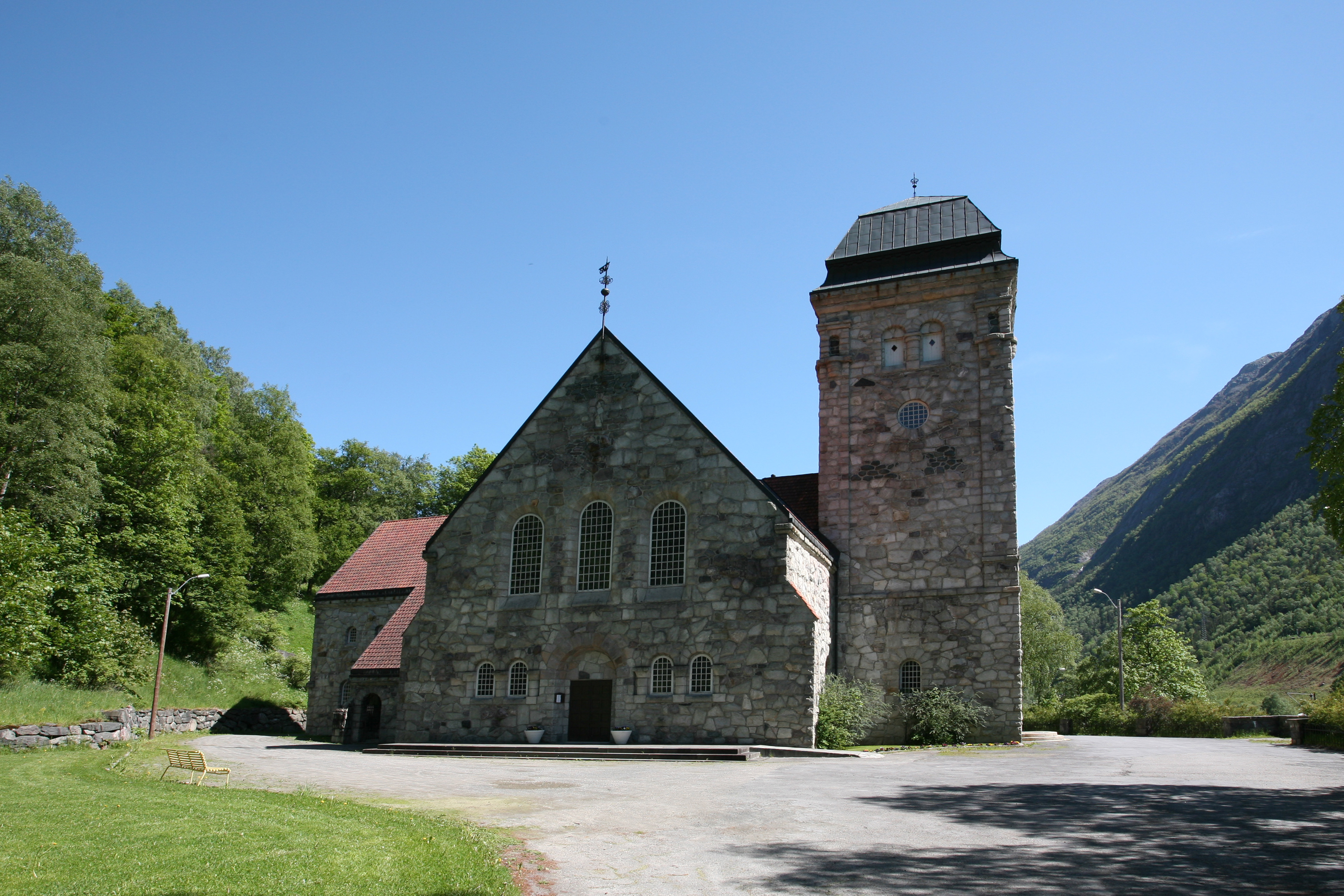

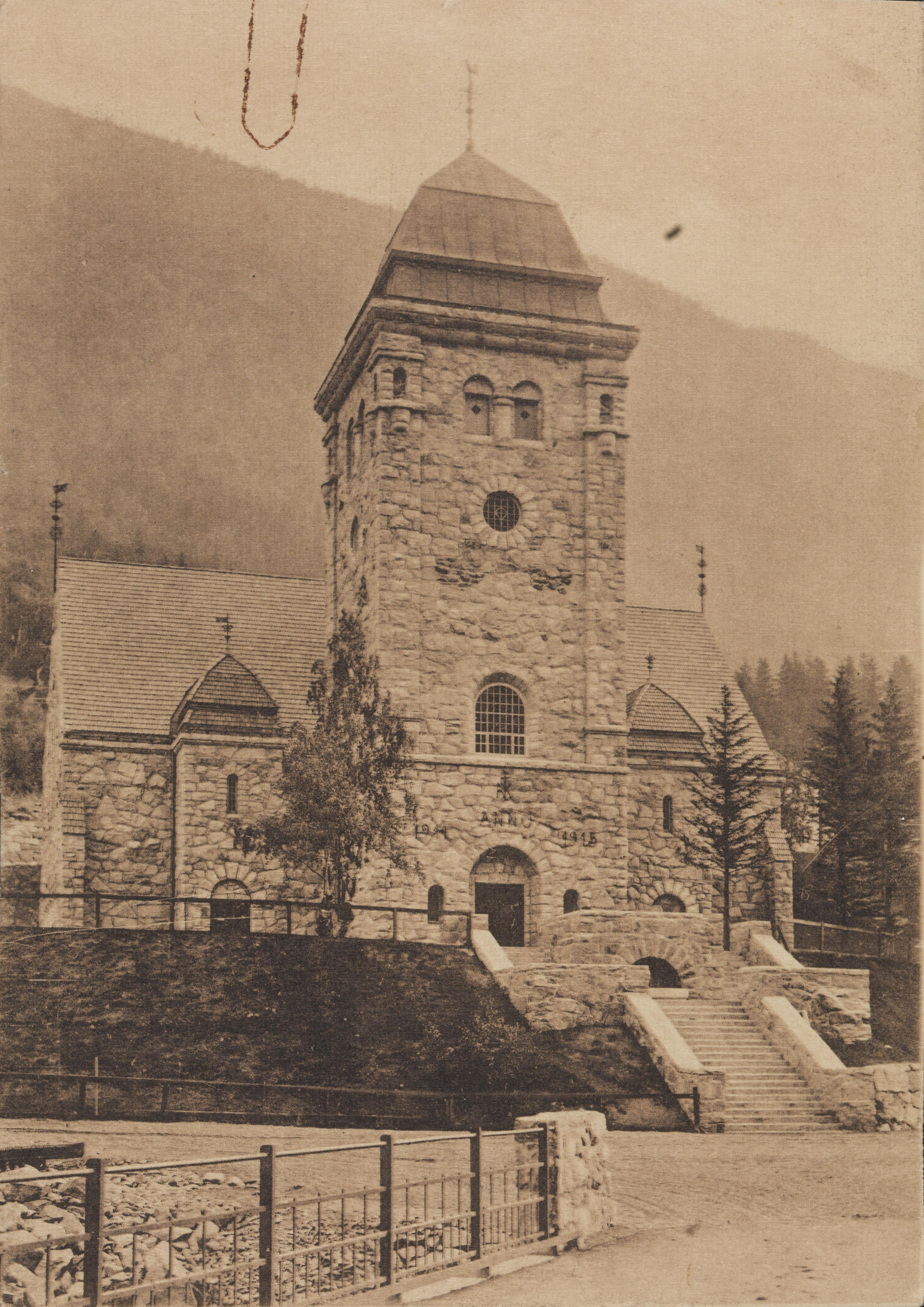

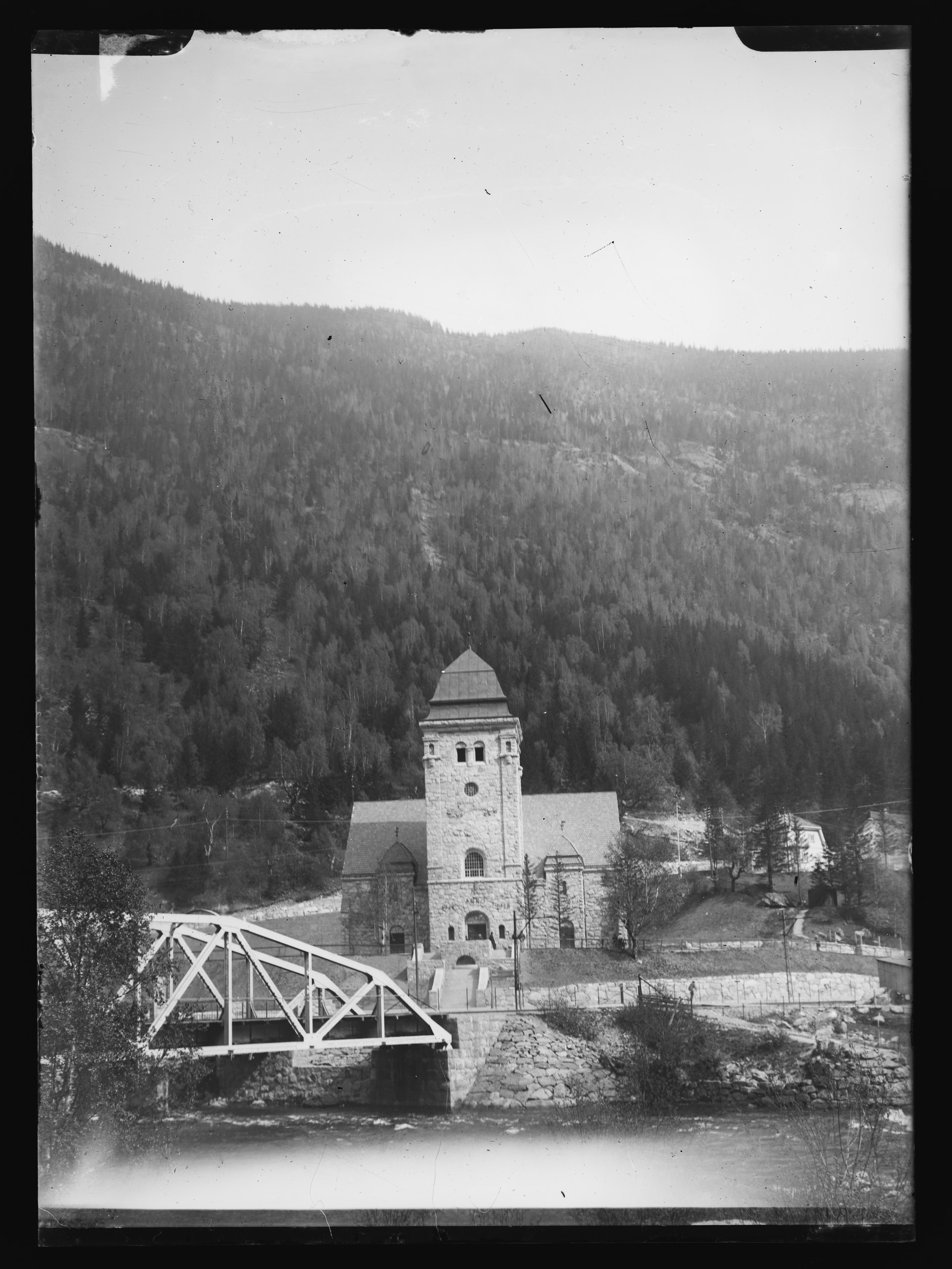

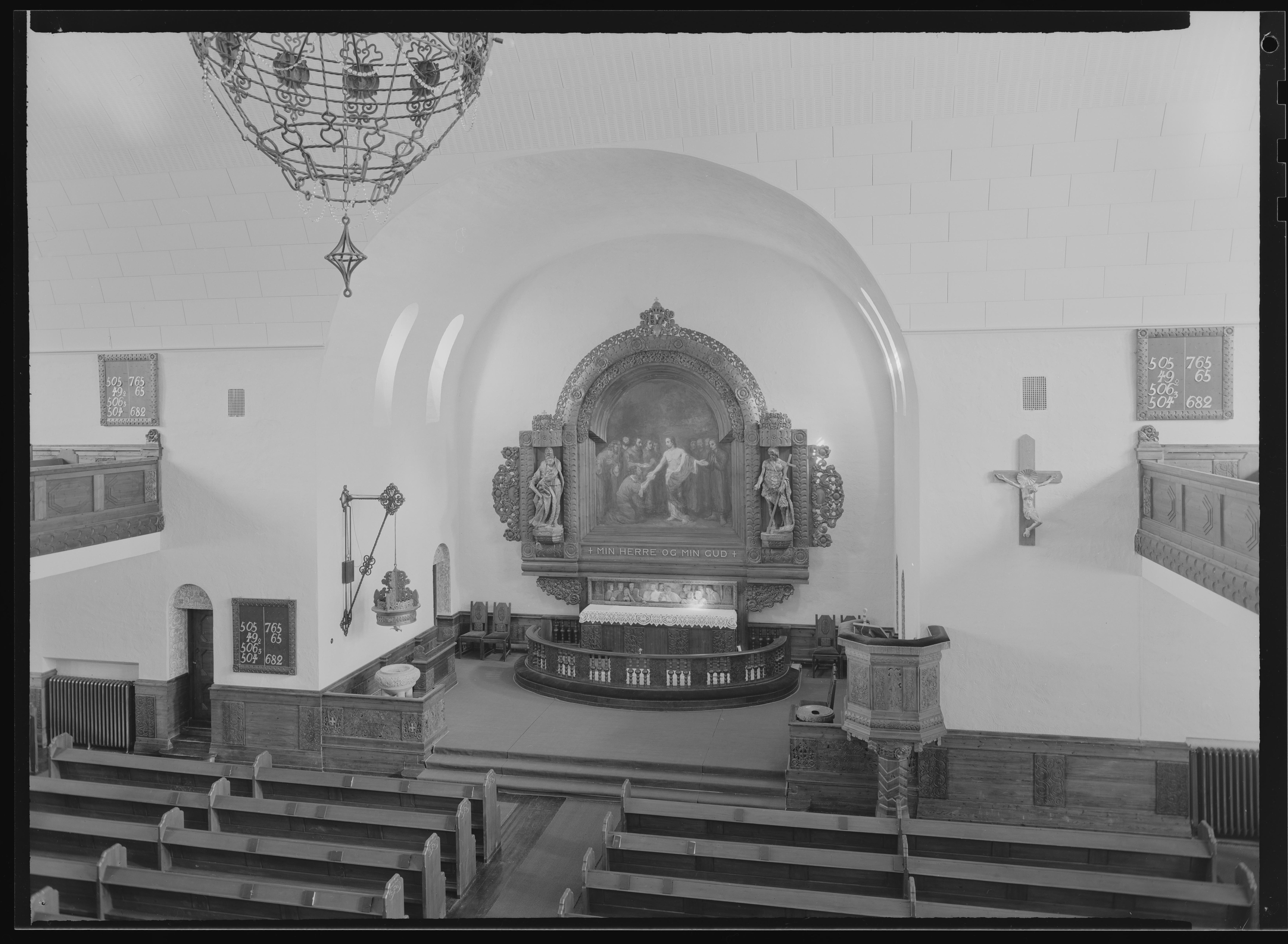
Old interior before 1965.

== See also ==
- List of churches in Agder og Telemark
