= Dal Church =

Church in Telemark, Norway

- Dal kirke
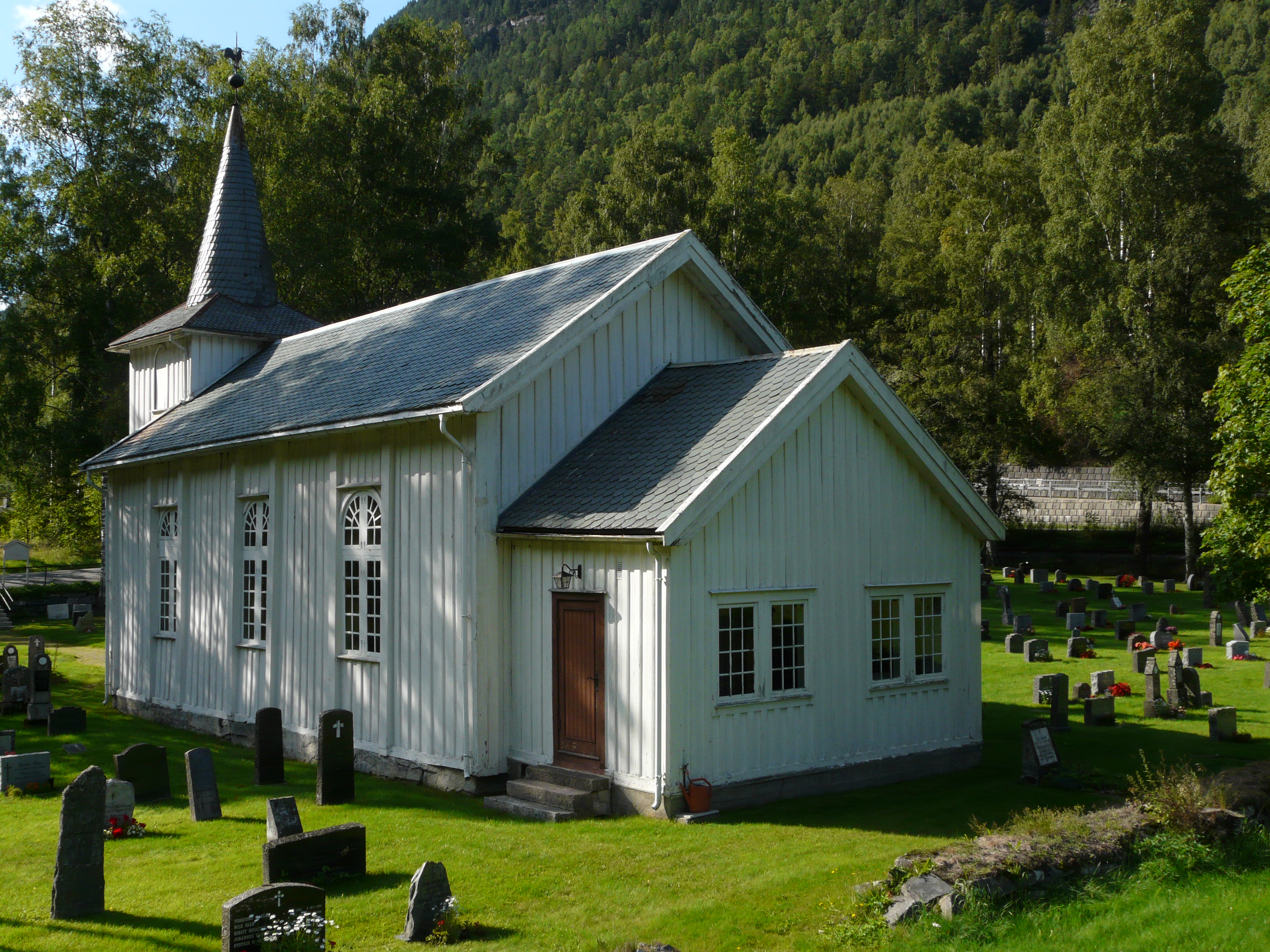
- View of the church
- Dal Church
- 59°52′58″N 8°40′30″E
- Location: Tinn Municipality, Telemark
- Country: Norway
- Denomination: Church of Norway
- Previous denomination: Catholic Church
- Churchmanship: Evangelical Lutheran

History
- Status: Parish church
- Founded: 13th century

Architecture
- Functional status: Active
- Architect: Hans Linstow (1844)
- Architectural type: Rectangular
- Completed: 1775 (251 years ago)

Specifications
- Capacity: 200
- Materials: Wood

Administration
- Diocese: Agder og Telemark
- Deanery: Øvre Telemark prosti
- Parish: Rjukan
- Norwegian Cultural Heritage Site
- Type: Church
- Status: Automatically protected
- ID: 84012

Dal Church (Norwegian: Dal kirke) is a parish church of the Church of Norway in Tinn Municipality in Telemark county, Norway. It is located in the town of Rjukan. It is one of the churches for the Rjukan parish which is part of the Øvre Telemark prosti (deanery) in the Diocese of Agder og Telemark. The white, wooden church was built in a long church design in 1775 using plans drawn up by an unknown architect. It was rebuilt in 1844 to give it a rectangular design using plans by Hans Linstow. The church seats about 200 people.

== History ==
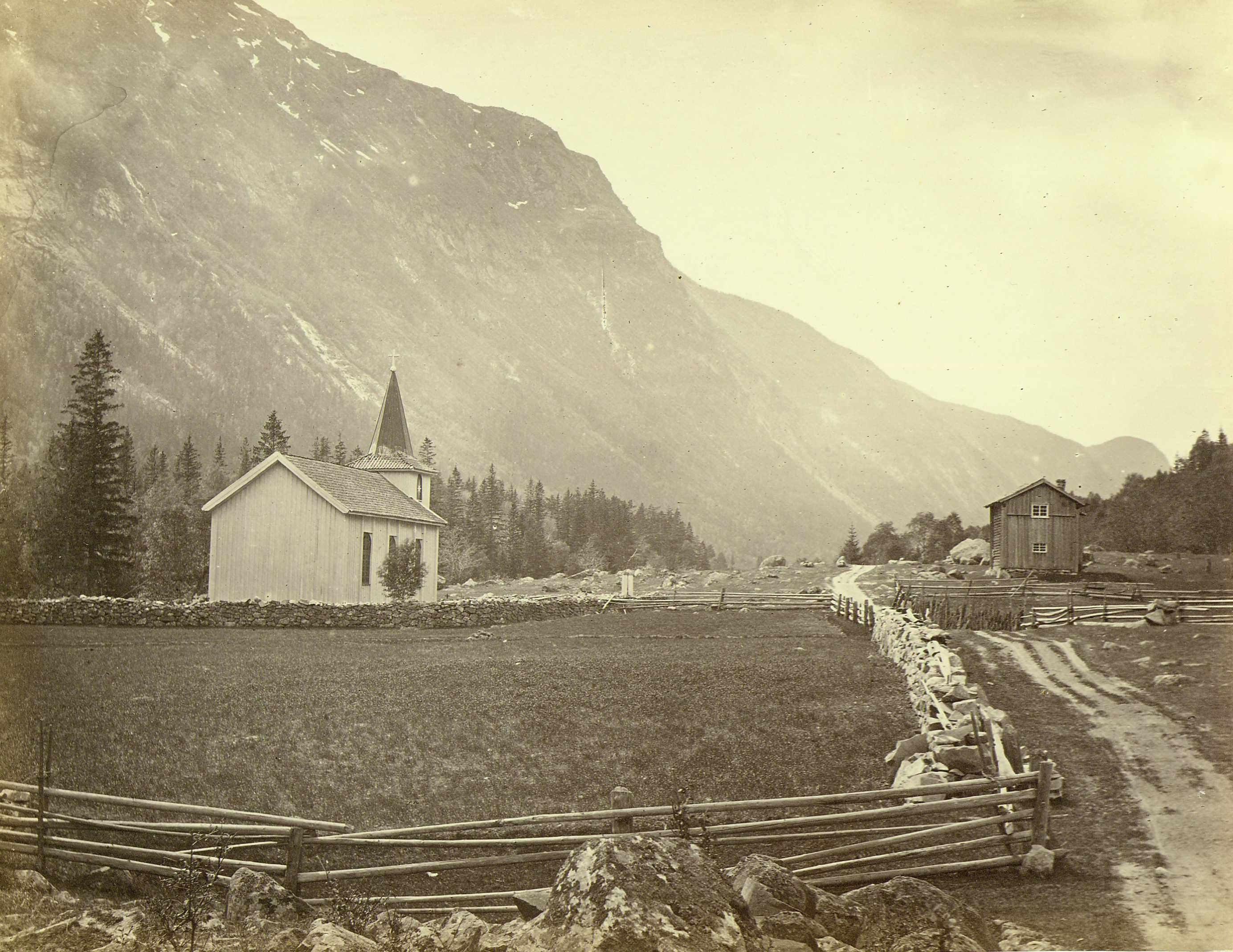
View of the church around 1868

The earliest existing historical records of the church date back to the year 1401, but the church was not built that year. The first church in Dal was a wooden stave church that was possibly built during the 1200s. This stave church probably included some timber from an earlier stave church at Frøystul. During the 18th century, the church was dilapidated and too small for the congregation, so plans were made for its repair or replacement. In 1775 the old nave was torn down, leaving just the small chancel remaining. A new, larger nave was built in place of the old nave. In 1842–1844, the church was renovated and enlarged and it basically got its current form during that project. The old, medieval chancel was removed and the old nave from 1775 was enlarged and lengthened to the east to house both the new chancel and the new nave, giving the church a rectangular design. A new church porch and bell tower was built on the west end. This renovation was probably based on plans by Hans Linstow (who is sometimes cited as the church's architect). In 1916–1917, the church was restored again and a new sacristy was built on the east end in addition to a new floor and roof. From 1960 to 1962, the church was restored to its 1844 appearance. On 8 December 1962, the newly restored church was reopened and re-consecrated by Bishop Kaare Støylen.

== See also ==
- List of churches in Agder og Telemark
