= Vegglifjell =

Mountain area in Buskerud/Telemark, Norway

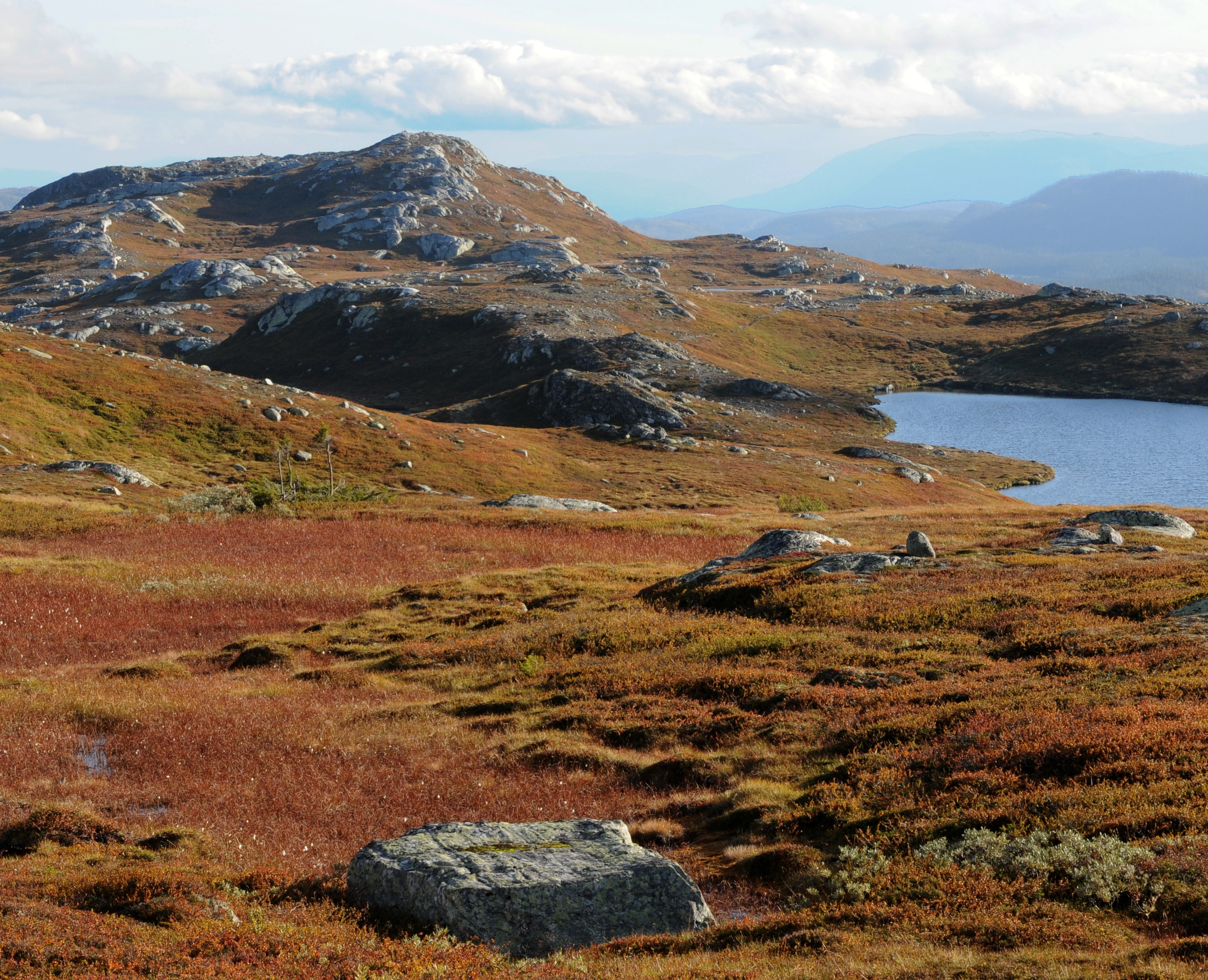
- View of the Vegglifjell area

Highest point
- Peak: Skirveggen, Tinn Municipality, Telemark
- Elevation: 1,380 m (4,530 ft)
- Prominence: 178 m (584 ft)
- Isolation: 30 metres (98 ft)
- Coordinates: 60.10807°N 8.9245°E

Geography
- Location: Eastern Norway
- Range coordinates: 60.02581°N 9.03434°E

Vegglifjell is a mountain range located along the border of Buskerud and Telemark counties in southern Norway. It runs through Tinn Municipality, Rollag Municipality, and Nore og Uvdal Municipality. The highest point is the 1,380-metre (4,530 ft) tall Skirveggin mountain. The mountain range is surrounded by the Numedalen valley to the east side, the Uvdalen valley to the north, and the Tessungdalen valley on the west side.

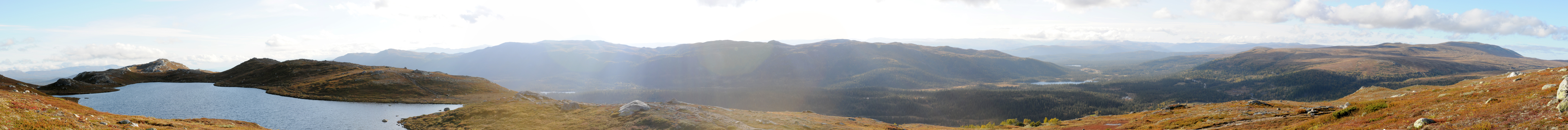
1200px

== See also ==
- List of mountains of Norway by height
