= Atrå Church =

Church in Telemark, Norway

- Atrå kyrkje
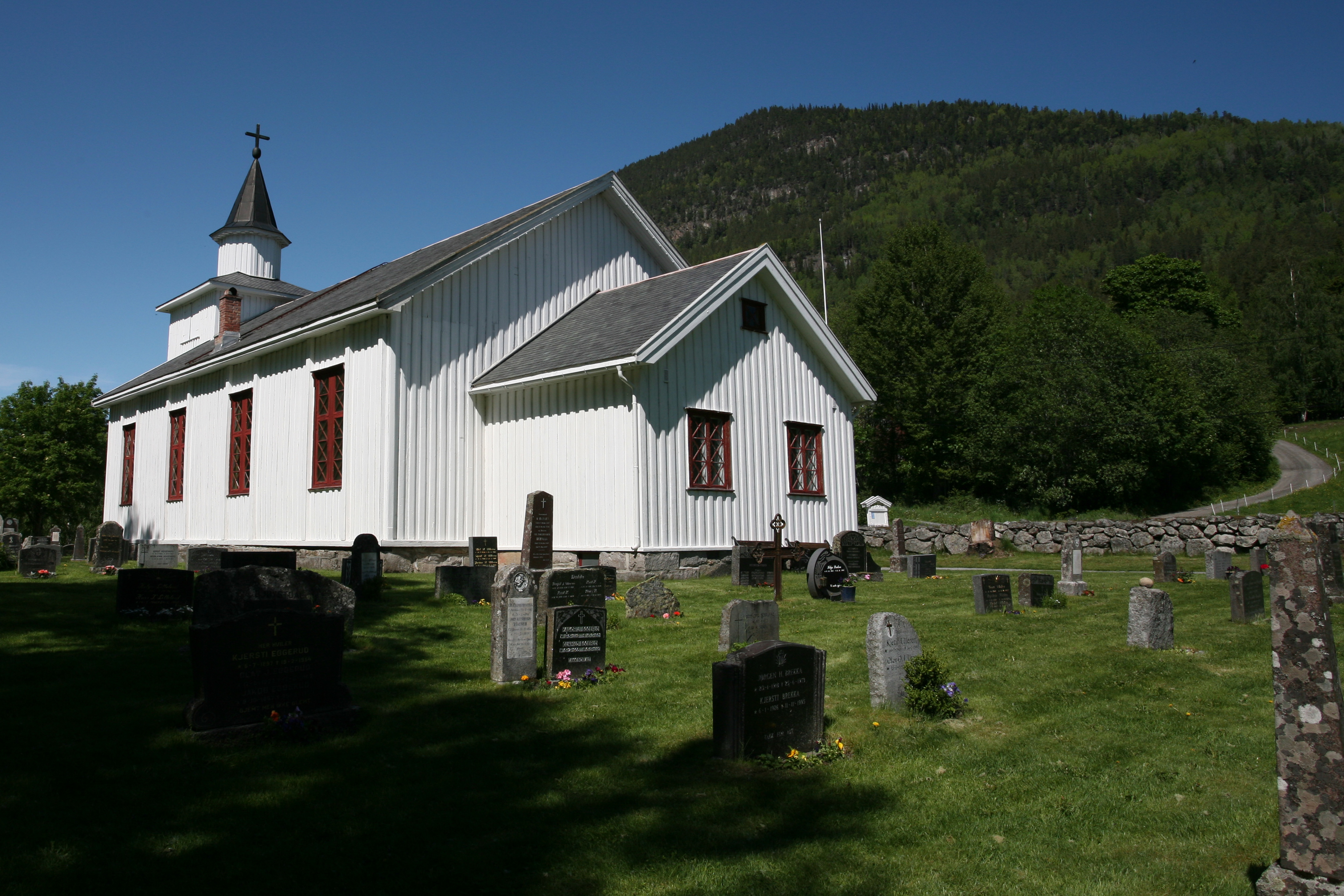
- View of the church
- Atrå Church
- 59°59′18″N 8°43′55″E
- Location: Tinn Municipality, Telemark
- Country: Norway
- Denomination: Church of Norway
- Previous denomination: Catholic Church
- Churchmanship: Evangelical Lutheran

History
- Status: Parish church
- Founded: c. 1180
- Consecrated: 4 September 1836

Architecture
- Functional status: Active
- Architect: Hans Linstow
- Architectural type: Long church
- Style: Empire style
- Completed: 1836 (190 years ago)

Specifications
- Capacity: 300
- Materials: Wood

Administration
- Diocese: Agder og Telemark
- Deanery: Øvre Telemark prosti
- Parish: Tinn
- Norwegian Cultural Heritage Site
- Type: Church
- Status: Automatically protected
- ID: 83807

Atrå Church (Norwegian: Atrå kyrkje) is a parish church of the Church of Norway in Tinn Municipality in Telemark county, Norway. It is located in the village of Atrå. It is one of the churches for the Tinn parish which is part of the Øvre Telemark prosti (deanery) in the Diocese of Agder og Telemark. The white, wooden church was built in a long church design in 1836 using plans drawn up by the architect Hans Linstow. The church seats about 300 people.

== History ==
The first church at Atrå was a wooden stave church that was built during the 12th century. Legend says that the church was consecrated in 1180 by Bishop Ragnar of the Ancient Diocese of Hamar. We know quite a bit about what the church looked like. A drawing that was probably made at the time it was demolished shows some of it, and memories from those who remember the church were also written down. Particularly important was the story of Hellek H. Husevold, who said that there were three doors, to the north, south, and west. The door to the south was quite narrow and you could see the marks of knife sheaths that had scraped against the frame as people walked through it. There were two steps up to get from the nave to the chancel. On one side of the altar was a picture of Adam and Eve, and the altarpiece had a picture of Christ and the disciples. There were two galleries, one for men and one for women. The main door in the west originally went inwards, but in 1823 there was an order that it had to be opened the other way (this was the year before Grue Church had burned down, and more than a hundred people had to die when they could not open the doors leading in). By 1799, records show that the old church was in poor condition and some of the stave poles were rotting which had led to structural shifting and crooked walls.

In 1814, this church served as an election church (Norwegian: valgkirke). Together with more than 300 other parish churches across Norway, it was a polling station for elections to the 1814 Norwegian Constituent Assembly which wrote the Constitution of Norway. This was Norway's first national elections. Each church parish was a constituency that elected people called "electors" who later met together in each county to elect the representatives for the assembly that was to meet at Eidsvoll Manor later that year.

In 1825, the parish requested that the church be torn down and replaced with a wooden cruciform church. This was rejected by the government, but plans by Hans Linstow were sent to the parish in late-1827. These showed a new building in log construction in the design of a long church in the Empire style, but this plan caused some dissatisfaction with the building committee and the parish priest, who believed that it would be too small, and that the windows weakened the structure of the building. In addition, there was a lack of local knowledge about log construction. Furthermore, timber-framing was unknown to locals at the time, so the tower would need to be lowered. They hired the builders Christen Aslachsen Rustan (or Rugstad) and Christen Andersen Stensaas from Skien. The final plans for the new church were approved by royal resolution in July 1828. The old church was torn down and the new church was built on the same site in 1833–1834. The new building was consecrated on 4 September 1836 by the provost Søren Schive.

In 1895, the corridor behind the altar was removed. In 1908, the interior was significantly changed under the direction of Haldor Børve. The side galleries were removed, the ceiling was covered with straw and divided into fields, the gallery parapet got moldings that divided it into fields, the church got new pews, and it got an altarpiece where a cross had previously been used. In 1922–1924, a sacristy was built as an extension of the choir, and the former sacristy south of the choir was converted into an organ house. There was a new round of renovations in 1951–1952, where, among other things, the pulpit was painted with rosemåling by Øystein Orekås, apparently against the wishes of the National Antiquarian.

== Media gallery ==
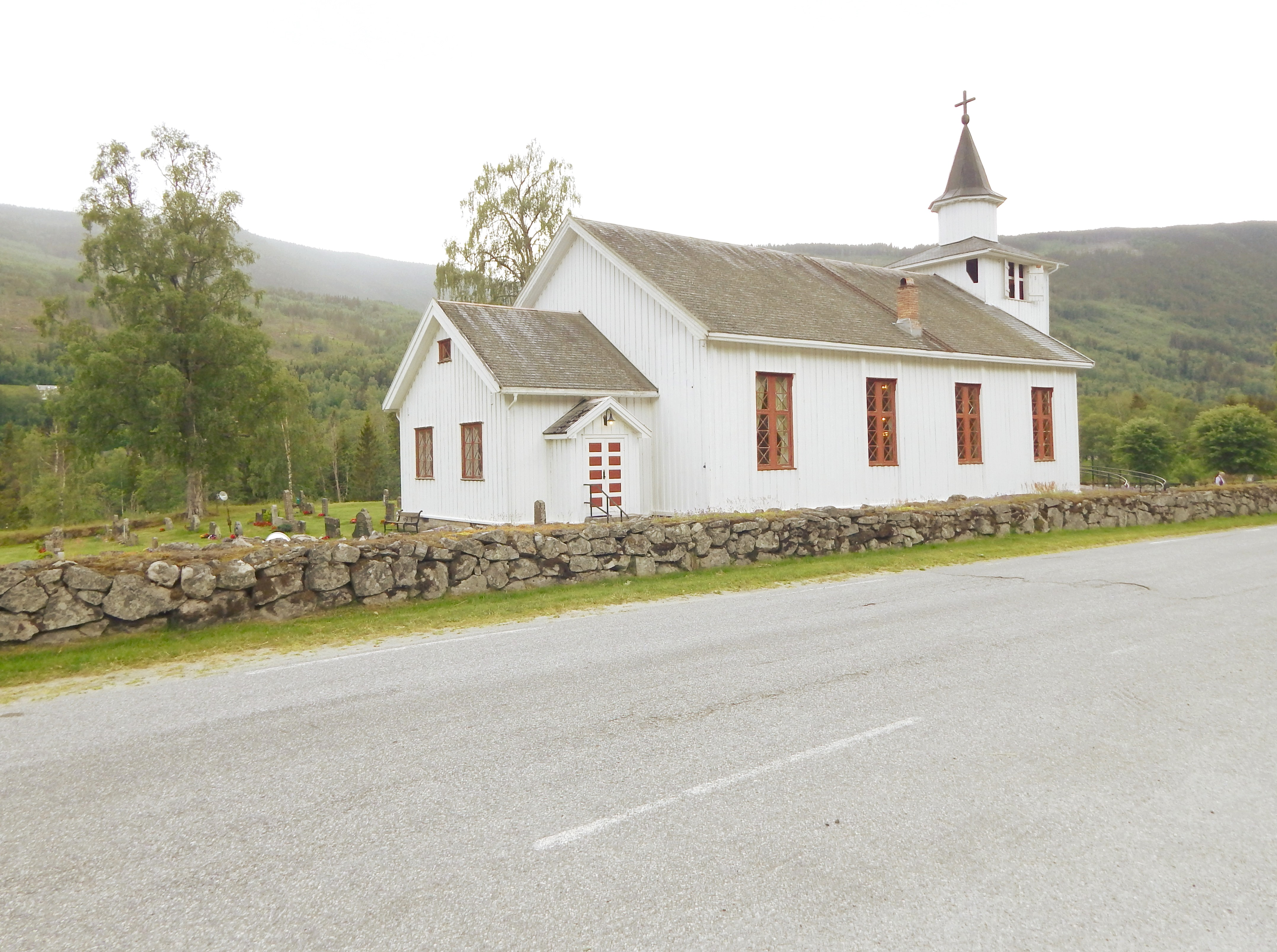
View of the present church

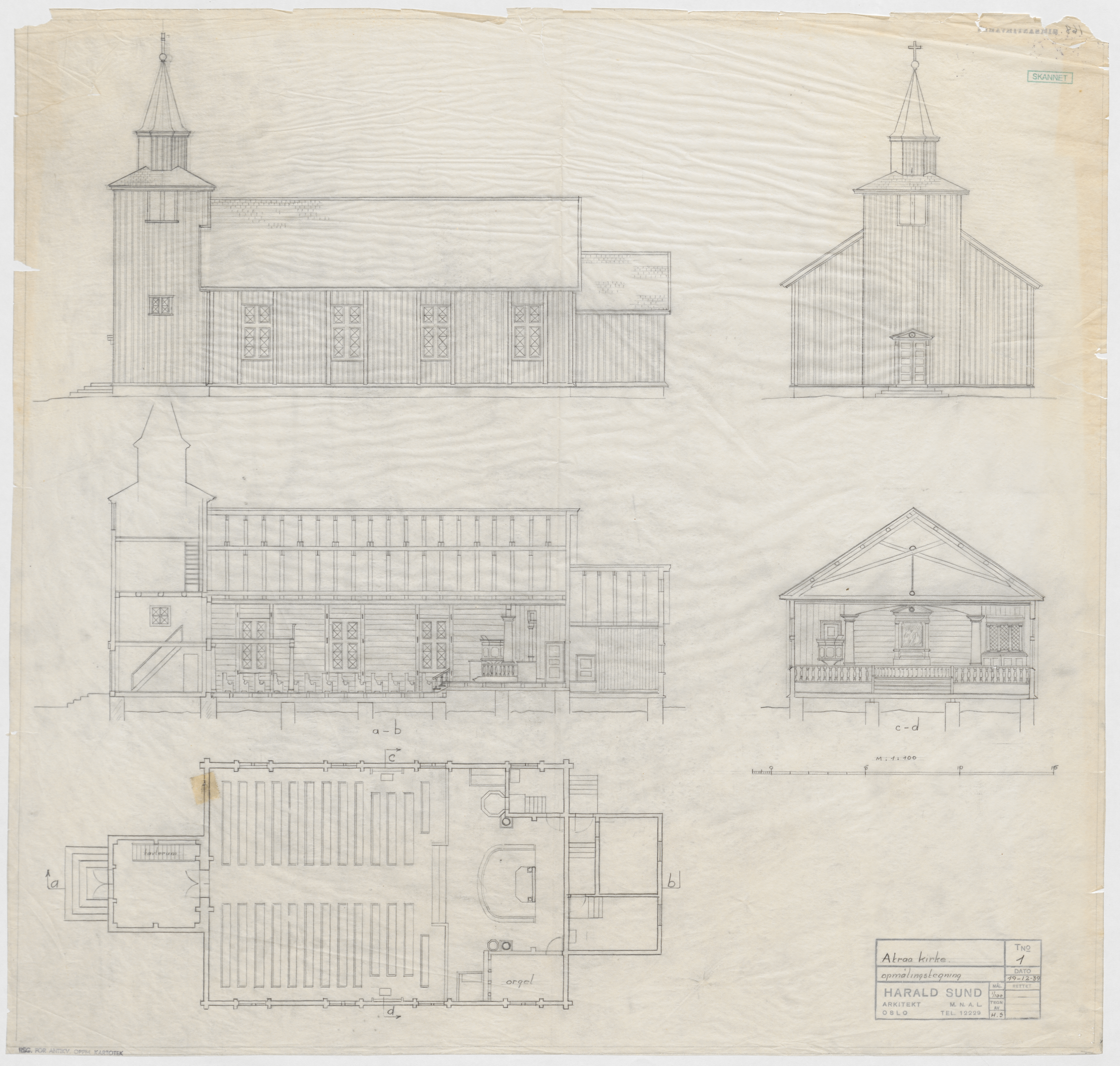
Diagram of the present church

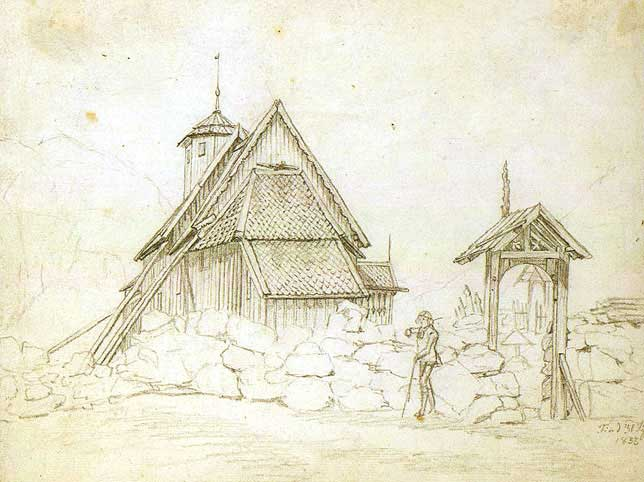
Old Atrå Stave Church

== See also ==
- List of churches in Agder og Telemark
