= Tinn Municipality =

Municipality in Telemark, Norway

Tinn Municipality Tinn kommune
- Municipality
- Tind herred (historic name)
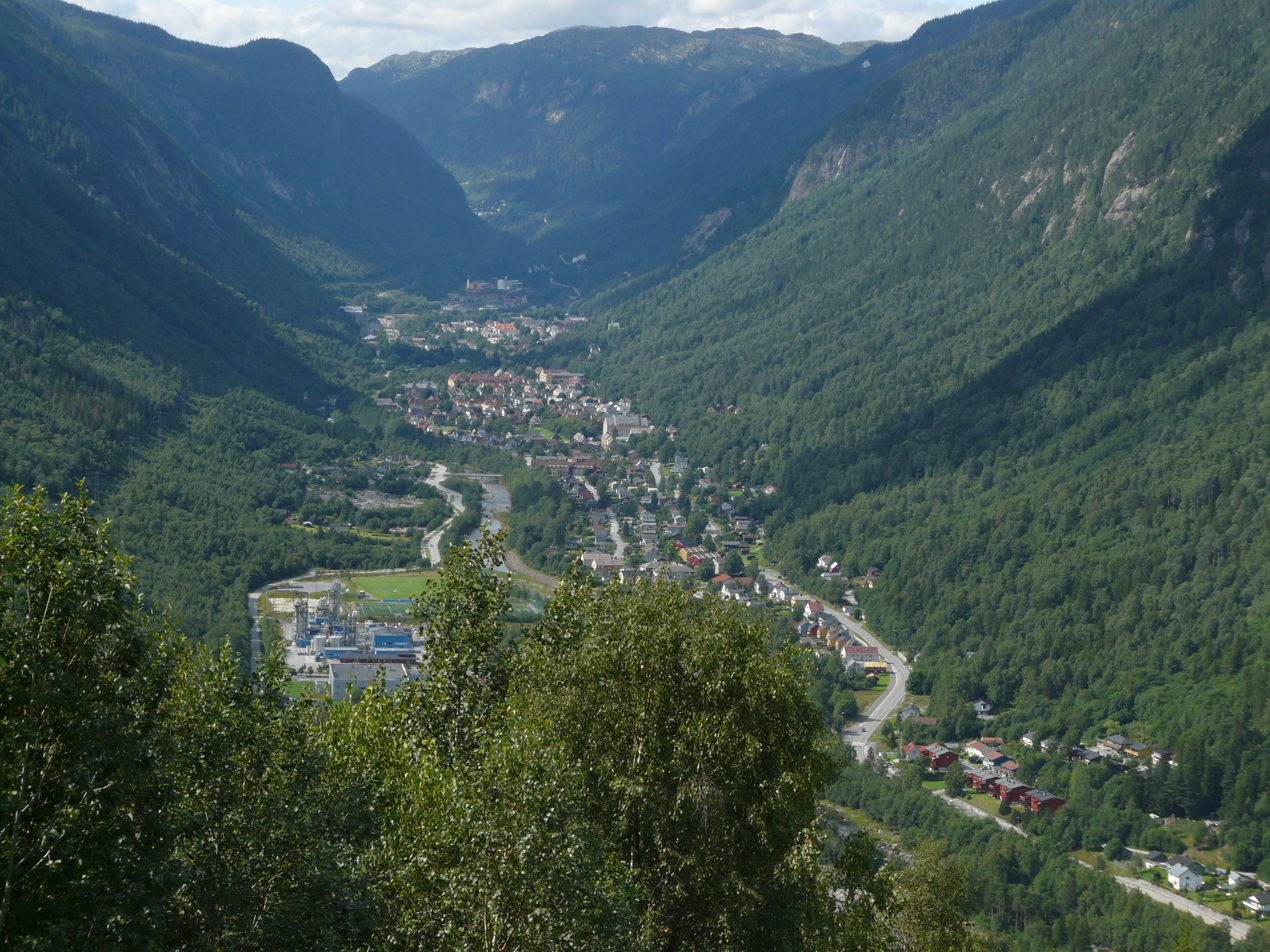
- View of Rjukan

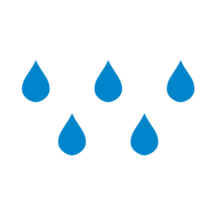
- Flag Coat of arms

- Telemark within Norway

- Tinn within Telemark
- Coordinates: 60°0′33″N 8°33′34″E
- Country: Norway
- County: Telemark
- District: Aust-Telemark
- Established: 1 Jan 1838
  - Created as: Formannskapsdistrikt
- Administrative centre: Rjukan

Government
  - Mayor (2023): Kathrine Haatvedt (Ap)

Area
  - Total: 2,045.13 km^{2} (789.63 sq mi)
  - Land: 1,848.01 km^{2} (713.52 sq mi)
  - Water: 197.12 km^{2} (76.11 sq mi) 9.6%
  - Rank: #34 in Norway
- Highest elevation: 1,882.12 m (6,174.9 ft)

Population (2026)
  - Total: 5,515
  - Rank: #174 in Norway
  - Density: 3/km^{2} (7.8/sq mi)
  - Change (10 years): ▼ −7.2%
- Demonym: Tinndøl

Official language
  - Norwegian form: Neutral
- Time zone: UTC+01:00 (CET)
  - Summer (DST): UTC+02:00 (CEST)
- ISO 3166 code: NO-4026
- Website: Official website

Tinn (Norwegian pronunciation: [tɪn]; locally [tɪɳː]) is a municipality in Telemark county, Norway. It is located in the traditional districts of Aust-Telemark which lies within the larger Upper Telemark region. The administrative centre of the municipality is the town of Rjukan. Some of the villages in Tinn include Atrå, Austbygde, Hovin, and Miland.

The 2,045.13-square-kilometre (789.63 sq mi) municipality is the 34th largest by area out of the 357 municipalities in Norway. Tinn Municipality is the 174th most populous municipality in Norway with a population of 5,515. The municipality's population density is 3 inhabitants per square kilometre (7.8/sq mi) and its population has decreased by 7.2% over the previous 10-year period.

The Krossobanen is the oldest aerial tramway in Northern Europe. It was built in 1928 as a gift from Norsk Hydro. The Hardangervidda National Park center is located at Skinnarbu on the southeastern shore of the lake Møsvatn in the far western part of the municipality.

== General information ==
=== Administrative history ===
The formannskapsdistrikt law of 1837 created a system of local government in Norway by establishing each town (ladested or kjøpstad) and each Church of Norway prestegjeld as a civil municipality. On 1 January 1838, Tinn prestegjeld was established as Tind Municipality (later spelled Tinn). In 1860, the southeastern area of the municipality around the village of Hovin (population: 815) was separated from Tinn Municipaltiy to become part of the newly created Gransherad Municipality. On 24 March 1903, an unpopulated area of Tinn Municipality was transferred to the neighboring Hovin Municipality.

During the 1960s, there were many municipal mergers across Norway due to the work of the Schei Committee. On 1 January 1964, Tinn Municipality was enlarged when the areas of Hovin Municipality that were located east of the lake Tinnsjå (population: 461) were merged into Tinn Municipality. (The rest of the old Hovin Municipality became part of the neighboring Notodden Municipality).

In 2020, there were many municipal and county mergers across Norway due to the work of the Solberg cabinet. Historically, this municipality was part of Telemark county. On 1 January 2020, the municipality became a part of the newly-formed Vestfold og Telemark county (after Telemark and Vestfold counties were merged). The merger was shortlived, and on 1 January 2024, the merger was undone and this municipality became part of Telemark county once again.

=== Name ===
The municipality is named after the old Tinn prestegjeld. The prestegjeld was named after an either old name for the area (Old Norse: Tinnr) or an old name for the local lake Tinnsjå. The name is possibly derived from the word tjǫrn which means "small lake" or "pond". Historically, the name was spelled Tind.

=== Coat of arms ===
The coat of arms was granted on 25 November 1994. The official blazon is "Argent, five gouttes de larmes, three and two" (Norwegian: I sølv fem blå dråper, 3-2). This means the arms have a field (background) has a tincture of argent which means it is commonly colored white, but if it is made out of metal, then silver is used. The charge is a set of five gouttes (droplets) of water. This design was chosen to represent the five rivers in the municipality and the hydropower plants near Rjukan. The arms were designed by Halvor Holtskog. The municipal flag has the same design as the coat of arms.

=== Churches ===
The Church of Norway has two parishes (sokn) within Tinn Municipality. It is part of the Øvre Telemark prosti (deanery) in the Diocese of Agder og Telemark.

Churches in Tinn Municipality
Parish (sokn)	Church name	Location of the church	Year built
Rjukan	Dal Church	Rjukan	1775
Rjukan	Rjukan Church	Rjukan	1915
Tinn	Atrå Church	Atrå	1836
Tinn	Austbygde Church	Austbygde	1888
Tinn	Hovin Church	Hovin	1850
Tinn	Mæl Church	Miland	1839

== History ==
The Rjukan Falls, located on the Måna river, allowed construction of Vemork, the largest power station in the world in 1911. The station has become a museum where one can explore the history of the energy and see exhibits about the industrial development in Norway and in the town of Rjukan.

The museum at Vemork is most famous for its presentation of Rjukan's war history. During World War II, Vemork was the site of the Norwegian heavy water sabotage, when Norwegian saboteurs prevented the Germans from producing nuclear weapons from the heavy water which was produced here. The exhibit Atomkappløpet ("The nuclear race") presents the four heavy water sabotages and the allied efforts to develop a nuclear bomb.

== Government ==
Tinn Municipality is responsible for primary education (through 10th grade), outpatient health services, senior citizen services, welfare and other social services, zoning, economic development, and municipal roads and utilities. The municipality is governed by a municipal council of directly elected representatives. The mayor is indirectly elected by a vote of the municipal council. The municipality is under the jurisdiction of the Øvre Telemark District Court and the Agder Court of Appeal.

=== Municipal council ===
The municipal council (Kommunestyre) of Tinn Municipality is made up of 25 representatives that are elected to four-year terms. The tables below show the current and historical composition of the council by political party.

Tinn kommunestyre 2023–2027
Party name (in Norwegian)	Number of representatives
Labour Party (Arbeiderpartiet)	8
Progress Party (Fremskrittspartiet)	2
Conservative Party (Høyre)	6
Centre Party (Senterpartiet)	4
Socialist Left Party (Sosialistisk Venstreparti)	4
Liberal Party (Venstre)	1
Total number of members:	25

Tinn kommunestyre 2019–2023
Party name (in Norwegian)	Number of representatives
Labour Party (Arbeiderpartiet)	6
Progress Party (Fremskrittspartiet)	1
Conservative Party (Høyre)	6
Centre Party (Senterpartiet)	7
Socialist Left Party (Sosialistisk Venstreparti)	5
Total number of members:	25

Tinn kommunestyre 2015–2019
Party name (in Norwegian)	Number of representatives
Labour Party (Arbeiderpartiet)	5
Green Party (Miljøpartiet De Grønne)	1
Conservative Party (Høyre)	6
Centre Party (Senterpartiet)	11
Socialist Left Party (Sosialistisk Venstreparti)	2
Total number of members:	25

Tinn kommunestyre 2011–2015
Party name (in Norwegian)	Number of representatives
Labour Party (Arbeiderpartiet)	11
Progress Party (Fremskrittspartiet)	2
Conservative Party (Høyre)	8
Christian Democratic Party (Kristelig Folkeparti)	1
Centre Party (Senterpartiet)	3
Socialist Left Party (Sosialistisk Venstreparti)	2
Liberal Party (Venstre)	2
Total number of members:	29

Tinn kommunestyre 2007–2011
Party name (in Norwegian)	Number of representatives
Labour Party (Arbeiderpartiet)	14
Progress Party (Fremskrittspartiet)	3
Conservative Party (Høyre)	4
Christian Democratic Party (Kristelig Folkeparti)	1
Centre Party (Senterpartiet)	2
Socialist Left Party (Sosialistisk Venstreparti)	2
Total number of members:	29

Tinn kommunestyre 2003–2007
Party name (in Norwegian)	Number of representatives
Labour Party (Arbeiderpartiet)	13
Progress Party (Fremskrittspartiet)	4
Conservative Party (Høyre)	6
Christian Democratic Party (Kristelig Folkeparti)	1
Centre Party (Senterpartiet)	2
Socialist Left Party (Sosialistisk Venstreparti)	3
Total number of members:	29

Tinn kommunestyre 1999–2003
Party name (in Norwegian)	Number of representatives
Labour Party (Arbeiderpartiet)	9
Progress Party (Fremskrittspartiet)	3
Conservative Party (Høyre)	8
Christian Democratic Party (Kristelig Folkeparti)	1
Centre Party (Senterpartiet)	5
Socialist Left Party (Sosialistisk Venstreparti)	3
Total number of members:	29

Tinn kommunestyre 1995–1999
Party name (in Norwegian)	Number of representatives
Labour Party (Arbeiderpartiet)	13
Conservative Party (Høyre)	4
Christian Democratic Party (Kristelig Folkeparti)	1
Centre Party (Senterpartiet)	17
Socialist Left Party (Sosialistisk Venstreparti)	2
Total number of members:	37

Tinn kommunestyre 1991–1995
Party name (in Norwegian)	Number of representatives
Labour Party (Arbeiderpartiet)	13
Conservative Party (Høyre)	2
Christian Democratic Party (Kristelig Folkeparti)	1
Centre Party (Senterpartiet)	8
Socialist Left Party (Sosialistisk Venstreparti)	5
Cross-party list (Tverrpolitisk liste)	8
Total number of members:	37

Tinn kommunestyre 1987–1991
Party name (in Norwegian)	Number of representatives
Labour Party (Arbeiderpartiet)	14
Conservative Party (Høyre)	5
Christian Democratic Party (Kristelig Folkeparti)	1
Centre Party (Senterpartiet)	3
Socialist Left Party (Sosialistisk Venstreparti)	3
Liberal Party (Venstre)	1
Cross-party list (Tverrpolitisk liste)	10
Total number of members:	37

Tinn kommunestyre 1983–1987
Party name (in Norwegian)	Number of representatives
Labour Party (Arbeiderpartiet)	21
Conservative Party (Høyre)	8
Christian Democratic Party (Kristelig Folkeparti)	1
Centre Party (Senterpartiet)	3
Socialist Left Party (Sosialistisk Venstreparti)	3
Liberal Party (Venstre)	1
Total number of members:	37

Tinn kommunestyre 1979–1983
Party name (in Norwegian)	Number of representatives
Labour Party (Arbeiderpartiet)	24
Conservative Party (Høyre)	10
Christian Democratic Party (Kristelig Folkeparti)	2
Centre Party (Senterpartiet)	4
Socialist Left Party (Sosialistisk Venstreparti)	3
Liberal Party (Venstre)	2
Total number of members:	45

Tinn kommunestyre 1975–1979
Party name (in Norwegian)	Number of representatives
Labour Party (Arbeiderpartiet)	25
Conservative Party (Høyre)	6
Christian Democratic Party (Kristelig Folkeparti)	3
Centre Party (Senterpartiet)	5
Socialist Left Party (Sosialistisk Venstreparti)	4
Liberal Party (Venstre)	2
Total number of members:	45

Tinn kommunestyre 1971–1975
Party name (in Norwegian)	Number of representatives
Labour Party (Arbeiderpartiet)	27
Conservative Party (Høyre)	5
Christian Democratic Party (Kristelig Folkeparti)	2
Centre Party (Senterpartiet)	5
Socialist People's Party (Sosialistisk Folkeparti)	3
Liberal Party (Venstre)	3
Total number of members:	45

Tinn kommunestyre 1967–1971
Party name (in Norwegian)	Number of representatives
Labour Party (Arbeiderpartiet)	26
Conservative Party (Høyre)	7
Christian Democratic Party (Kristelig Folkeparti)	2
Centre Party (Senterpartiet)	4
Socialist People's Party (Sosialistisk Folkeparti)	3
Liberal Party (Venstre)	3
Total number of members:	45

Tinn kommunestyre 1963–1967
Party name (in Norwegian)	Number of representatives
Labour Party (Arbeiderpartiet)	26
Conservative Party (Høyre)	7
Communist Party (Kommunistiske Parti)	1
Christian Democratic Party (Kristelig Folkeparti)	2
Centre Party (Senterpartiet)	3
Socialist People's Party (Sosialistisk Folkeparti)	3
Liberal Party (Venstre)	3
Total number of members:	45

Tinn herredsstyre 1959–1963
Party name (in Norwegian)	Number of representatives
Labour Party (Arbeiderpartiet)	27
Conservative Party (Høyre)	6
Communist Party (Kommunistiske Parti)	3
Christian Democratic Party (Kristelig Folkeparti)	2
Centre Party (Senterpartiet)	3
Liberal Party (Venstre)	4
Total number of members:	45

Tinn herredsstyre 1955–1959
Party name (in Norwegian)	Number of representatives
Labour Party (Arbeiderpartiet)	25
Conservative Party (Høyre)	6
Communist Party (Kommunistiske Parti)	4
Christian Democratic Party (Kristelig Folkeparti)	3
Farmers' Party (Bondepartiet)	3
Liberal Party (Venstre)	4
Total number of members:	45

Tinn herredsstyre 1951–1955
Party name (in Norwegian)	Number of representatives
Labour Party (Arbeiderpartiet)	25
Conservative Party (Høyre)	5
Communist Party (Kommunistiske Parti)	4
Christian Democratic Party (Kristelig Folkeparti)	3
Farmers' Party (Bondepartiet)	2
Liberal Party (Venstre)	5
Total number of members:	44

Tinn herredsstyre 1947–1951
Party name (in Norwegian)	Number of representatives
Labour Party (Arbeiderpartiet)	21
Conservative Party (Høyre)	3
Communist Party (Kommunistiske Parti)	6
Christian Democratic Party (Kristelig Folkeparti)	2
Farmers' Party (Bondepartiet)	4
Liberal Party (Venstre)	6
Joint List(s) of Non-Socialist Parties (Borgerlige Felleslister)	2
Total number of members:	44

Tinn herredsstyre 1945–1947
Party name (in Norwegian)	Number of representatives
Local List(s) (Lokale lister)	44
Total number of members:	44

Tinn herredsstyre 1937–1940*
Party name (in Norwegian)	Number of representatives
Labour Party (Arbeiderpartiet)	22
Farmers' Party (Bondepartiet)	1
Liberal Party (Venstre)	4
Joint list of the Conservative Party (Høyre) and the Free-minded People's Party (Frisinnede Folkeparti)	4
Joint List(s) of Non-Socialist Parties (Borgerlige Felleslister)	12
Local List(s) (Lokale lister)	1
Total number of members:	44
Note: Due to the German occupation of Norway during World War II, no elections were held for new municipal councils until after the war ended in 1945.

=== Mayors ===
The mayor (Norwegian: ordfører) of Tinn Municipality is the political leader of the municipality and the chairperson of the municipal council. The following people have held this position:

- 1838–1839: Ole Nilsen Besager
- 1840–1841: Halvor Torgersen Rollag
- 1842–1843: Gjermund S. Graver
- 1844–1845: Søren Schive
- 1846–1849: Tore Hemsen
- 1850–1853: Gjermund S. Graver
- 1854–1861: Ole Knudsen
- 1862–1863: Ole Gjermundsen Bakke
- 1864–1881: Ole Knudsen
- 1882–1883: Ole Gjermundsen Bakke
- 1884–1885: Hølje H. Klonteig
- 1886–1895: Ole Knudsen
- 1896–1899: Ola O. Haugan
- 1899–1900: Kristen O. Bøen
- 1901–1916: Knut H. Klonteig
- 1917–1919: Ole O. Bakke
- 1920–1937: Johan O. Bryn (V)
- 1938–1940: Kristen Vaalund (Bp)
- 1941–1941: Hans Ljøstad (NS)
- 1942–1945: Olav Bjørnsen (NS)
- 1945–1945: L.P. Petersen
- 1946–1946: Kristen Vaalund (Bp)
- 1946–1959: Isak Bergan (Ap)
- 1960–1967: Sigurd Kolltveit (Ap)
- 1968–1973: Reidar Engell Olsen (Ap)
- 1974–1987: Einar Haatvedt (Ap)
- 1987–1993: Øystein Dahle (LL)
- 1993–1999: Olav Ulleren (Sp)
- 1999–2003: Berit Stormoen (H)
- 2004–2010: Erik Haatvedt (Ap)
- 2010–2011: Turid Opedal (Ap)
- 2011–2015: Steinar Bergsland (H)
- 2015–2019: Bjørn Sverre Birkeland (Sp)
- 2019–2023: Steinar Bergsland (H)
- 2023–present: Kathrine Haatvedt (Ap)

== Geography ==
Rjukan–Notodden Industrial Heritage Site
UNESCO World Heritage Site
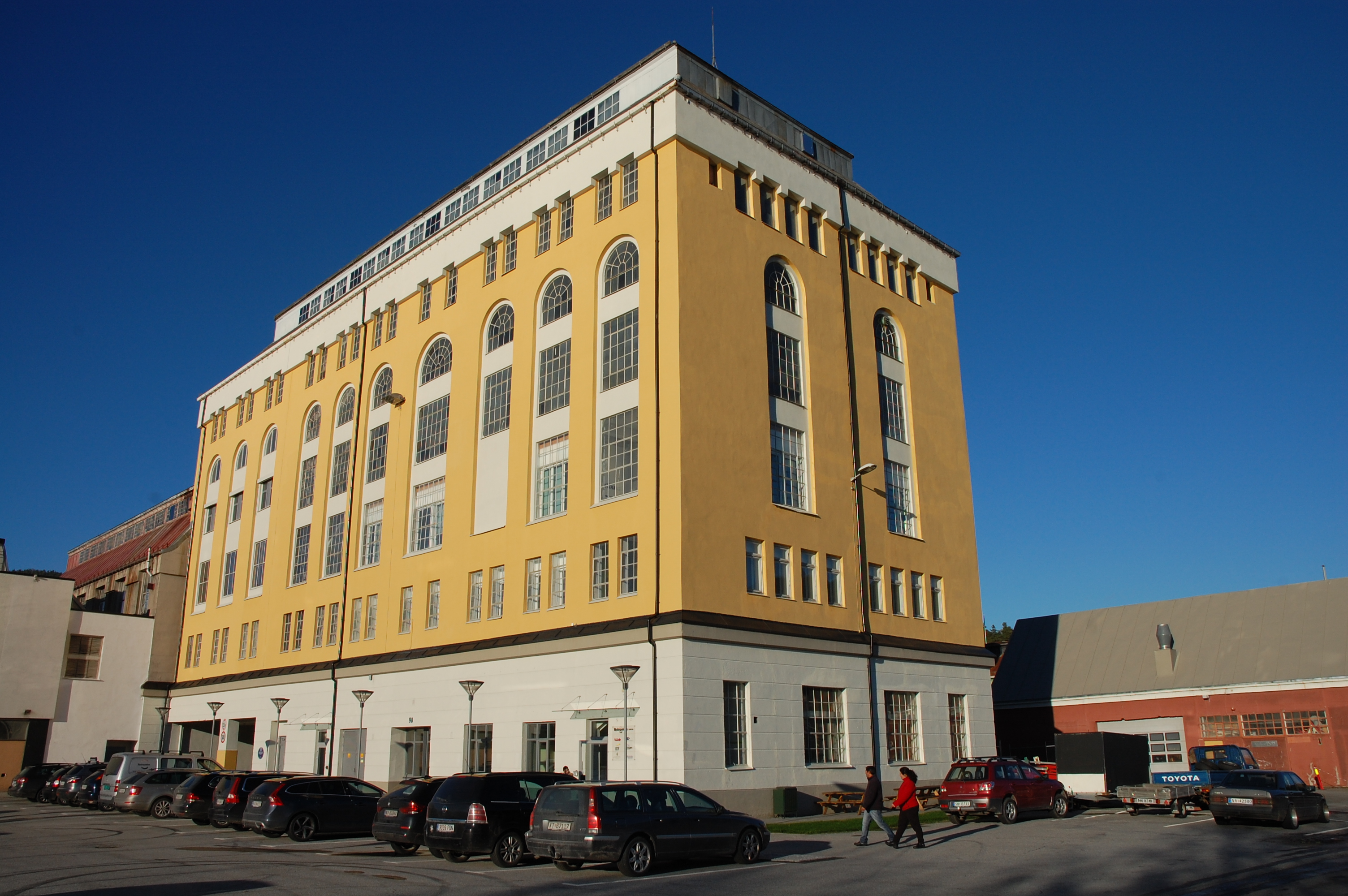
- The old ammonia factory at Notodden industrial site
- Interactive map of Rjukan–Notodden Industrial Heritage Site
- Criteria: Cultural: ii, iv
- Reference: 1486
- Inscription: 2015 (39th Session)
- Area: 4,959.5 ha (12,255 acres)
- Buffer zone: 33,967.6 ha (83,936 acres)

Most of Tinn Municipality is quite rural. The town of Rjukan is the largest settlement. It is located in the Vestfjorddalen valley, through which the Måna river flows. There are several large lakes in Tinn, including Tinnsjå and Kalhovdfjorden.

Tinn stretches deeply into the Hardangervidda plateau. The highest point in the municipality is the 1,882.12-metre (6,174.9 ft) tall mountain Gaustatoppen, which is climbed by 30,000 people each year. On clear days it is possible to see one-sixth of Norway from its summit. Other areas include the Blefjell mountains, with Bletoppen being the highest mountain in that area and also the Vegglifjell mountains, with Skirveggen being the highest mountain in that area.

Nore og Uvdal Municipality (in Buskerud county) is located to the north; Rollag Municipality (also in Buskerud) is located to the east, Flesberg Municipality (in Buskerud) is located to the eastsoutheast; Notodden Municipality is located to the southeast, Hjartdal Municipality is located to the south, Seljord Municipality to the southwest, and Vinje Municipality is located to the west.

== Notable people ==
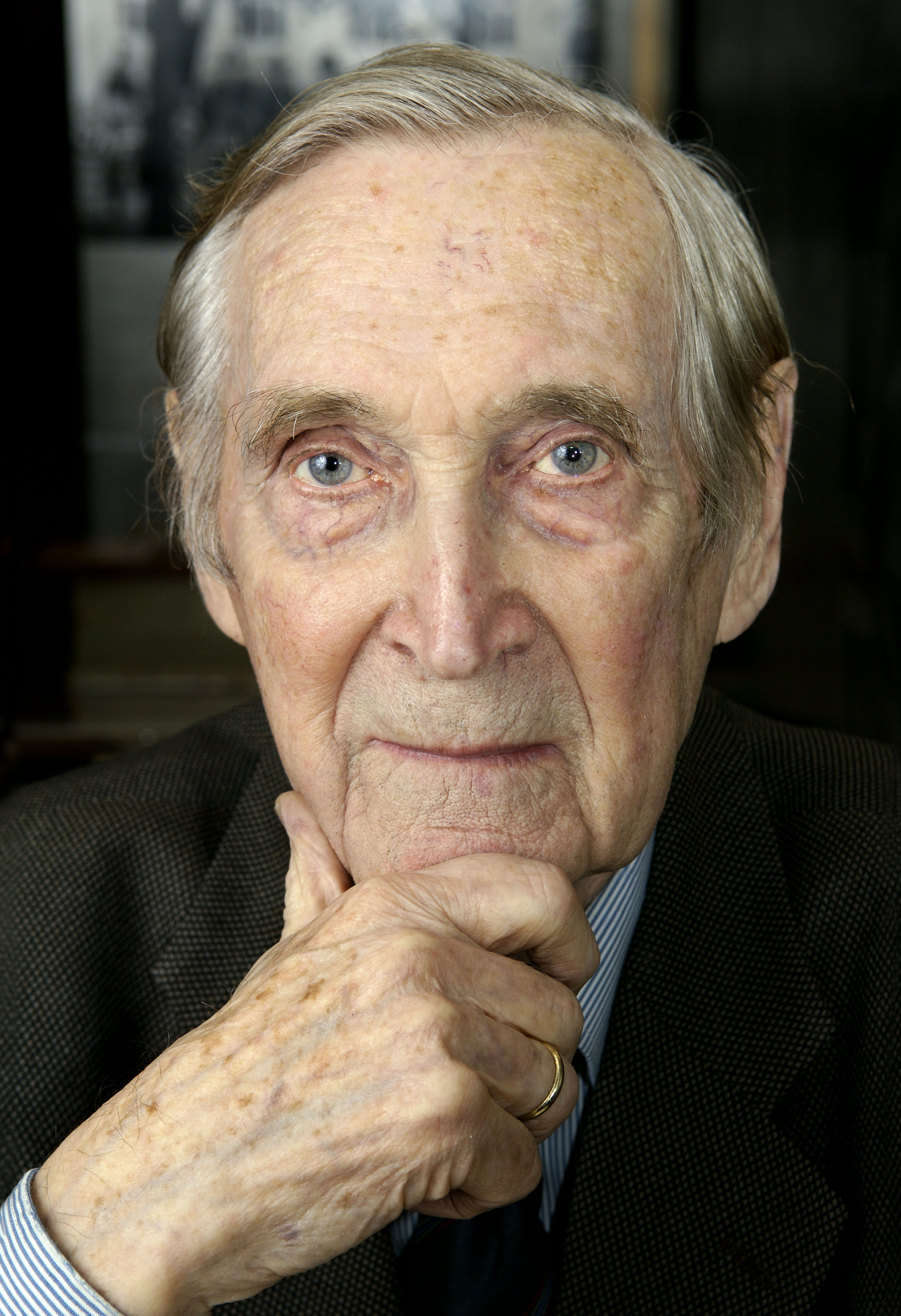
Gunnar Sønsteby, 2008

=== WWII heavy water saboteurs ===
- Arne Kjelstrup MM (1913 in Rjukan – 1995), a Norwegian resistance member during WWII who participated in the Norwegian heavy water sabotage in 1942–1943
- Knut Lier-Hansen (1916 in Rjukan – 2008), a Norwegian resistance member during WWII and Army sergeant who participated in the sinking of SF Hydro as a part of the Norwegian heavy water sabotage
- Jens-Anton Poulsson (1918 in Tinn – 2010), a military officer and Norwegian resistance member who participated in the Norwegian heavy water sabotage in 1942–1943
- Claus Helberg (1919 in Rjukan – 2003), a Norwegian resistance member and mountain guide who participated in the Norwegian heavy water sabotage

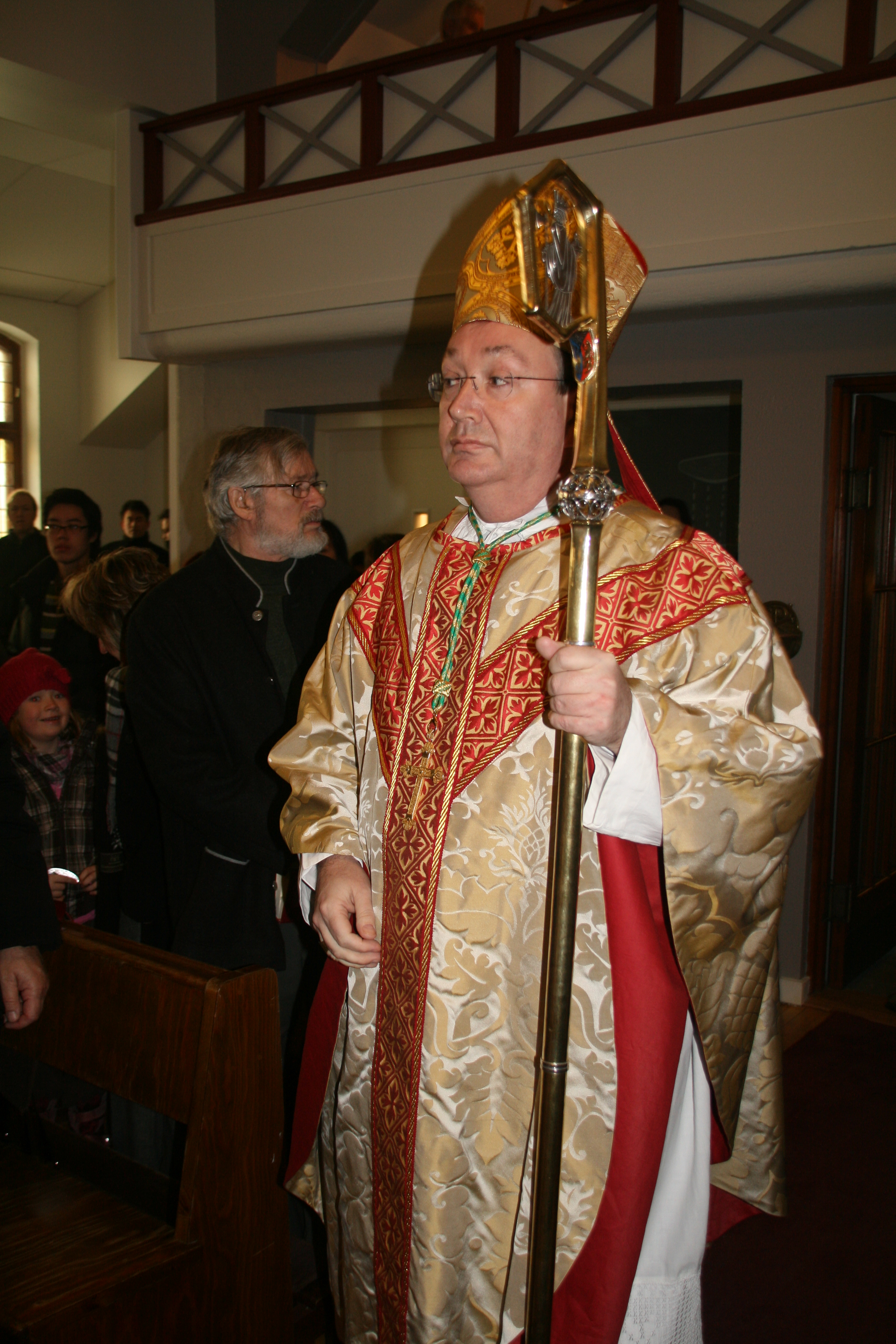
Bernt Ivar Eidsvig, 2010

=== Other public Service ===
- Sam Eyde (1866–1940), an engineer and industrialist who developed Rjukan Falls to produce hydro electrical power
- Albert Sund (1884–?), a trade union leader, Labour politician, and chairman of the Øst-Telemark faglige Samorg for three years
- Knut Haugland DSO, MM, (1917 in Rjukan – 2009), a WWII resistance fighter and explorer who accompanied Thor Heyerdahl on his famous 1947 Kon-Tiki expedition
- Einar-Fredrik Ofstad (1916 in Rjukan – 1998), a Norwegian diplomat
- Gunnar Sønsteby DSO (1918 in Rjukan – 2012), a member of the Norwegian resistance movement and Norway's most highly decorated citizen
- Petter Graver (1920 in Tinn – 1995), a jurist, diplomat from 1947 to 1988, and a lawyer
- Gunnar Odd Hagen (1921–1997), a politician and a dentist in Tinn
- Reidun Røed (1921 in Rjukan – 2009), a female Norwegian resistance member
- Bjørn Bruland (1926 in Rjukan – 2014), a Norwegian admiral and politician
- Reidar Engell Olsen (born 1933), a politician and Mayor of Tinn
- Jostein Børtnes (born 1937 in Hovin, Telemark), a literary historian and Slavist
- Signe Howell (born 1942 in Tinn), a social anthropologist and academic
- Bernt Ivar Eidsvig (born 1953 in Rjukan), a prelate of the Catholic Church and Bishop of Oslo
- Øystein Mæland (born 1960 in Rjukan), a psychiatrist, civil servant, and former politician

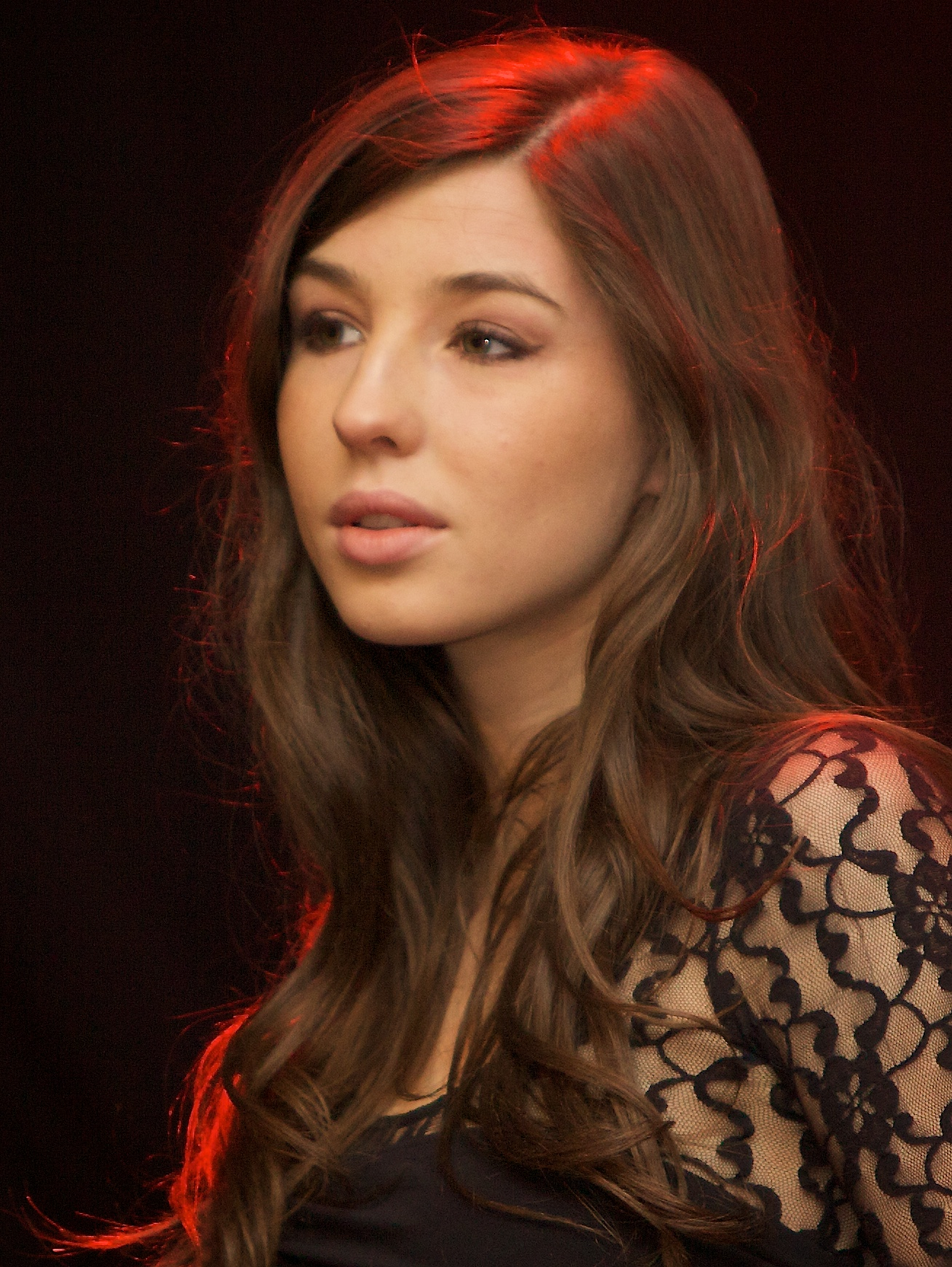
Linnea Dale, 2009

=== The Arts ===
- Knut Luraas (1782 in Tinn – 1843), a Hardingfele fiddler and artist
- Thomas Luraas (1799 in Tinn – 1886), a rose painter and clarinetist
- Else Poulsson (1909 in Rjukan – 2002), a painter and textile artist
- Jørn Lande (born 1968 in Rjukan), a hard rock and heavy metal singer and songwriter
- Linnea Dale (born 1991 in Tinn), a singer

=== Sport ===
- Snowshoe Thompson (born 1827 in Austbygdi, Telemark as Jon Torsteinsson Rue – 1876), a Norwegian-American who was considered the father of California skiing
- Jon Terje Øverland (born 1944 in Rjukan), an alpine skier who competed at the 1964 Winter Olympics and 1968 Winter Olympics

== Gallery ==
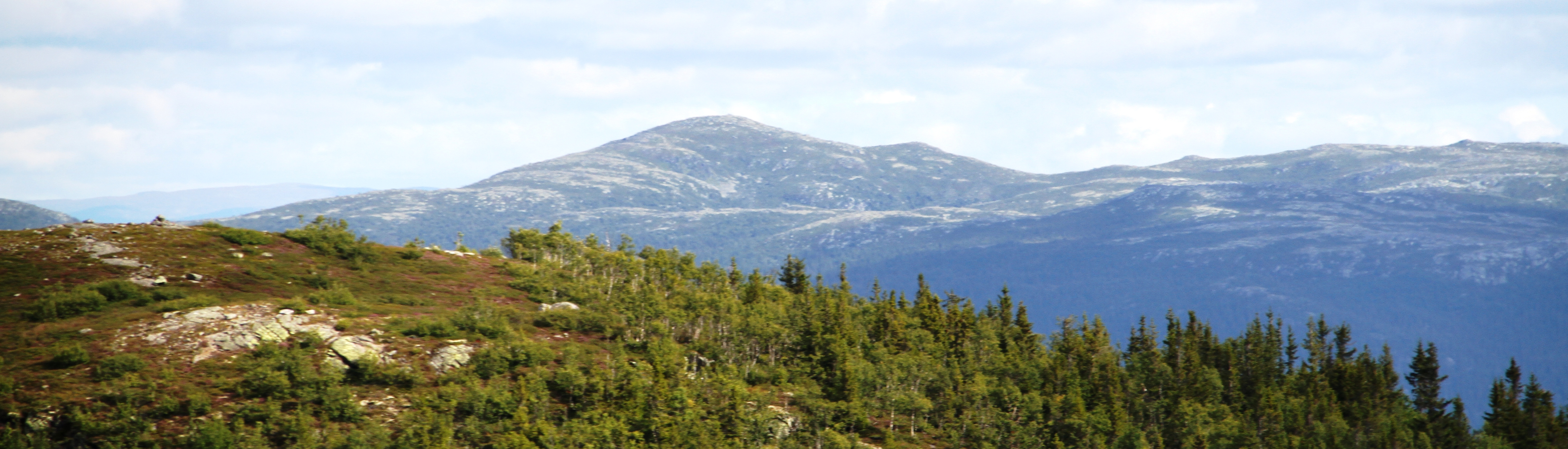
Mountains in the municipality of Tinn, near Rjukan
