= Austbygde, Telemark =

Village in Tinn Municipality, Norway

Austbygde Austbygdi Tinn Austbygd (unofficial)
- Village
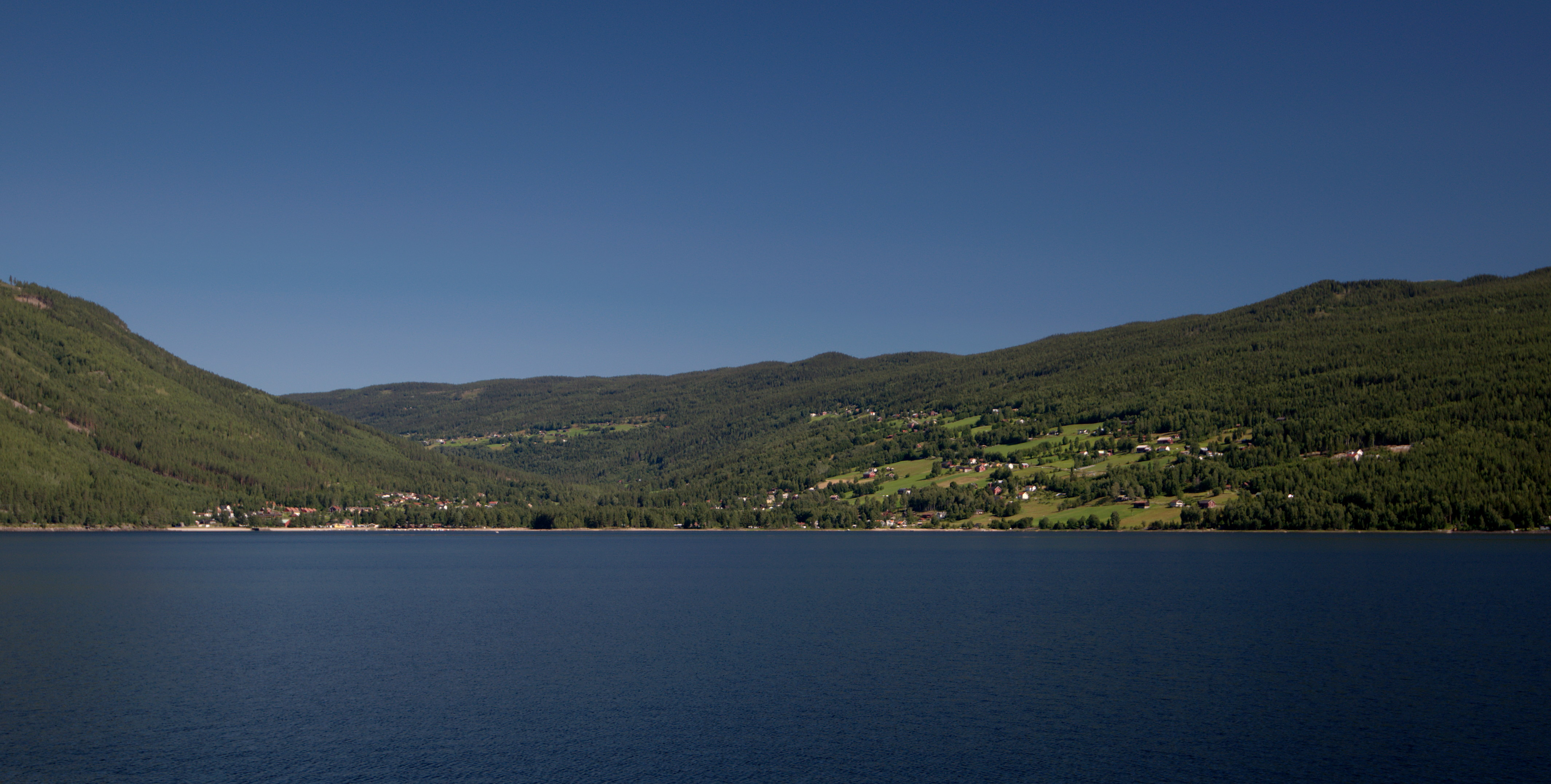
- View of the village as seen from the lake Tinnsjå to the south
- Interactive map of Austbygde
- Coordinates: 59.99554°N 8.82825°E
- Country: Norway
- Region: Eastern Norway
- County: Telemark
- District: Aust-Telemark
- Municipality: Tinn Municipality

Area
  - Total: 0.49 km^{2} (0.19 sq mi)
- Elevation: 210 m (690 ft)

Population (2025)
  - Total: 375
  - Density: 765/km^{2} (1,980/sq mi)
- Time zone: UTC+01:00 (CET)
  - Summer (DST): UTC+02:00 (CEST)
- Post Code: 3650 Tinn Austbygd

Austbygde (also known as Austbygdi or Tinn Austbygd) is a village in Tinn Municipality in Telemark county, Norway. The village is located at the northern end of the lake Tinnsjå in the lower Tessungdal valley which runs to the north from the lake. The village lies about 7 kilometres (4.3 mi) to the east of the village of Atrå and about 20 kilometres (12 mi) to the north of the village of Hovin. Austbygde Church is located at the north end of the village.

The 0.49-square-kilometre (120-acre) village has a population (2025) of 375 and a population density of 765 inhabitants per square kilometre (1,980/sq mi).

== Name ==
The approved names for the village are Austbygde (primary) and Austbygdi (secondary). Statistics Norway uses the name Tinn Austbygd, but this is not an approved name, although it is commonly used.
