= Fitjar =

Fitjar may refer to:

== Places ==
- Fitjar Municipality, a municipality in Vestland county, Norway
- Fitjar (village), a village within Fitjar Municipality in Vestland county, Norway
- Fitjar Church, a church in Fitjar Municipality in Vestland county, Norway

== Other ==
- Fitjar IL, a sports club based in Fitjar Municipality in Vestland county, Norway
- Battle of Fitjar, a historic battle in Sunnhordland, Norway
