= Moster =

Moster may refer to:

== People ==
- Edmund Moster (1873–1942), a Croatian Jewish entrepreneur, industrialist, inventor and co-founder of the "Penkala-Moster Company"
- Kjetil Møster (born 1976), a Norwegian jazz musician and composer
- Naftuli Moster (born 1986), social activist and founder of YAFFED, Young Advocates for Fair Education
- Tommy Eide Møster (born 1983), a Norwegian footballer for the team Bryne FK

== Places ==
- Moster (island), an island off the coast of the larger island of Bømlo in Vestland county, Norway
- Moster, also known as Mosterhamn, a village in Bømlo municipality in Vestland county, Norway
- Moster Municipality, a former municipality (1916–1963) in the old Hordaland county, Norway.
- Moster Church, a church in Bømlo municipality in Vestland county, Norway
- Old Moster Church, a historic church in Bømlo municipality in Vestland county, Norway

== Other ==
- Gelber Moster, a variety of white wine grape
- Moster or Chasselas, a variety of white wine grape
- Moster (motion movie poster), a high resolution animation of an original film poster authorized by the movie's film studio
