= Tora Mosterstong =

10th-century mistress to the king of Norway

- Native name: Þóra Morstrstǫng
- Partner: Harald I of Norway
- Issue: Håkon the Good

Tora Mosterstong (Old Norse: Þóra Morstrstǫng)—also known as Thora Mostaff—was one of Harald Fairhair's concubines and the mother of Håkon the Good; Harald Fairhair's youngest son and the third King of Norway (c. 935–961).

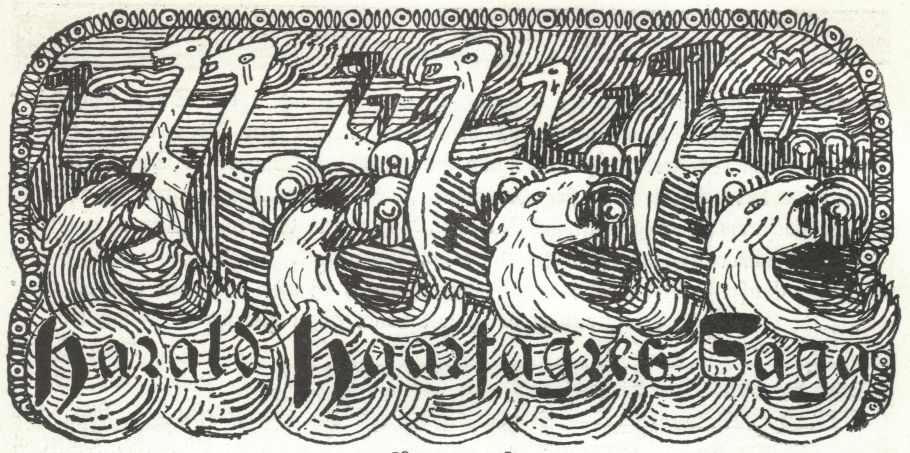
Title illustration for Snorri Sturluson's saga of Harald Fairhair.

According to Snorri Sturluson's Saga of Harald Fairhair (Haralds saga hárfagra), Tora was from the island of Moster and was descended from the clan (ætt) of Horda-Kåre (Hǫrða-Kári):

Norwegian

Da kong Harald var innpå sytti år, fekk han ein son med ei møy som heitte Tora Mosterstong; ho var ætta fra Moster. Ho var av gode folk og var skyld med Horda-Kåre. Det var ei storvaksen jente og overlag vakker. Dei kalla henne tenestjenta til kongen. Den gongen var det mange som laut tene kongen, men var av god ætt; bade karar og kvinner. Den tid var det skikk med barn til gjæve menn å ta dei beste mennene til à ause vatn på dei og gje dei namn. Da det lei så langt at Tora venta seg snart, ville ho fare til kong Harald. Han var da nord på Seim, og ho var på Moster. Ho for nordetter på skipet til Sigurd jarl. Dei lag ved land om natta; der fødde Tora eit barn oppe på hella ved landgangen, og det var ein gut. Sigurd jarl auste vatn på guten og kalla han etter far sin, Håkon Ladejarl. Guten var tidleg vakker og stor på vokster og lik far sin. Kong Harald let guten følge mor si, og dei var pả kongsgardane medan guten var ung.

— Soga om Harald Hårfagre
Translation:
English

When King Harald was nigh on seventy years old, he had a son with a maiden named Tora and was called Mosterstong; her clan was from Moster. She was of decent folk and was kin to Horda-Kåre. She was a stout woman and very beautiful. They called her the King's serving-girl. Then there were many had to serve the king though they were of high birth; menfolk as well as women. In those days it was the custom with children of important men to pick the best men to ladle the water on them and name them. When the time came that Tora expected soon, she willed to go to King Harald. He was then in the north on Seim, and she was at Moster. She headed northward on Sigurd jarl's ship. They lay ashore at night; there Tora birth a child on the slate by the gangplank, and it was a boy. Sigurd jarl ladled water on the boy and called him after his father, Håkon Ladejarl. The lad was early handsome and large of growth and like his father. King Harald let the lad follow his mother, and they were at the king's farms while the boy was young.

— Free translation

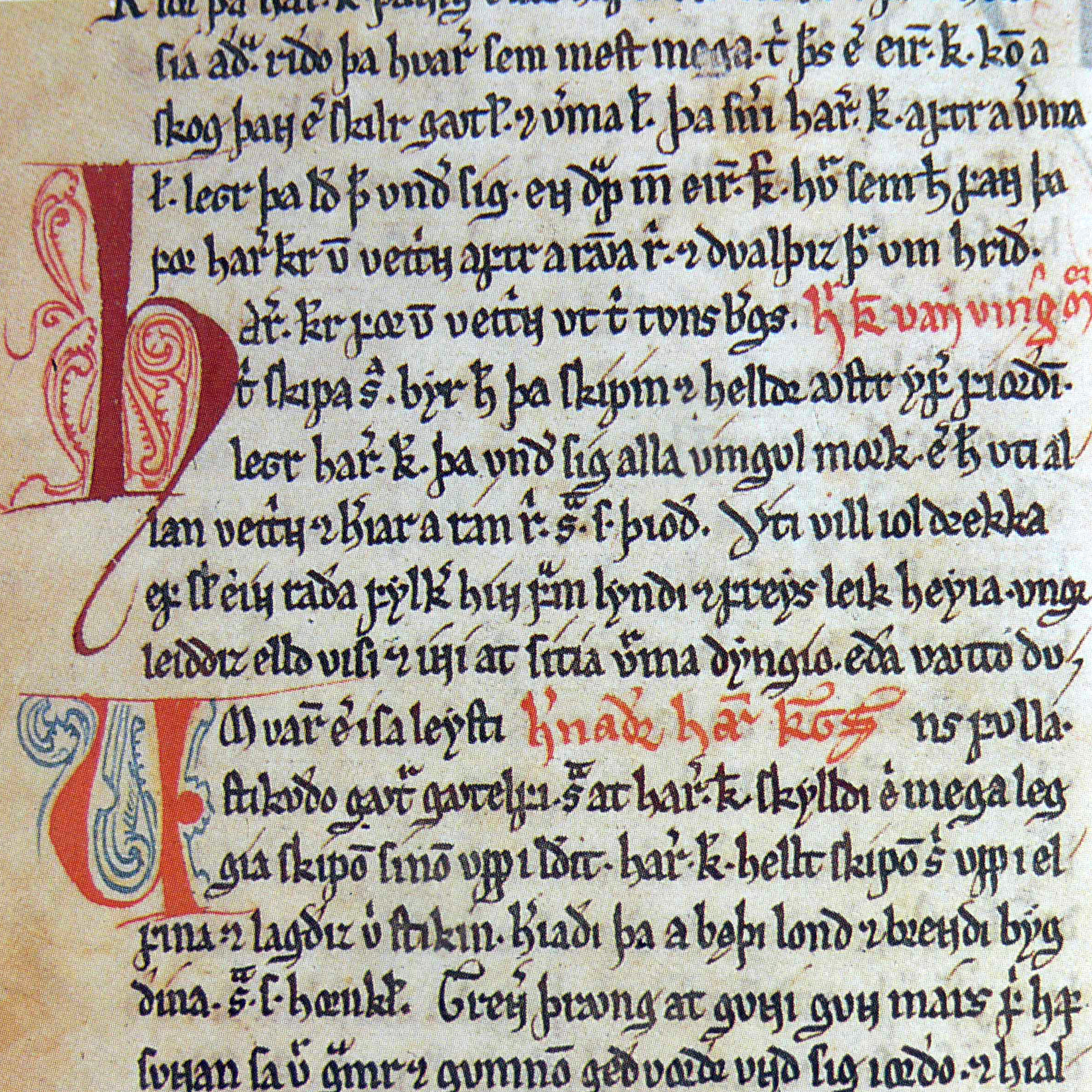
A page of the Codex Frisianus from the saga of Harald Fairhair.

Snorri consistently speaks of Tora as concubine and maidservant, which tends to produce the wrong connotations. Horda-Kåre was one of Harald Fairhair's old allies, and held high office at the Battle of Hafrsfjord. When Tora had a place with the king, it must have been part of a conscious policy to keep the two clans close.

== Sources ==
- "Tora Mostrastong". Bømlo Municipality. 14 July 2014. Archived from the original on 20 May 2016.
- Sturluson, Snorre (1979). "Soga om Harald Hårfagre". In Hødnebø, Finn; Magerøy, Hallvard (eds.). Noregs kongesoger (in Norwegian Bokmål). Vol. 1. Translated by Schjøtt, Steinar. Oslo: Det Norske Samlaget. pp. 49–78. ISBN 9788252108880 – via Nasjonalbiblioteket.
