= Stord (island) =

Island in Vestland county, Norway

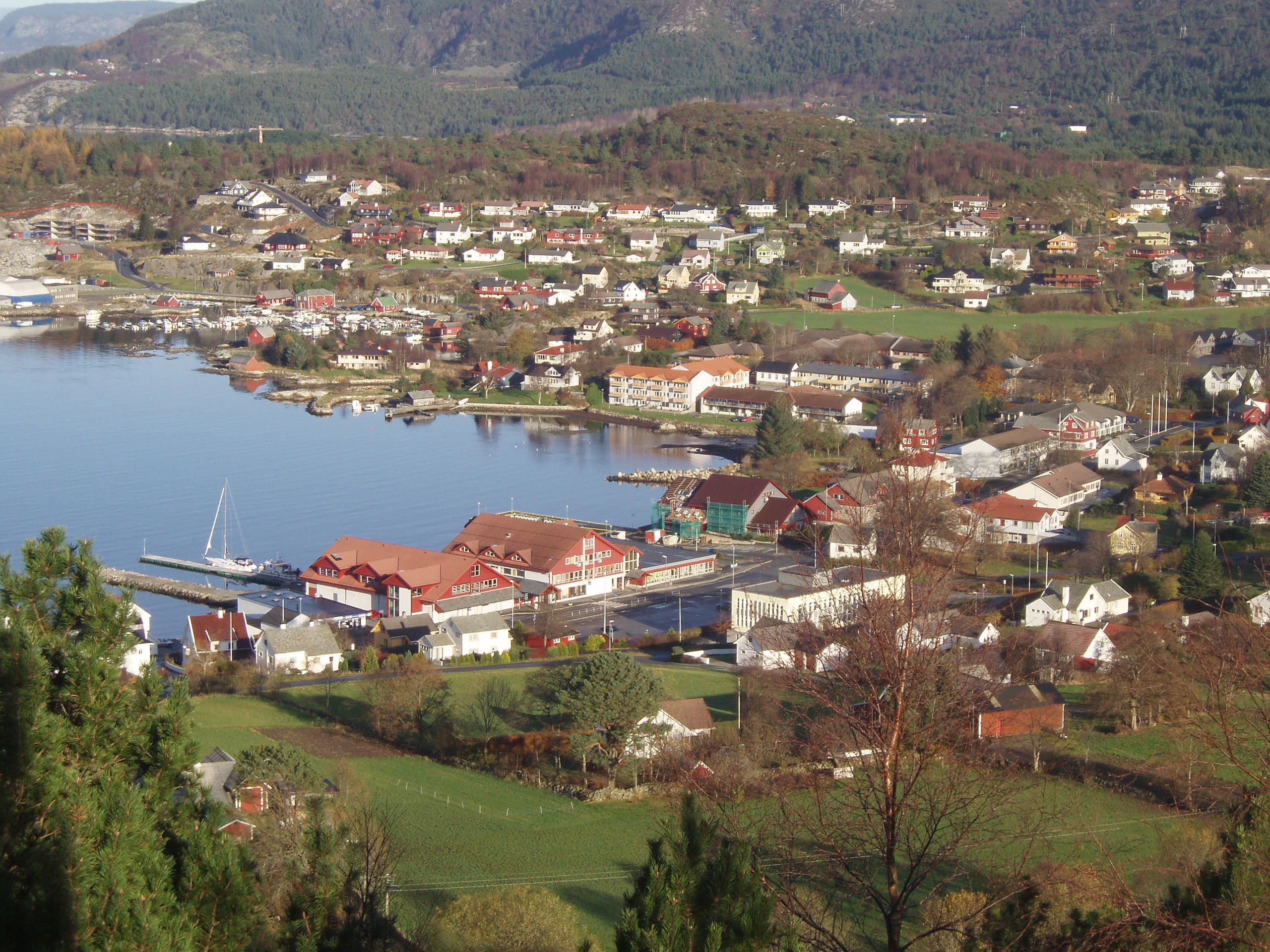
- View of the village of Fitjar
- Interactive map of the island

Geography
- Location: Vestland, Norway
- Coordinates: 59.88991°N 5.40104°E
- Area: 241.2 km^{2} (93.1 sq mi)
- Length: 27 km (16.8 mi)
- Width: 13 km (8.1 mi)
- Highest elevation: 749 m (2457 ft)
- Highest point: Mehammarsåta

Administration
- Norway
- County: Vestland
- Municipality: Stord Municipality and Fitjar Municipality

Demographics
- Population: 21,750 (2020)
- Pop. density: 90/km^{2} (230/sq mi)

Stord is an island in Vestland county, Norway. Located in the traditional district of Sunnhordland, the island is divided between Stord Municipality (southern part) and Fitjar Municipality (northern part). The largest settlements on the island are the town of Stord (granted town status in 1997) and the villages of Sagvåg and Fitjar.

== Geography ==
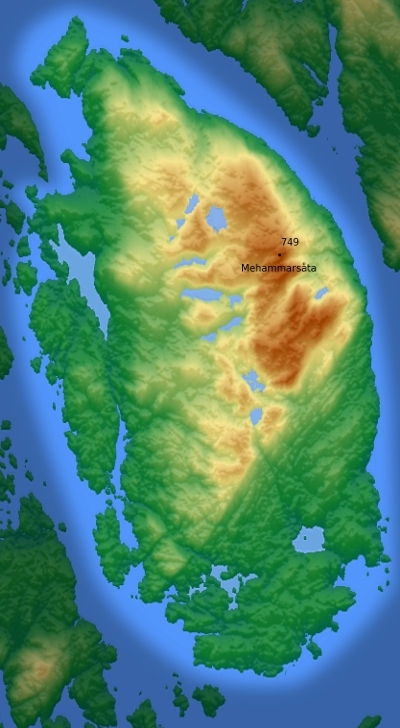
Relief map of the island

The island of Stord has an area of 241.2 square kilometres (93.1 sq mi) and the highest point is the 749-metre (2,457 ft) tall mountain Mehammarsåta. The island lies on the northern side of the mouth of the great Hardangerfjorden. The Selbjørnsfjorden lies on the north end of the island. On the east side of the island, the Langenuen strait separates Stord from the neighboring island of Tysnesøya. On the west side of the island, the Stokksundet strait separates Stord from the neighboring island of Bømlo. There are over 350 small islands and skerries lying off the northeastern coast. Most of the central part of the island is mountainous, leaving the islands population living mostly along the coasts. The vast majority of the population lives on the southern coastal area near the Hardangerfjorden.

The mountains on Stord contain a lot of pyrite. There was a pyrite mine at Litlabø until 1968. At Vikanes, there are marble quarries. The neighboring island of Huglo has limestone quarries that have been an important source of extra income since the 1500s. Beyond the lowlands, along a line from Sagvåg in the southwest to Jektevik in the northeast, rises a mountainous ridge with peaks of over 700 metres (2,300 ft). The highest of which is the 749-metre (2,457 ft) tall mountain Mehammarsåta furthest to the north. In this mountainous area, the rock varies from basalt lava, gabbro, and granite.

== History ==
The area around Fitjar has been settled since the Stone Age. At that time, the sea was 10–15 metres (33–49 ft) higher than today, which means that it went into the present lake Storavatnet and far up Fitjar river. The mild climate of the last ice age meant that much of the area was covered by forest, most probably oak, ash, and lime/linden. The area was rich with wildlife, deer, and wild boar. Archaeologists say there have been people in Fitjar for the last 10,000 years. They have made many discoveries of stone tools around Fitjar. Near the Rimbareid farm, a dwelling under a cairn was discovered by archaeologist E. de Lange in 1906. This residence is probably from the late stone age, but could also be from the early Bronze Age, since residue showed a square house, while the round house was more common in the stone age. The Rimsvarden site dates back to the Bronze Age.

Fitjar is mentioned in many of the historical sagas. Harald I had a royal residence at Fitjar, and it was there Håkon the Good was mortally wounded in the Battle of Fitjar against the sons of Eric Bloodaxe in 961. The current coat of arms of Fitjar Municipality shows a battle helmet reminiscent of the Battle of Fitjar.

During World War II, Stord Island was the location of a British-led commando raid known as "Operation Cartoon".

== Industry and business ==
The main industries found on the northern part of the island (other than the municipal government) include engineering and agriculture (including cattle and sheep farming). Fitjar ranks second after Austevoll in Sunnhordland in terms of landed volume of fish, so fishing is a major part of the economy too.

In Stord Municipality, industry began developing from 1920 until the 1970s. Manufacturing was the main industry with Kværner and Apply Leirvik as the large enterprises. Both concentrates on offshore oil installations and onshore facilities for oil recovery. Aker Solutions (Aker Stord) built supertankers of up to 370,000 tonnes (360,000 long tons; 410,000 short tons) (until 1975). When the crash of tanker market came, the company went on to build the large production platforms in the North Sea. The year 2000, manufacturing included 63% of the economically active employees within the trade and service industries, while only 1% were related to primary industries.

== Culture ==
There are two historic churches on the island: Fitjar Church, built in 1867, and Stord Church, built in 1857. Nysæter Church was built in 1992. In Hystadmarkjo, one can see 12 burial mounds, some of them have given rich finds from the Bronze Age. The Sunnhordland Museum in Leirvik has collections in their ten buildings from different places in Sunnhordland. There is also a rich collection of models made by sculptor Torleiv Agdestein from Stord. The Stord Maritime Museum in Leirvik has a rich collection also. Litlabø is the site of a mining museum that shows many interesting remains of the last 100 years of mining. Leirvik also has a great recreational center with a 25-metre (82 ft) long swimming pool.

== See also ==
- List of islands of Norway
