= Fitjar IL =

Norwegian sports club

- Full name: Fitjar Idrettslag
- Founded: 6 March 1949
- Ground: Fitjar idrettspark, Fitjar
- League: Fifth Division
Home colours

Fitjar Idrettslag is a Norwegian sports club from Fitjar Municipality in Vestland county, Norway. It has sections for football, handball, track and field, orienteering, gymnastics, badminton and table tennis.

The club was founded on 6 March 1949. The men's football team currently resides in the Fifth Division (sixth tier). It last played in the Third Division in 2007.
