= Harald Greycloak =

King of Norway from 961 to c. 970

King of Norway
- Reign: 961 – c. 970
- Predecessor: Haakon the Good
- Successor: Harald Bluetooth
- Born: c. 935
- Died: c. 970; Limfjord
- House: Fairhair dynasty
- Father: Eric Bloodaxe
- Mother: Gunnhild

Harald Greycloak (Old Norse: Haraldr gráfeldr, lit. 'Harald Grey-hide'; Norwegian: Harald Gråfell; Danish: Harald Gråfeld; c. 935 – c. 970) was a king of Norway from the Fairhair dynasty.

Harald acquired his nickname "Gray-hide" after an encounter with the crew of an Icelandic merchant ship which carried a large load of vararfeldir, a type of faux fur made from sheep's wool. The Icelanders were having trouble selling their faux furs so when the king asked them if they would make a present to him of one of the furs, which happened to be grey, the sailors did not hesitate and the king immediately used it as a cloak. This set an instant fashion trend and before long the Icelanders had sold their entire load of previously unsalable furs to the king's men and the locals. Harald was ever after known as Harald "Gray-hide".

Harald was the son of Eric Bloodaxe and a grandson of Harald Fairhair. His mother was Gunnhild, the sister of King Harald Bluetooth.

After his father's death in 954, Harald and his brothers allied with their uncle, King Harald Bluetooth, against their half-uncle King Haakon the Good. They fought several battles against King Haakon including the Battle of Rastarkalv near the island of Frei in 955 and the Battle of Fitjar in 961.

After King Haakon's death at Fitjar, Harald and his brothers became kings of Norway, but they had little authority outside Western Norway. Harald, by being the oldest, was the most powerful of the brothers. In 961, their uncle King Harald Bluetooth of Denmark traveled to Norway and declared Harald Greycloak to be his vassal jarl in Norway.

Harald moved to strengthen his rule by killing the local rulers including Sigurd Haakonsson, Tryggve Olafsson and Gudrød Bjørnsson. Harald Greycloak thus took power over the country up to and including Hålogaland. Harald established control over the trade route along the Norwegian coast. He also undertook a Viking expedition to Bjarmaland, today the area of Arkhangelsk in northern Russia. Harald soon became less dependent on support from Harald Bluetooth.

In 970, he was tricked into coming to Denmark and killed in Hals in the Limfjord in a plot planned by Sigurd Haakonsson's son Haakon, who had become an ally of Harald Bluetooth. Haakon Sigurdsson had become the jarl of Lade after his own father was killed by Harald Greycloak's men in the autumn of 962. The surviving brothers of Harald Greyhide fled the country after his death. With the death of Harald Greycloak, King Harald Bluetooth won back power over Norway and he supported Haakon Sigurdsson as his vassal king.

== Other sources ==
- Krag, Claus Harald Gråfell in Norsk biografisk leksikon 2. utg. Bd 4, 2001.
- Koht, Halvdan Harald Graafeld in Norsk biografisk leksikon, 1. utg. Bd 5, 1931.

Harald Greycloak Fairhair dynasty Died: 970
Regnal titles
Preceded by Haakon the Good	King of Norway; 961–970	Vacant Rule of Haakon Sigurdsson Title next held by Harald Bluetooth
