= Harald of Norway =

Harald of Norway may refer to the following monarchs of the Kingdom of Norway:

- Harald Fairhair (Harald I, c. 848 – c. 931)
- Harald Greycloak (Harald II, c. 935 – c. 970)
- Harald Hardrada (Harald III, 1015 – 1066)
- Harald Gille (Harald IV, died 1136)
- Harald V (1937 – 2026)
