= Haakon the Good =

King of Norway from 934 to 961

- Håkon den gode, 1860. Oil on canvas by Peter Nicolai Arbo.

King of Norway
- Reign: 934–961
- Predecessor: Eric Bloodaxe
- Successor: Harald Greycloak
- Born: c. 920; Håkonshella, Hordaland, Norway
- Died: 961; Håkonshella, Hordaland (fatally wounded in the Battle of Fitjar)
- Burial: Seim, Hordaland, Norway
- Issue: Thora
- House: Fairhair
- Father: Harald Fairhair
- Mother: Thora Mosterstong
- Religion: Chalcedonian Christianity prev. Norse paganism

Haakon Haraldsson (c. 920–961), also Haakon the Good (Old Norse: Hákon góði, Norwegian: Håkon den gode) and Haakon Adalsteinfostre (Old Norse: Hákon Aðalsteinsfóstri, Norwegian: Håkon Adalsteinsfostre), was the king of Norway from 934 to 961. He was noted for his attempts to introduce Christianity into Norway.

== Early life ==
Haakon is not mentioned in any narrative sources earlier than the late 12th century. According to this late saga tradition, Haakon was the youngest son of King Harald Fairhair and Thora Mosterstang. He was born on the Håkonshella peninsula in Hordaland. King Harald determined to remove his youngest son out of harm's way and accordingly sent him to the court of King Æthelstan. Haakon was fostered by King Athelstan, as part of an agreement made by his father, for which reason Haakon was nicknamed Adalsteinfostre. According to the Sagas, Athelstan was tricked into fostering Haakon when Harald's envoy used the custom of knésetja, whereby a child was formally adopted if it was set on the knees of the foster-parent. Becoming someone's foster-parent reportedly meant that they were subordinate to the child's parent.

Haakon is not mentioned in any contemporary Anglo-Saxon sources, and later historians of Athelstan, such as William of Malmesbury, make no reference to Haakon. According to Norwegian royal biographies from the late 12th century, the English court introduced him to the Christian religion. On the news of his father's death, King Athelstan provided Haakon with ships and men for an expedition against his half-brother Eric Bloodaxe, who had been proclaimed king of Norway. Historia Norwegiæ describes Haakon as an apostate who observed both pagan and Christian rites.

== Reign ==
At his arrival back in Norway, Haakon gained the support of the landowners by promising to give up the rights of taxation claimed by his father over inherited real property. Eric Bloodaxe soon found himself deserted on all sides, and saved his own and his family's lives by fleeing from the country. Eric fled to the Orkney Islands and later to the Kingdom of Jorvik, eventually meeting a violent death at Stainmore, Westmorland, in 954 along with his son, Haeric.

In 953, Haakon had to fight a fierce battle (Slaget på Blodeheia ved Avaldsnes) at Avaldsnes against the sons of Eric Bloodaxe (Eirikssønnene). Haakon won the battle, at which Eric's son Guttorm died. One of Haakon's most famous victories was the Battle of Rastarkalv (Slaget på Rastarkalv) near Frei in 955 at which Eric's son, Gamle, died. By placing ten standards far apart along a low ridge, he gave the impression that his army was bigger than it actually was. He managed to fool Eric's sons into believing that they were outnumbered. The Danes fled and were slaughtered by Haakon's army. The sons of Eric returned in 957, with support from King Gorm the Old, King of Denmark, but were again defeated by Haakon's effective army system.

Skaldic poems and the Icelandic sagas link the introduction of the leiðangr naval system in Norway to Haakon. Haakon may have emulated King Æthelstan's naval system.

== Succession ==
Three of the surviving sons of Eric Bloodaxe landed undetected on the coast of Hordaland in 961 and surprised the king at his residence in Fitjar. Haakon was mortally wounded at the Battle of Fitjar (Slaget ved Fitjar) after a final victory over Eric's sons. The King's arm was pierced by an arrow and he died later from his wounds. He was buried in the burial mound (Håkonshaugen) in the village of Seim in what is now the present-day Alver Municipality in Vestland county. Upon his death his court poet, Eyvindr skáldaspillir, composed a skaldic poem Hákonarmál about the fall of the King in battle and his reception into Valhalla.

After Haakon's death, Harald Greycloak, the eldest surviving son of Eric Bloodaxe, ascended the throne as King Harald II, although he had little authority outside western Norway. Subsequently, the Norwegians were tormented by years of war. In 970, King Harald was tricked into coming to Denmark and killed in a plot planned by Haakon Sigurdsson, who had become an ally of King Harald Bluetooth.

== Modern references ==
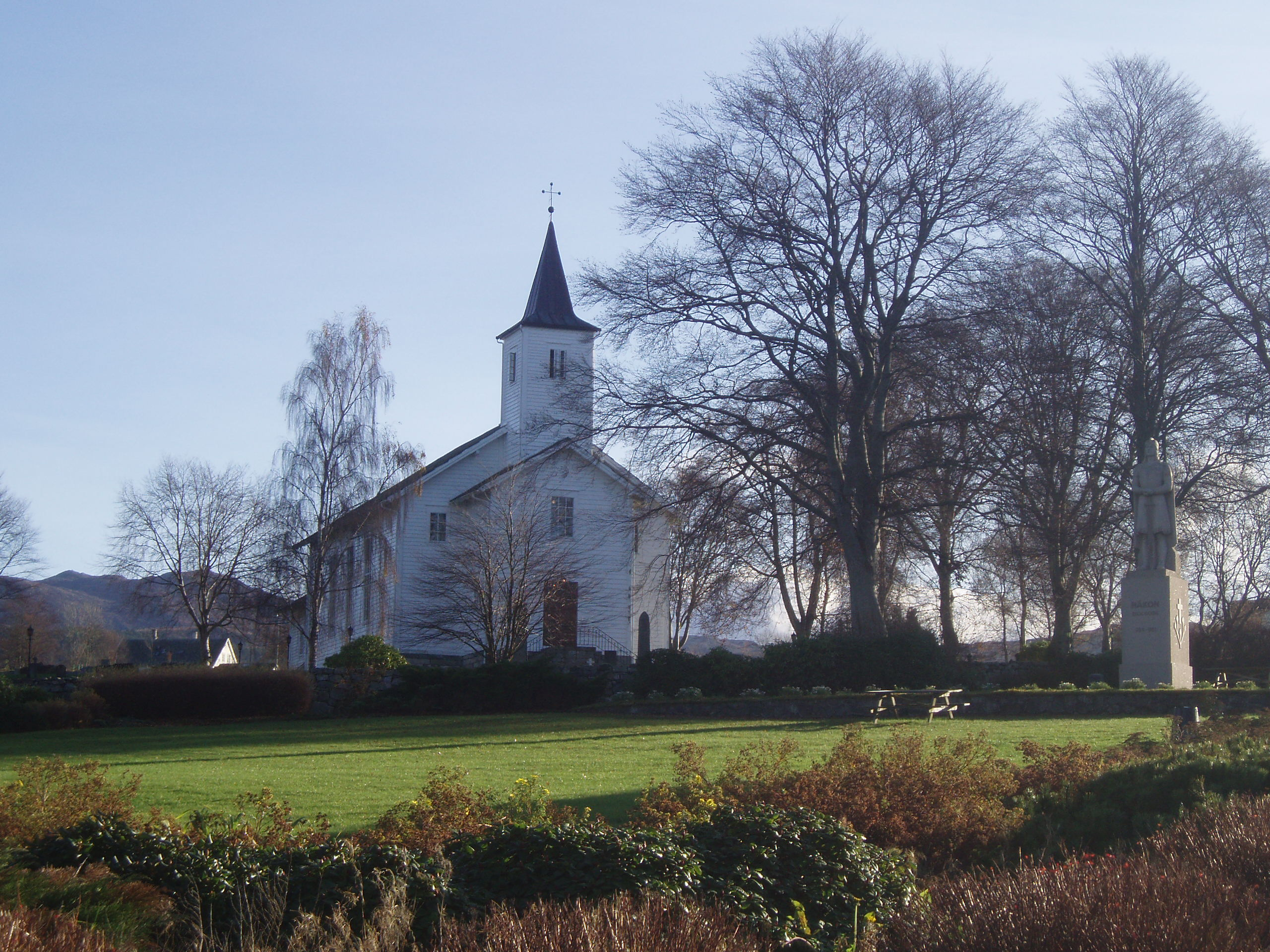
Haakon's Park (Håkonarparken) opposite Fitjar Church (Fitjar kyrkje)

- Haakon's Park (Håkonarparken) is the location of a statue of King Haakon sculpted by Anne Grimdalen. During 1961, the statue was erected opposite Fitjar Church for the one thousand-year commemoration of the Battle of Fitjar.
- Håkonarspelet is a historical play written by Johannes Heggland in 1997.
- Haakon is a major character in Mother of Kings by Poul Anderson.
- Haakon is the protagonist in God's Hammer by Eric Schumacher.

== See also ==
- Hákonarmál

== Sources ==
- Birkeli, Fridtjov (1979) Norge møter kristendommen fra vikingtiden til ca. 1050 (Oslo: Aschehoug & Co) ISBN 9788203087912
- Enstad, Nils-Petter (2008) Sverd eller kors? Kristningen av Norge som politisk prosess fra Håkon den gode til Olav Kyrre (Kolofon forlag) ISBN 9788230003947
- Krag, Claus (1995) Vikingtid og rikssamling 800–1130 (Oslo: Aschehoug's History of Norway, Bd. 2) ISBN 9788203220159
- Sigurdsson, Jon Vidar and Synnøve Veinan Hellerud (2012) Håkon den gode (Oslo: Spartacus forlag AS) ISBN 9788243005778
- van Nahl, Jan Alexander (2016). "The Medieval Mood of Contingency. Chance as a Shaping Factor in Hákonar saga góða and Haralds saga Sigurðarsonar". In: Mediaevistik, International Journal of Interdisciplinary Medieval Research 29. pp. 81–97.

Haakon the Good Fairhair dynasty Died: 961
Regnal titles
Preceded by Eric Bloodaxe	King of Norway; 934–961	Succeeded by Harald Greycloak
