= Otto Hageberg =

Norwegian literary historian

Otto Annkjell Hageberg (12 July 1936 – 24 November 2014) was a Norwegian literary historian.

He was born in Fitjar Municipality. He was hired at the University of Oslo in 1964, and was promoted to professor in 1985. He was a member of the Norwegian Academy of Science and Letters. Notable releases include Frå Camilla Collett til Dag Solstad. Spenningsmønster i litterære tekstar (1980) and På spor etter meining. Essay om samtidslitteratur og om litterær tradisjon (1994), and he has biographed Olav Duun and Ragnvald Skrede. He retired as a professor in 2006.

He died in November 2014.
