= Fitjar Municipality =

Municipality in Vestland, Norway

Fitjar Municipality Fitjar kommune
- Municipality
- Fitje herred (historic name)
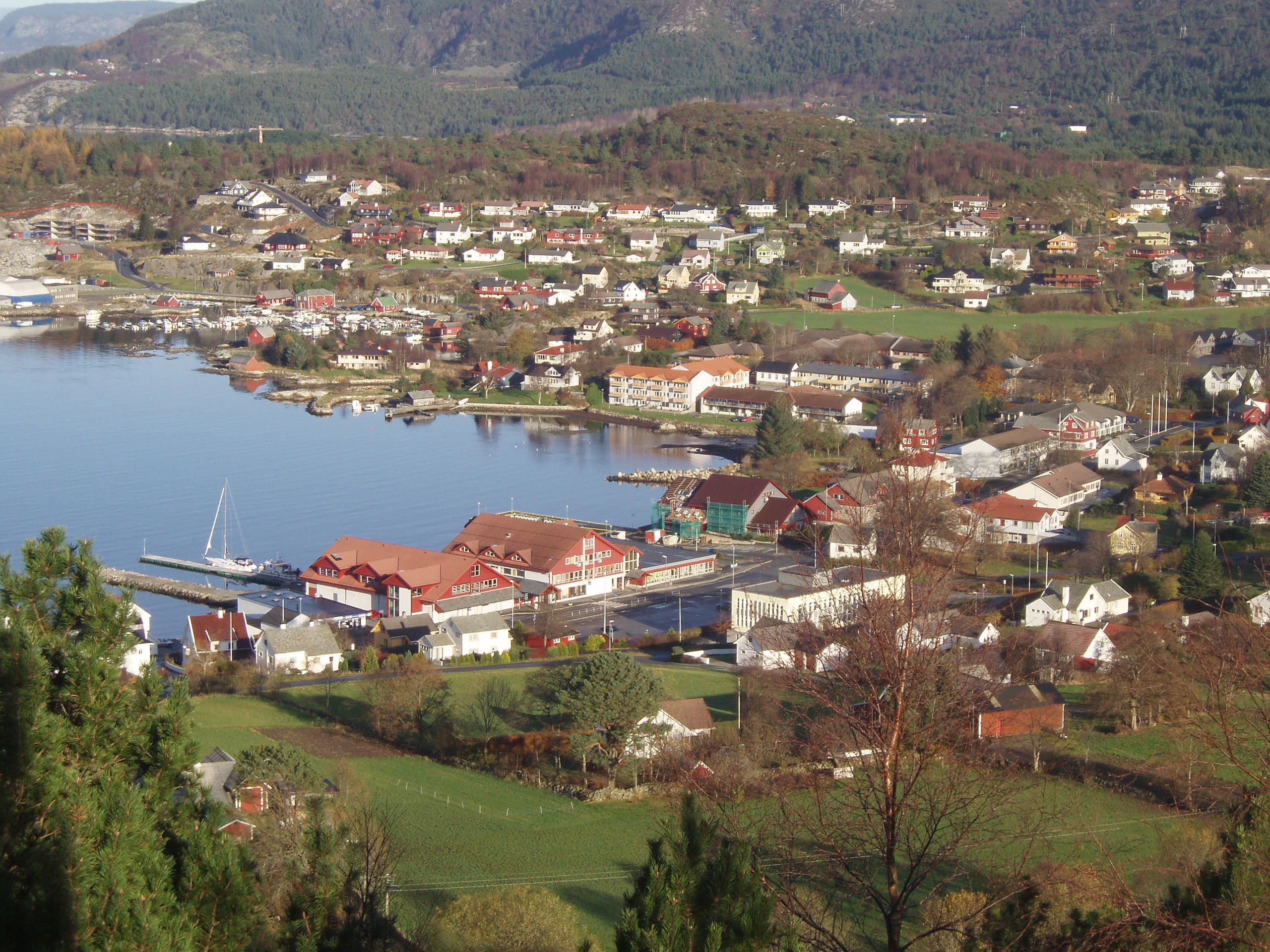
- View of the village of Fitjar

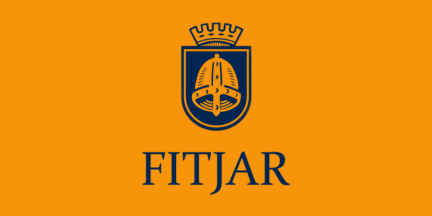
- Flag Coat of arms

- Vestland within Norway

- Fitjar within Vestland
- Coordinates: 59°55′08″N 05°22′17″E
- Country: Norway
- County: Vestland
- District: Sunnhordland
- Established: 1 Jan 1863
  - Preceded by: Stord Municipality
- Administrative centre: Fitjar

Government
  - Mayor (2023): Wenche Tislevoll (H)

Area
  - Total: 142.47 km^{2} (55.01 sq mi)
  - Land: 134.50 km^{2} (51.93 sq mi)
  - Water: 7.97 km^{2} (3.08 sq mi) 5.6%
  - Rank: #318 in Norway
- Highest elevation: 678.62 m (2,226.4 ft)

Population (2025)
  - Total: 3,208
  - Rank: #224 in Norway
  - Density: 22.5/km^{2} (58/sq mi)
  - Change (10 years): ▲ +6.4%
- Demonym: Fitjabu

Official language
  - Norwegian form: Nynorsk
- Time zone: UTC+01:00 (CET)
  - Summer (DST): UTC+02:00 (CEST)
- ISO 3166 code: NO-4615
- Website: Official website

Fitjar (Norwegian pronunciation: [ˈfɪ̂tːjɑr]) is a municipality in Vestland county, Norway. The municipality is located in the traditional district of Sunnhordland. Fitjar Municipality includes the northern part of the island of Stord and the hundreds of surrounding islands, mostly to the northwest of the main island. The administrative centre of the municipality is the village of Fitjar.

The 142.47-square-kilometre (55.01 sq mi) municipality is the 318th largest by area out of the 357 municipalities in Norway. Fitjar Municipality is the 224th most populous municipality in Norway with a population of 3,208. The municipality's population density is 22.5 inhabitants per square kilometre (58/sq mi) and its population has increased by 6.4% over the previous 10-year period.

== General information ==
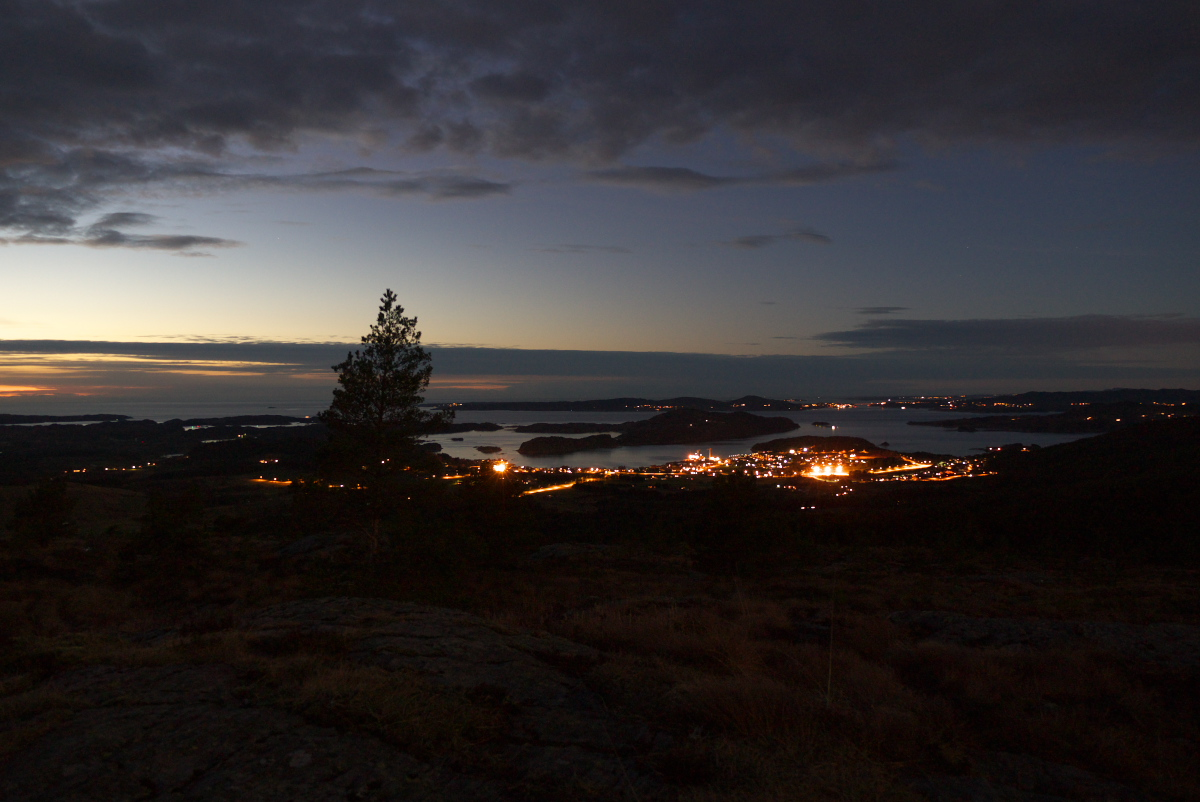
View of Fitjar by night

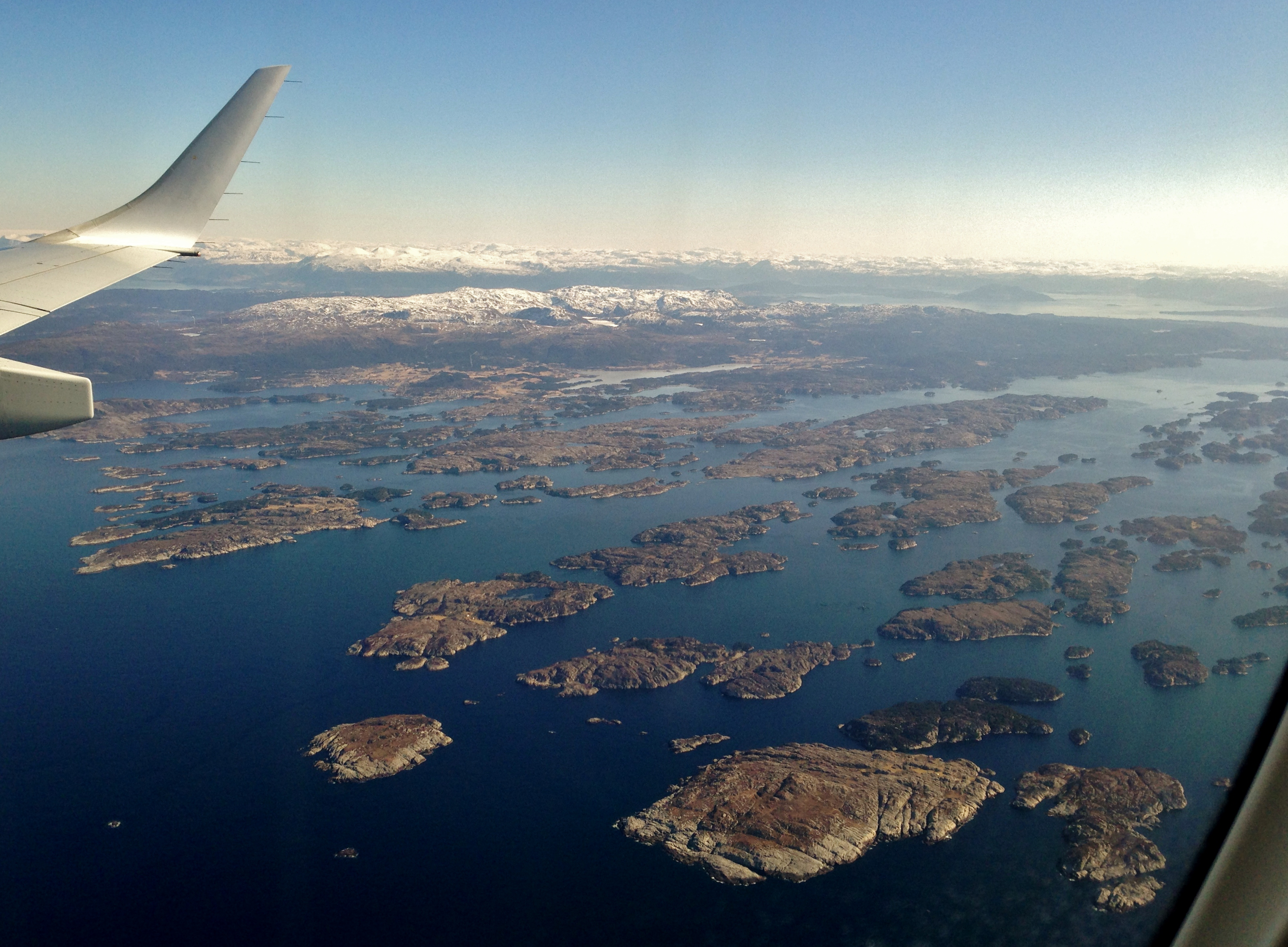
Aerial view of the Fitjar islands

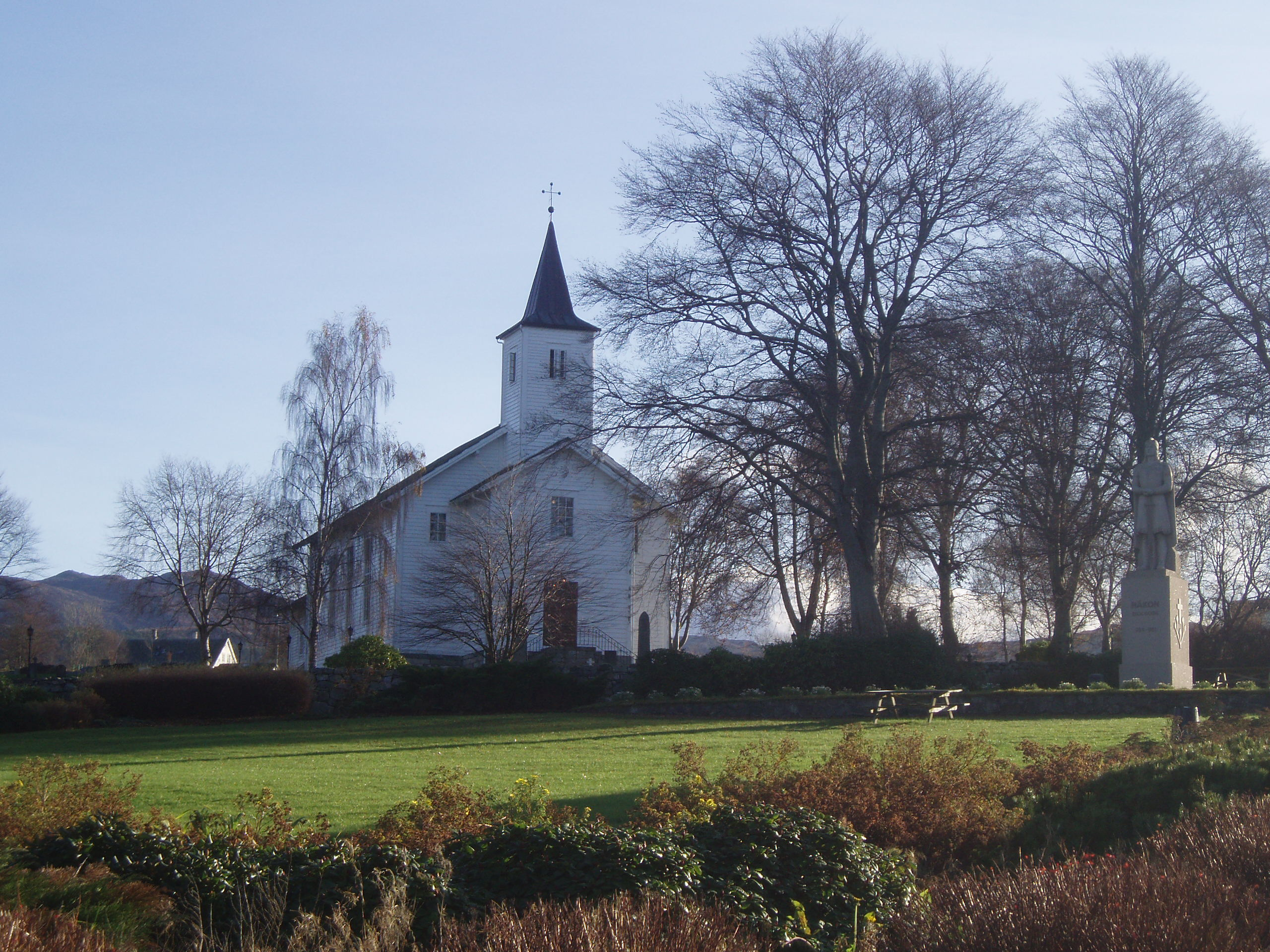
Fitjar Church

The parish of Fitje (later spelled Fitjar) was established as a municipality on 1 January 1863 when it was separated from the large Stord Municipality. Initially, the population of Fitje Municipality was 2,313. On 1 January 1868, a small area of Finnaas Municipality (population: 10) was transferred to Fitje Municipality. In 1900, the name was changed to Fitjar Municipality. The original municipality included all of the land surrounding the Selbjørnsfjorden (on the north side and south side of the fjord).

During the 1960s, there were many municipal mergers across Norway due to the work of the Schei Committee. On 1 January 1964, the area of Fitjar located north of the Selbjørnsfjorden on the islands of Huftarøy and Selbjørn (population: 696) was transferred to the neighboring Austevoll Municipality. On 1 January 1995, the islands of Aga, Agasystra, Gisøya, Vikøya, Selsøy, Risøya, and many smaller surrounding islands (population: 225) were transferred from Fitjar Municipality to the neighboring Bømlo Municipality. These islands had recently been connected to Bømlo by road bridges which precipitated the municipal transfer.

Historically, this municipality was part of the old Hordaland county. On 1 January 2020, the municipality became a part of the newly-formed Vestland county (after Hordaland and Sogn og Fjordane counties were merged).

=== Name ===
The municipality (originally the parish) is named after the old Fitjar farm (Old Norse: Fitjar) since the first Fitjar Church was built there. The name is the plural form of fit which means "meadow along the water" or "lush meadow". Before 1900, the name was written "Fitje".

=== Coat of arms ===
The coat of arms was adopted during the late 1940s, but they have never been formally granted since they did not meet the formal government design requirements. In 2018, the municipal council of Fitjar formally approved the arms after a change to a national law. The blazon is "Azure, a Viking helmet Or within a orle argent". This means the arms have a blue field (background) and the charge is a Viking helmet with a thin border around the edge of the shield. The charge has a tincture of Or which means it is commonly colored yellow, but if it is made out of metal, then gold is used. The arms often have a mural crown depicted above the escutcheon. The helmet and the color are derived from the belief that King Haakon the Good wore a golden helmet at the Battle of Fitjar in 961, which was fought in this municipality. King Haakon died from his wounds. His death and reception in Valhalla are described in the skaldic poem Hákonarmál, composed by the Eyvindr skáldaspillir. The arms were designed by Magnus Hardeland. The municipal flag is orange with a depiction of coat of arms in the centre along with the name of the municipality below the arms.

=== Churches ===
The Church of Norway has one parish (sokn) within Fitjar Municipality. It is part of the Sunnhordland prosti (deanery) in the Diocese of Bjørgvin.

Churches in Fitjar Municipality
Parish (sokn)	Church name	Location of the church	Year built
Fitjar	Fitjar Church	Fitjar	1867

== History ==
King Haakon I of Norway (Haakon the Good) maintained his residence at Fitjar. The Battle of Fitjar (Slaget ved Fitjar på Stord) took place in Fitjar on the island of Stord in the year 961 between the forces of King Haakon I and the sons of his half-brother, Eric Bloodaxe. Traditionally, important shipping routes have passed through the area, and the municipality contains several trading posts dating as far back as 1648.

== Population ==
Historical population

Year	Pop.	±% p.a.
1863	2,313	—
1865	2,308	−0.11%
1875	2,334	+0.11%
1891	2,380	+0.12%
1900	2,487	+0.49%
1910	2,632	+0.57%

Year	Pop.	±% p.a.
1920	2,654	+0.08%
1930	2,833	+0.65%
1946	3,036	+0.43%
1951	3,092	+0.37%
1960	3,172	+0.28%
1970	2,520	−2.27%

Year	Pop.	±% p.a.
1980	2,888	+1.37%
1990	3,072	+0.62%
2000	2,992	−0.26%
2010	2,931	−0.21%
2020	3,189	+0.85%
2023	3,181	−0.08%

Note: The municipal borders were changed in 1964 and 1995, causing a significant change in the population.
Source: Statistics Norway and Norwegian Historical Data Centre

== Geography ==
Fitjar Municipality lies south of the Selbjørnsfjorden, west of the Langenuen strait, east of the island of Bømlo. The municipality includes over 350 islands, although most are uninhabited. The majority of the residents live on the island of Stord, the northern portion of which is in Fitjar Municipality. The southern portion of the island is part of Stord Municipality. Austevoll Municipality lies on islands to the north, across the fjord and Tysnes Municipality lies on islands across the Langenuen strait to the east, and Bømlo Municipality lies on islands to the west. The highest point in the municipality is the 678.62-metre (2,226.4 ft) tall mountain Fitjarhesten, located a short distance northwest of Mehammarsåta.

== Government ==
Fitjar Municipality is responsible for primary education (through 10th grade), outpatient health services, senior citizen services, welfare and other social services, zoning, economic development, and municipal roads and utilities. The municipality is governed by a municipal council of directly elected representatives. The mayor is indirectly elected by a vote of the municipal council. The municipality is under the jurisdiction of the Haugaland og Sunnhordland District Court and the Gulating Court of Appeal.

=== Municipal council ===
The municipal council (Kommunestyre) of Fitjar Municipality is made up of 17 representatives that are elected to four year terms. The tables below show the current and historical composition of the council by political party.

Fitjar kommunestyre 2023–2027
Party name (in Nynorsk)	Number of representatives
Labour Party (Arbeidarpartiet)	2
Progress Party (Framstegspartiet)	3
Conservative Party (Høgre)	5
Industry and Business Party (Industri‑ og Næringspartiet)	1
Christian Democratic Party (Kristeleg Folkeparti)	5
Centre Party (Senterpartiet)	1
Total number of members:	17

Fitjar kommunestyre 2019–2023
Party name (in Nynorsk)	Number of representatives
Labour Party (Arbeidarpartiet)	3
Progress Party (Framstegspartiet)	2
Conservative Party (Høgre)	3
Christian Democratic Party (Kristeleg Folkeparti)	6
Centre Party (Senterpartiet)	3
Total number of members:	17

Fitjar kommunestyre 2015–2019
Party name (in Nynorsk)	Number of representatives
Labour Party (Arbeidarpartiet)	3
Progress Party (Framstegspartiet)	2
Conservative Party (Høgre)	7
Christian Democratic Party (Kristeleg Folkeparti)	3
Centre Party (Senterpartiet)	2
Total number of members:	17

Fitjar kommunestyre 2011–2015
Party name (in Nynorsk)	Number of representatives
Labour Party (Arbeidarpartiet)	3
Progress Party (Framstegspartiet)	1
Conservative Party (Høgre)	7
Christian Democratic Party (Kristeleg Folkeparti)	4
Centre Party (Senterpartiet)	2
Total number of members:	17

Fitjar kommunestyre 2007–2011
Party name (in Nynorsk)	Number of representatives
Labour Party (Arbeidarpartiet)	4
Progress Party (Framstegspartiet)	1
Conservative Party (Høgre)	4
Christian Democratic Party (Kristeleg Folkeparti)	3
Centre Party (Senterpartiet)	3
Socialist Left Party (Sosialistisk Venstreparti)	1
Liberal Party (Venstre)	1
Total number of members:	17

Fitjar kommunestyre 2003–2007
Party name (in Nynorsk)	Number of representatives
Labour Party (Arbeidarpartiet)	6
Progress Party (Framstegspartiet)	2
Conservative Party (Høgre)	2
Christian Democratic Party (Kristeleg Folkeparti)	4
Centre Party (Senterpartiet)	2
Socialist Left Party (Sosialistisk Venstreparti)	1
Total number of members:	17

Fitjar kommunestyre 1999–2003
Party name (in Nynorsk)	Number of representatives
Labour Party (Arbeidarpartiet)	5
Progress Party (Framstegspartiet)	3
Conservative Party (Høgre)	3
Christian Democratic Party (Kristeleg Folkeparti)	6
Centre Party (Senterpartiet)	3
Socialist Left Party (Sosialistisk Venstreparti)	1
Total number of members:	21

Fitjar kommunestyre 1995–1999
Party name (in Nynorsk)	Number of representatives
Labour Party (Arbeidarpartiet)	3
Progress Party (Framstegspartiet)	2
Conservative Party (Høgre)	4
Christian Democratic Party (Kristeleg Folkeparti)	5
Centre Party (Senterpartiet)	4
Socialist Left Party (Sosialistisk Venstreparti)	3
Total number of members:	21

Fitjar kommunestyre 1991–1995
Party name (in Nynorsk)	Number of representatives
Labour Party (Arbeidarpartiet)	3
Progress Party (Framstegspartiet)	3
Conservative Party (Høgre)	3
Christian Democratic Party (Kristeleg Folkeparti)	5
Centre Party (Senterpartiet)	4
Socialist Left Party (Sosialistisk Venstreparti)	2
Liberal Party (Venstre)	1
Total number of members:	21

Fitjar kommunestyre 1987–1991
Party name (in Nynorsk)	Number of representatives
Labour Party (Arbeidarpartiet)	5
Progress Party (Framstegspartiet)	2
Conservative Party (Høgre)	4
Christian Democratic Party (Kristeleg Folkeparti)	6
Centre Party (Senterpartiet)	2
Liberal Party (Venstre)	1
Local list for the islands in Fitjar (Kretsliste for øyane i Fitjar)	1
Total number of members:	21

Fitjar kommunestyre 1983–1987
Party name (in Nynorsk)	Number of representatives
Labour Party (Arbeidarpartiet)	5
Conservative Party (Høgre)	4
Christian Democratic Party (Kristeleg Folkeparti)	6
Centre Party (Senterpartiet)	2
Liberal Party (Venstre)	2
Local list for the islands (Kretsliste for Øyane)	2
Total number of members:	21

Fitjar kommunestyre 1979–1983
Party name (in Nynorsk)	Number of representatives
Labour Party (Arbeidarpartiet)	3
Conservative Party (Høgre)	5
Christian Democratic Party (Kristeleg Folkeparti)	7
Centre Party (Senterpartiet)	2
Liberal Party (Venstre)	2
Local list for the islands in Fitjar (Krinsliste for Øyane i Fitjar)	2
Total number of members:	21

Fitjar kommunestyre 1975–1979
Party name (in Nynorsk)	Number of representatives
Labour Party (Arbeidarpartiet)	4
Conservative Party (Høgre)	4
Christian Democratic Party (Kristeleg Folkeparti)	8
New People's Party (Nye Folkepartiet)	1
Centre Party (Senterpartiet)	2
Local list for the islands in Fitjar (Krinsliste for Øyane i Fitjar)	2
Total number of members:	21

Fitjar kommunestyre 1971–1975
Party name (in Nynorsk)	Number of representatives
Labour Party (Arbeidarpartiet)	4
Conservative Party (Høgre)	3
Christian Democratic Party (Kristeleg Folkeparti)	7
Centre Party (Senterpartiet)	3
Liberal Party (Venstre)	2
Local List(s) (Lokale lister)	2
Total number of members:	21

Fitjar kommunestyre 1967–1971
Party name (in Nynorsk)	Number of representatives
Labour Party (Arbeidarpartiet)	4
Conservative Party (Høgre)	3
Christian Democratic Party (Kristeleg Folkeparti)	5
Centre Party (Senterpartiet)	3
Liberal Party (Venstre)	4
Local List(s) (Lokale lister)	2
Total number of members:	21

Fitjar kommunestyre 1963–1967
Party name (in Nynorsk)	Number of representatives
Labour Party (Arbeidarpartiet)	3
Local List(s) (Lokale lister)	18
Total number of members:	21

Fitjar heradsstyre 1959–1963
Party name (in Nynorsk)	Number of representatives
Labour Party (Arbeidarpartiet)	1
Local List(s) (Lokale lister)	20
Total number of members:	21

Fitjar heradsstyre 1955–1959
Party name (in Nynorsk)	Number of representatives
Local List(s) (Lokale lister)	21
Total number of members:	21

Fitjar heradsstyre 1951–1955
Party name (in Nynorsk)	Number of representatives
Local List(s) (Lokale lister)	20
Total number of members:	20

Fitjar heradsstyre 1947–1951
Party name (in Nynorsk)	Number of representatives
Labour Party (Arbeidarpartiet)	2
Local List(s) (Lokale lister)	18
Total number of members:	20

Fitjar heradsstyre 1945–1947
Party name (in Nynorsk)	Number of representatives
Labour Party (Arbeidarpartiet)	17
List of workers, fishermen, and small farmholders (Arbeidarar, fiskarar, småbrukarar liste)	3
Local List(s) (Lokale lister)	17
Total number of members:	20

Fitjar heradsstyre 1937–1941*
Party name (in Nynorsk)	Number of representatives
Local List(s) (Lokale lister)	20
Total number of members:	20
Note: Due to the German occupation of Norway during World War II, no elections were held for new municipal councils until after the war ended in 1945.

=== Mayors ===
The mayor (Nynorsk: ordførar) of Fitjar Municipality is the political leader of the municipality and the chairperson of the municipal council. The following people have held this position:

- 1864–1865: Johannes Sørfonden
- 1866–1871: Østen Hageberg
- 1872–1875: Mikkel Sjursen Eide
- 1876–1895: Østen Hageberg (H)
- 1896–1904: Anders Aarbø (H)
- 1905–1913: Mikal Hageberg (H)
- 1913–1913: Tharald Vestbøstad (H)
- 1914–1919: Lars Rydland
- 1920–1925: Peder Rygg
- 1926–1928: Lars Rydland
- 1929–1951: Berje Aarbø (Bp)
- 1952–1955: Harald Henriksen (V)
- 1956–1967: Peder Nilsen Aga (V)
- 1968–1971: Knut L. Rydland (H)
- 1972–1975: Ole Havn (KrF)
- 1976–1977: Knut L. Rydland (H)
- 1978–1979: Finn Havnerås (Ap)
- 1980–1981: Ingebrigt Sørfonn (KrF)
- 1982–1983: Alf Gjøsæter (H)
- 1984–1985: Torvald Ingebrigtsen (Ap)
- 1986–1987: Ingebrigt Sørfonn (KrF)
- 1988–1991: Kjell Nesbø (Ap)
- 1992–1995: Johannes Koløen (H)
- 1995–1998: Per-Gunnar Bukkholm (KrF)
- 1998–1999: Odd Bondevik (Sp)
- 1999–2007: Agnar Aarskog (Ap)
- 2007–2011: Harald Rydland (KrF)
- 2011–2019: Wenche Tislevoll (H)
- 2019–2023: Harald Rydland (KrF)
- 2023–present: Wenche Tislevoll (H)

== Attractions ==
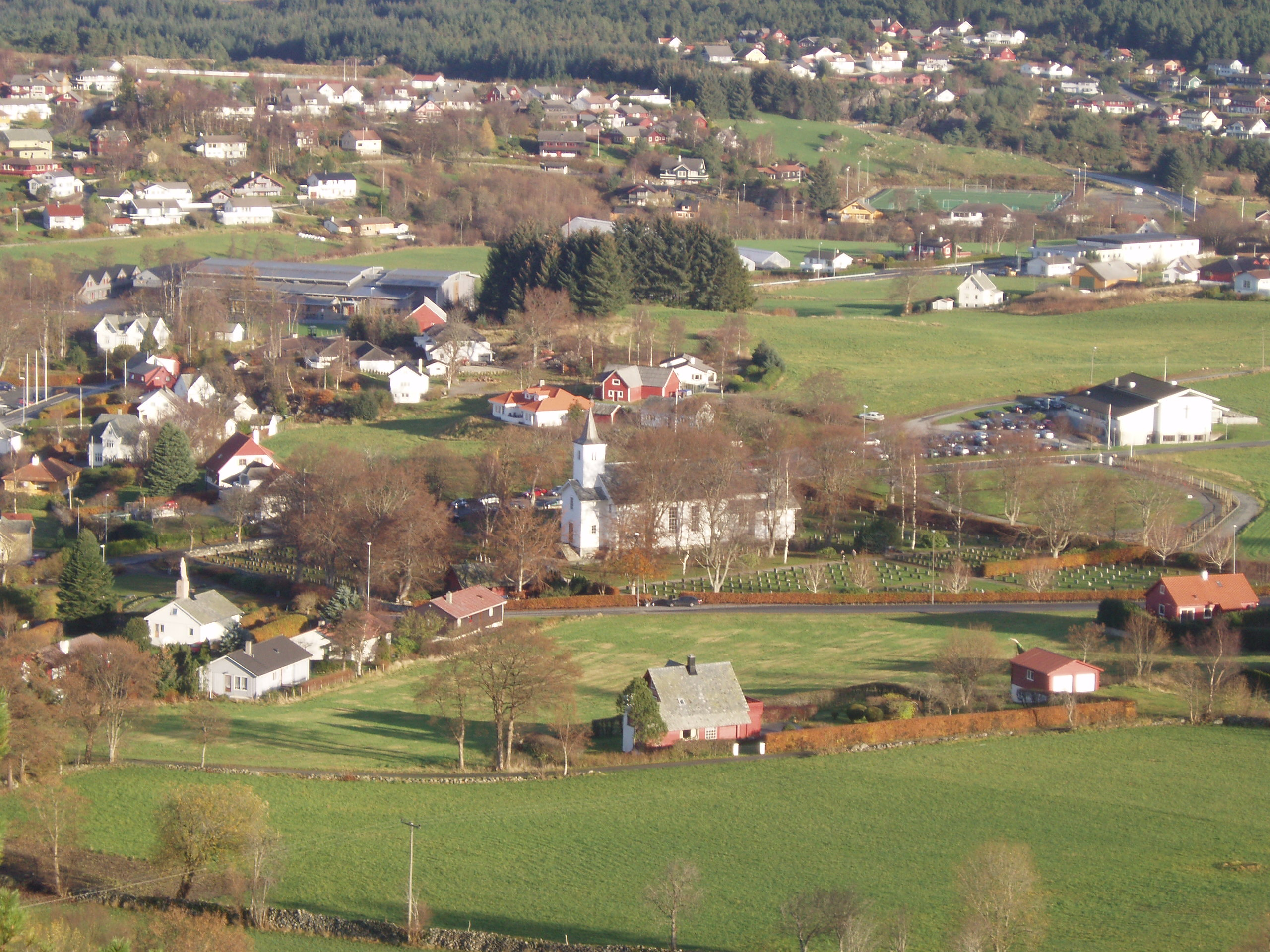
Fitjar Church and Håkonarparken

Fitjar Church was built in 1867 over the site of the old medieval stone church which had been demolished. Stone blocks taken from the old stone church were used as foundations for the present-day church as well as for the walling enclosing the churchyard. Opposite Fitjar Church is Haakon's Park (Håkonarparken), the location of a sculpture of Haakon the Good sculpted by Anne Grimdalen. The statue was erected in 1961 at the one thousand year commemoration of the Battle of Fitjar.

== Notable people ==
- Andreas Fleischer (1878–1957), a theologian, missionary to China, Lutheran Bishop, and priest in Fitjar Church from 1912 to 1917
- Otto Hageberg (1936–2014), a literary historian and academic
