= Mehammarsåta =

Mountain in Vestland, Norway

- Mehamarsåta; Midhamarsåta
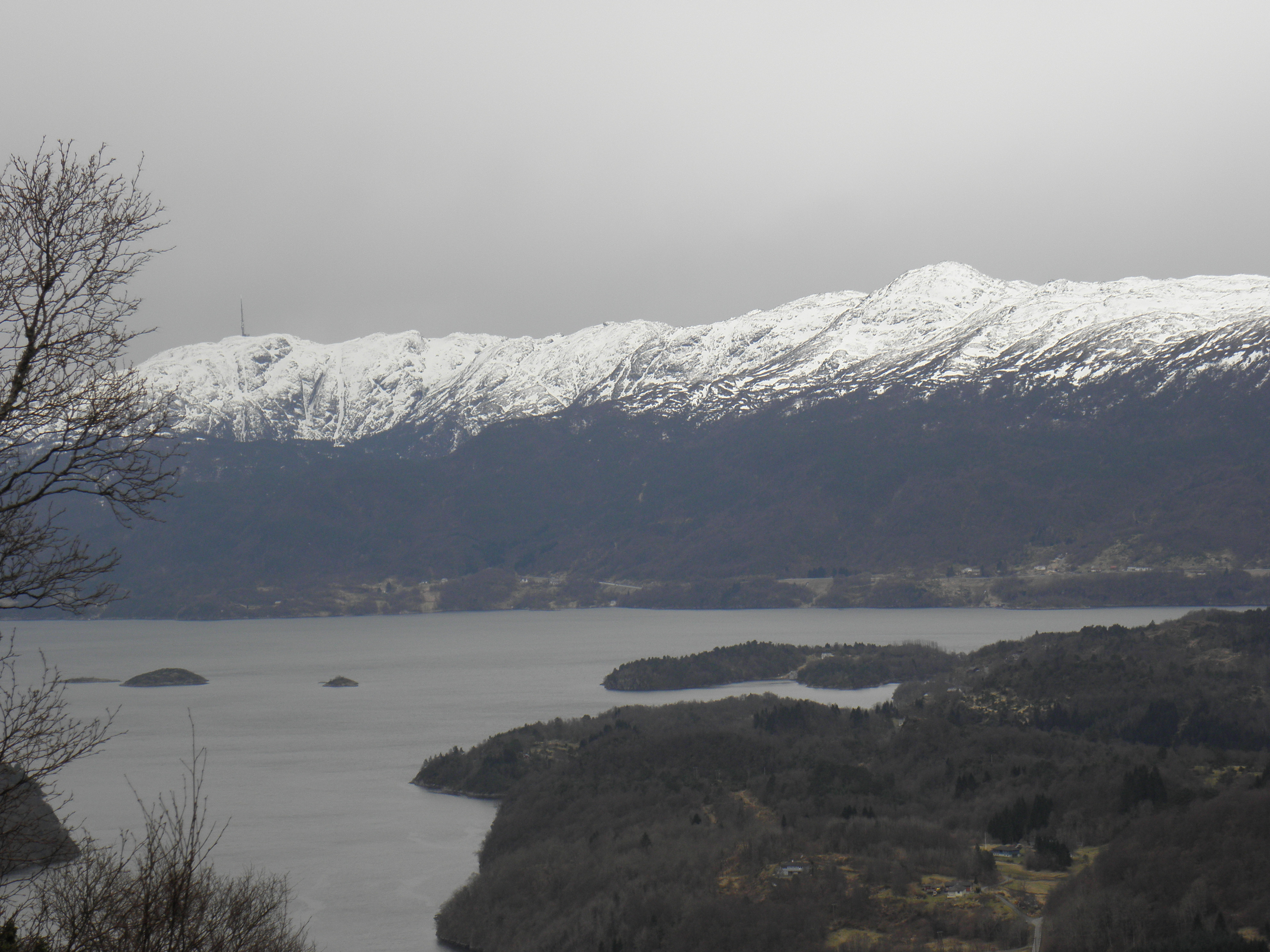
- Mehammarsåta (tallest peak to the right), seen from Tysnesøya

Highest point
- Elevation: 749 m (2,457 ft)
- Prominence: 749 m (2,457 ft)
- Isolation: 16.6 km (10.3 mi)
- Coordinates: 59°53′51″N 5°27′52″E

Geography
- Location: Vestland, Norway

Mehammarsåta is a mountain in Stord Municipality in Vestland county, Norway. The 749-metre (2,457 ft) tall mountain is the highest mountain on the island of Stord. It lies in the northeastern part of the municipality, just south of the border with Fitjar Municipality.

== See also ==
- List of mountains of Norway
