= Moster Church =

Church in Vestland, Norway

- Moster kyrkje
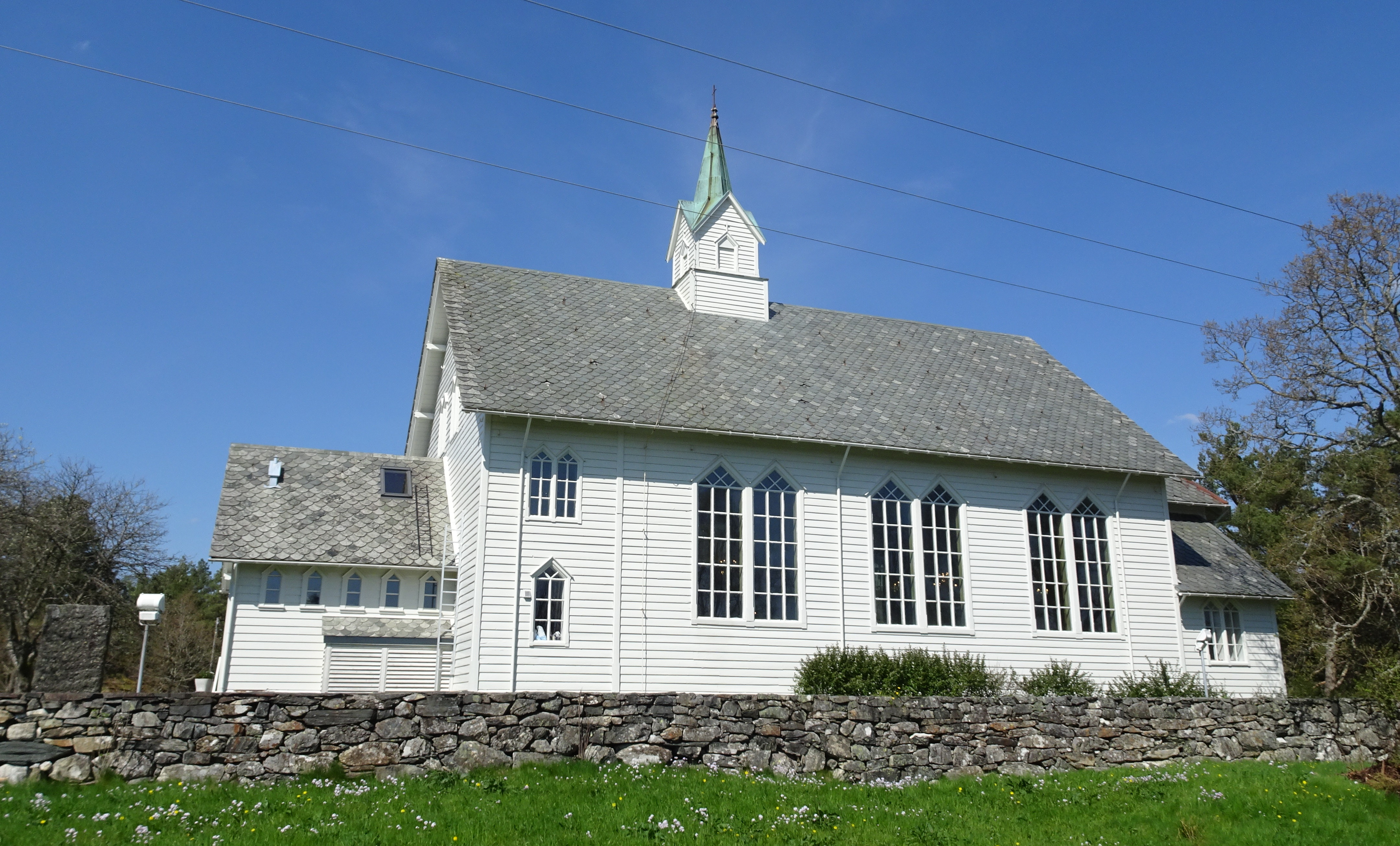
- View of the church
- Moster Church
- 59°43′04″N 5°20′46″E
- Location: Bømlo Municipality, Vestland
- Country: Norway
- Denomination: Church of Norway
- Churchmanship: Evangelical Lutheran

History
- Status: Parish church
- Founded: 1874
- Consecrated: 1874

Architecture
- Functional status: Active
- Architect: Peter Andreas Blix
- Architectural type: Long church
- Completed: 1874 (152 years ago)

Specifications
- Capacity: 365
- Materials: Wood

Administration
- Diocese: Bjørgvin bispedømme
- Deanery: Sunnhordland prosti
- Parish: Moster
- Norwegian Cultural Heritage Site
- Type: Church
- Status: Not protected
- ID: 110013

Moster Church (Norwegian: Moster kyrkje) is a parish church of the Church of Norway in Bømlo Municipality in Vestland county, Norway. It is located just north of the village of Mosterhamn on the island of Moster. It is the church for the Moster parish which is part of the Sunnhordland prosti (deanery) in the Diocese of Bjørgvin. The white, wooden church was built in a long church design in 1874 using plans drawn up by the architect Peter Andreas Blix. The church seats about 365 people. This church was built to replace the centuries-old Old Moster Church.

== History ==
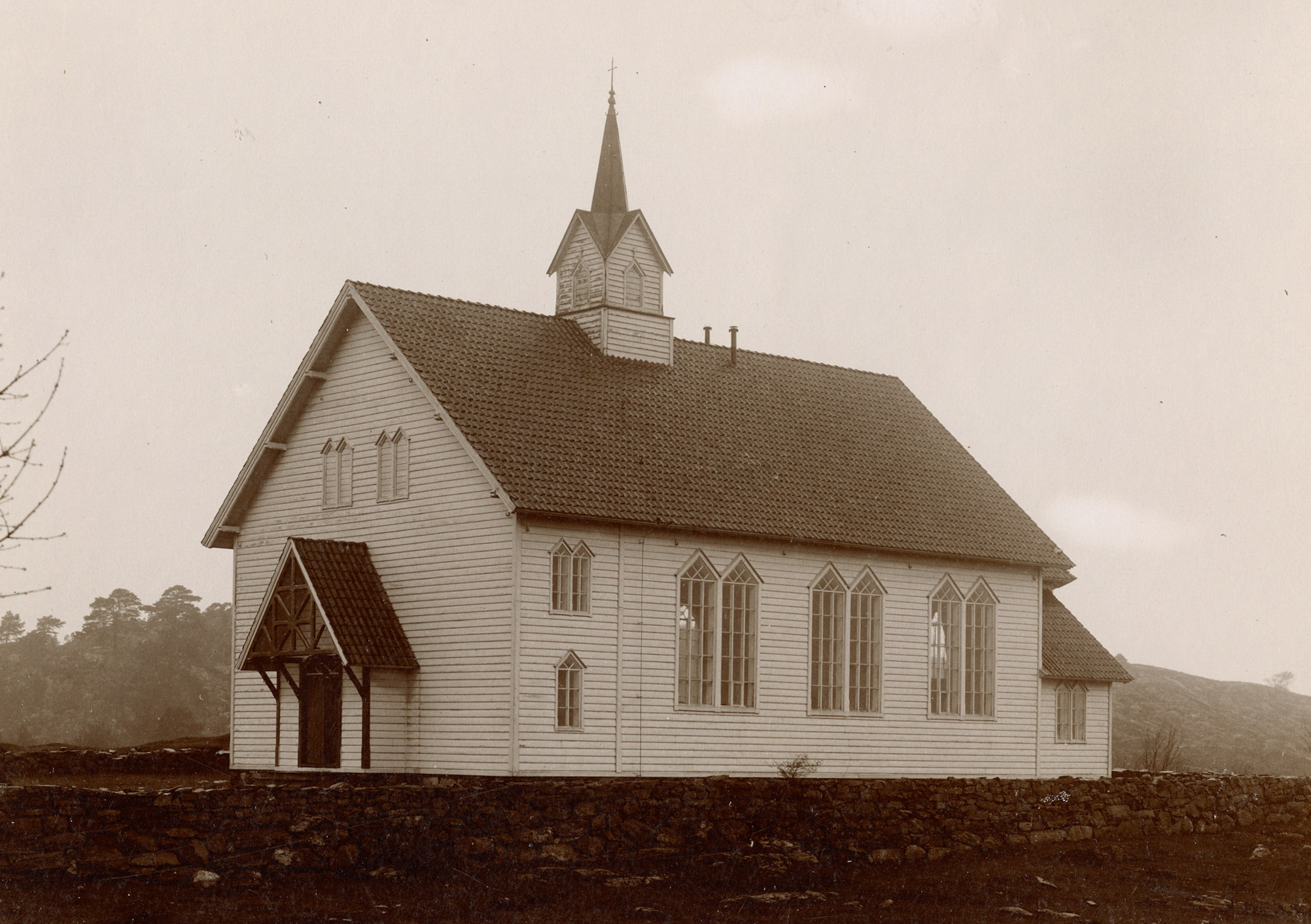
Original look of the church before the new entrance was constructed in 1974.

The Old Moster Church was used to serve the people of Moster for many centuries. By the mid-1800s, it was quite apparent that the old church was too old and small for the congregation. The parish hired Peter Andreas Blix to supply architectural drawings for the church. The new church was completed and consecrated in 1874. In 1974, the old church porch was torn down and replaced with a larger porch. In 1992, a small addition on the north side of the nave was built to provide a wheelchair ramp into the building.

== See also ==
- List of churches in Bjørgvin
