= Sigurd Haakonsson =

Norwegian nobleman

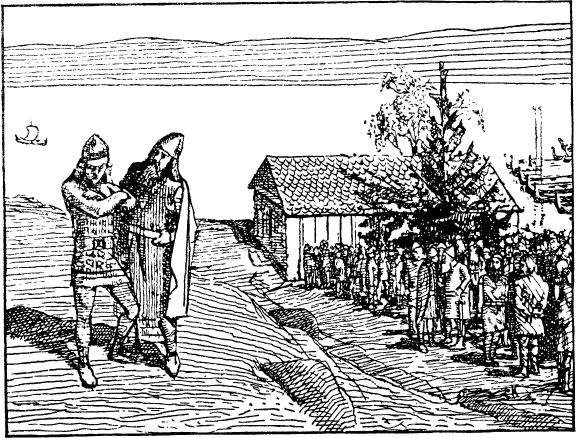
Sigurd Ladejarl with King Haakon the Good, Drawing by Christian Krohg, 1899

Sigurd Håkonsson (died 962) (Old Norse: Sigurðr Hákonarson) was a Norwegian nobleman and Jarl of Lade in Trøndelag.

Sigurd had Kormákr Ögmundarson as a court poet. Fragments of Kormákr's lay on Sigurd Håkonsson, Sigurðardrápa, are preserved in Skáldskaparmál and in Heimskringla.
