= Old Moster Church =

Church in Vestland, Norway

- Moster gamle kyrkje
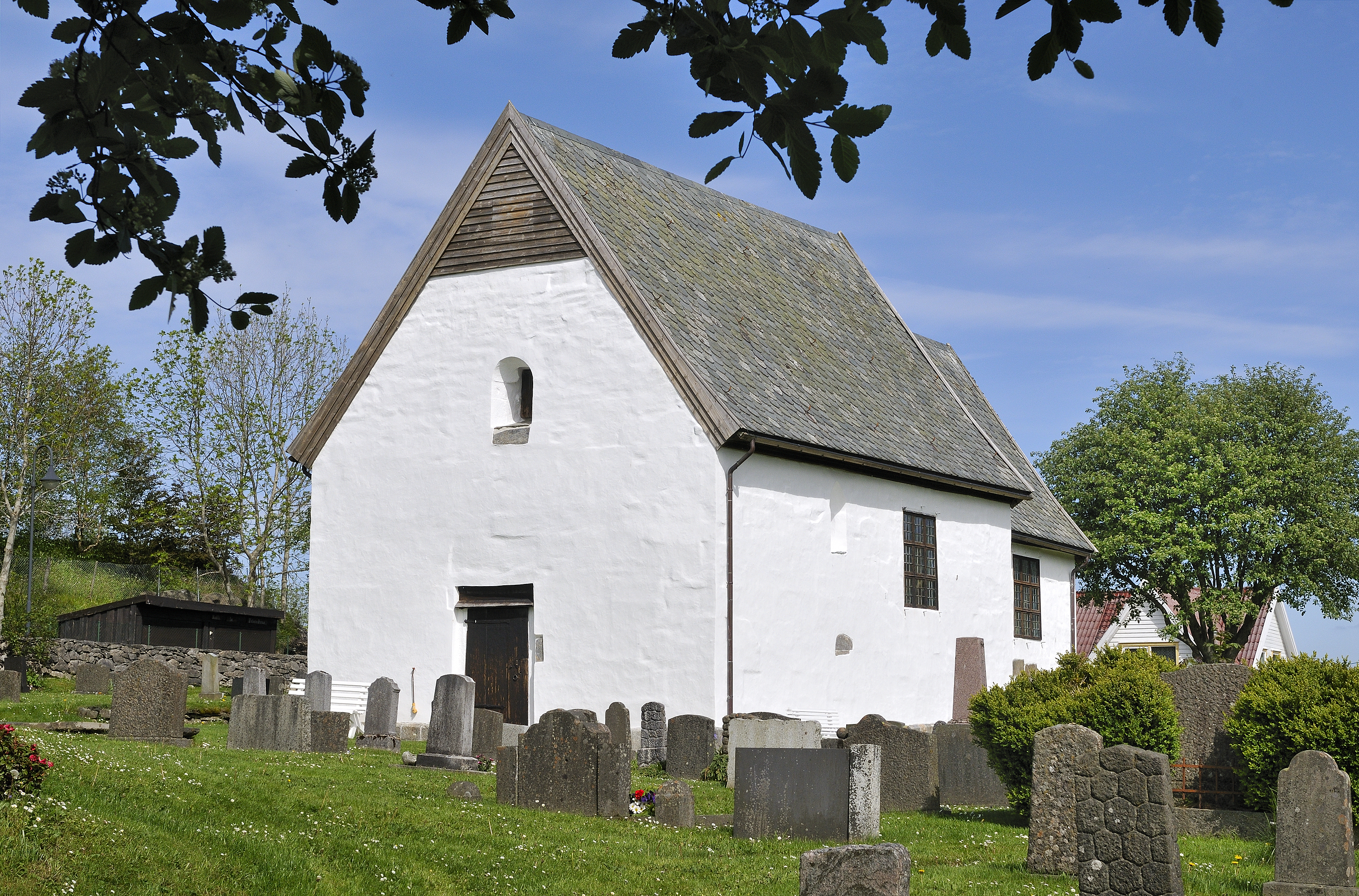
- View of the church
- Old Moster Church
- 59°42′06″N 5°22′55″E
- Location: Bømlo Municipality, Vestland
- Country: Norway
- Denomination: Church of Norway
- Previous denomination: Catholic Church
- Churchmanship: Evangelical Lutheran

History
- Status: Parish church
- Founded: c. 996
- Consecrated: c. 1150

Architecture
- Functional status: Active
- Architectural type: Long church
- Completed: c. 1150 (876 years ago)

Specifications
- Capacity: 80
- Materials: Stone

Administration
- Diocese: Bjørgvin bispedømme
- Deanery: Sunnhordland prosti
- Parish: Moster
- Norwegian Cultural Heritage Site
- Type: Church
- Status: Automatically protected
- ID: 84979

Old Moster Church (Norwegian: Moster gamle kyrkje) is a parish church of the Church of Norway in Bømlo Municipality in Vestland county, Norway, and it is one of the oldest churches in all of Norway. It is located in the village of Mosterhamn on the island of Moster. It used to be the main church for the Moster parish which is part of the Sunnhordland prosti (deanery) in the Diocese of Bjørgvin. The white stone church was built in a long church design in the 12th century using plans drawn up by an unknown architect. The church seats about 80 people.

== History ==
The Old Moster Church has a long and important history in Norway. According to tradition and the historian Snorri Sturluson, Norwegian King Olav Tryggvason built a church at Mosterhamn in the year 996 when Christianity was first introduced to Norway. Around the year 1024, the King Olaf II of Norway (later Saint Olaf) held a thing at Moster where the oldest Christian law was introduced in Norway, converting the kingdom to Christianity. The first church in Moster was possibly a wooden post church. Nothing is known about the old church.

During the 12th century, the old church was torn down and a new stone church was built on the same site. The wall openings have Romanesque features, and the masonry is somewhat ancient in places, so archaeologists and historians believe the church was probably started around the year 1100 and completed around 1150. The church was built as a long church with a rectangular nave and a narrower, rectangular chancel.

In 1814, this church served as an election church (Norwegian: valgkirke). Together with more than 300 other parish churches across Norway, it was a polling station for elections to the 1814 Norwegian Constituent Assembly which wrote the Constitution of Norway. This was Norway's first national elections. Each church parish was a constituency that elected people called "electors" who later met together in each county to elect the representatives for the assembly that was to meet at Eidsvoll Manor later that year.

The old church only seated about 80 people, so by the mid-19th century, the church had become too small for the congregation, so a new Moster Church was built nearby in 1874. After the new church opened, this church was scheduled to be torn down, but the Society for the Preservation of Ancient Norwegian Monuments purchased it and then turned into a museum. It was restored by Peter Andreas Blix in 1896 to look like it historically did. The church is no longer used by the parish for regular worship, but it is still consecrated for use and so it is rarely used for special occasions.

== Design ==
The church has a square, 5.9-by-6-metre (19 ft × 20 ft) choir and a rectangular, 12.4-by-8.1-metre (41 ft × 27 ft) nave and with an entrance in the western wall of the nave and one in the southern wall of the choir. The roof structures were replaced in the 18th century. The church is mainly built of soapstone from a quarry near the village of Lykling.

== Media gallery ==
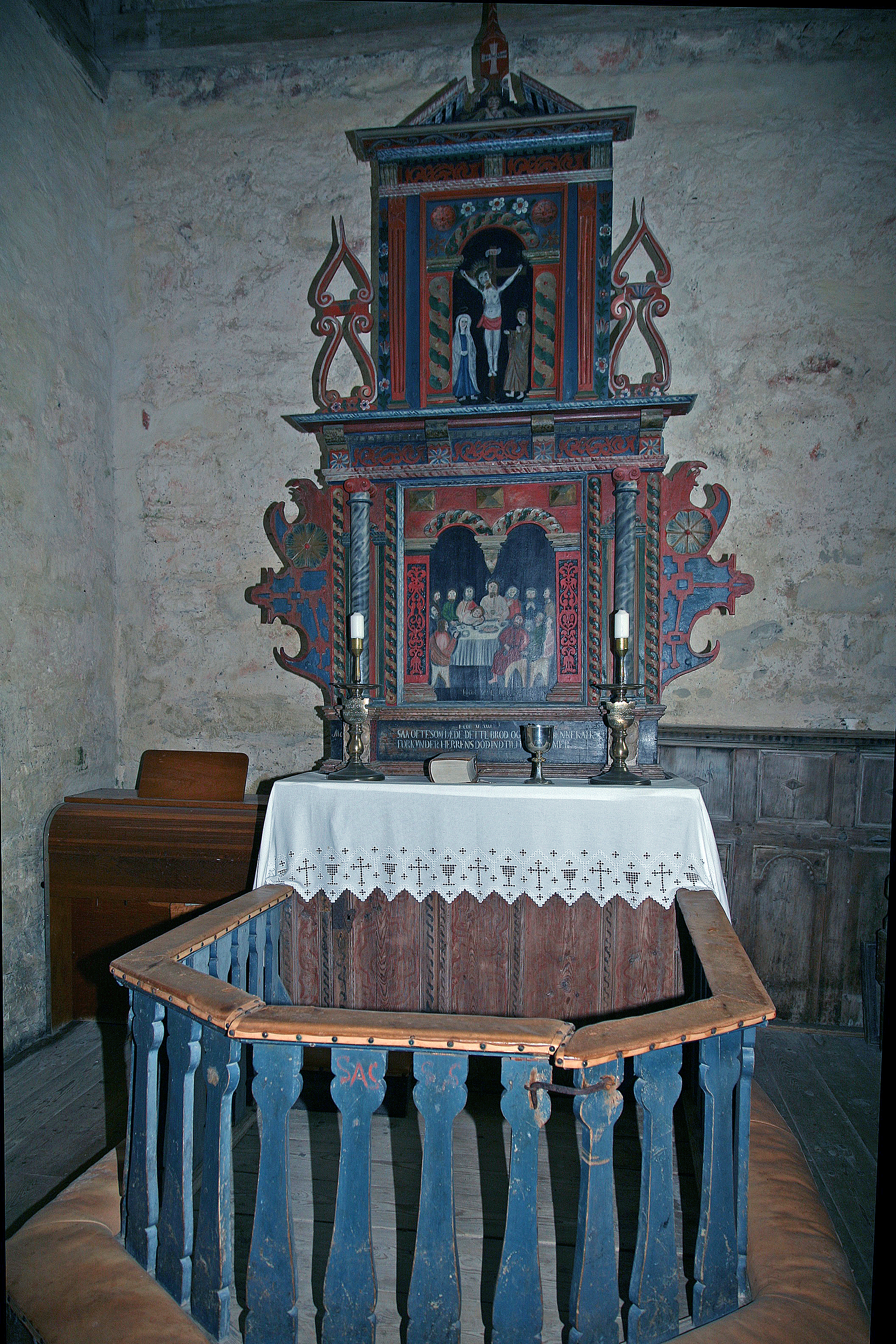
Altarpiece

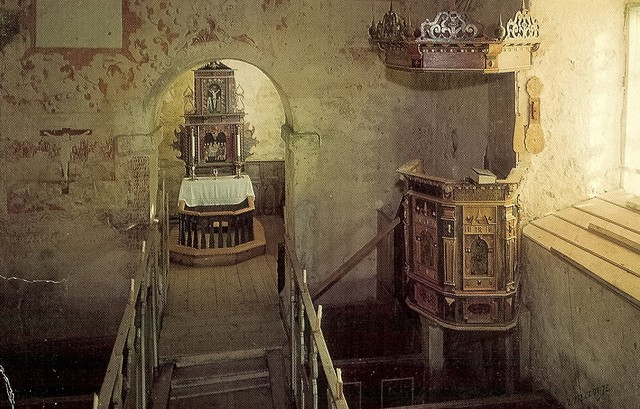
Interior

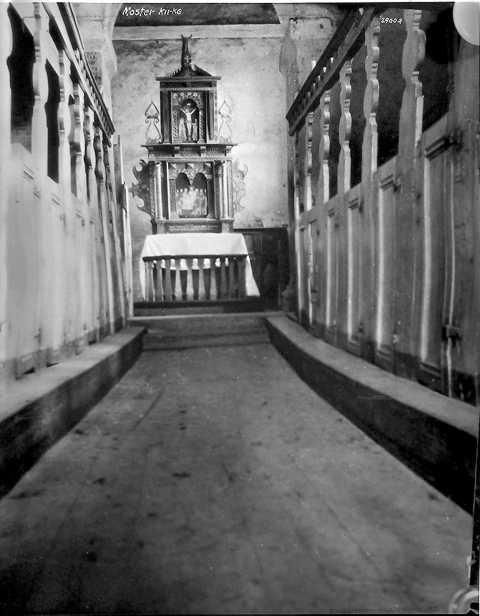
Interior

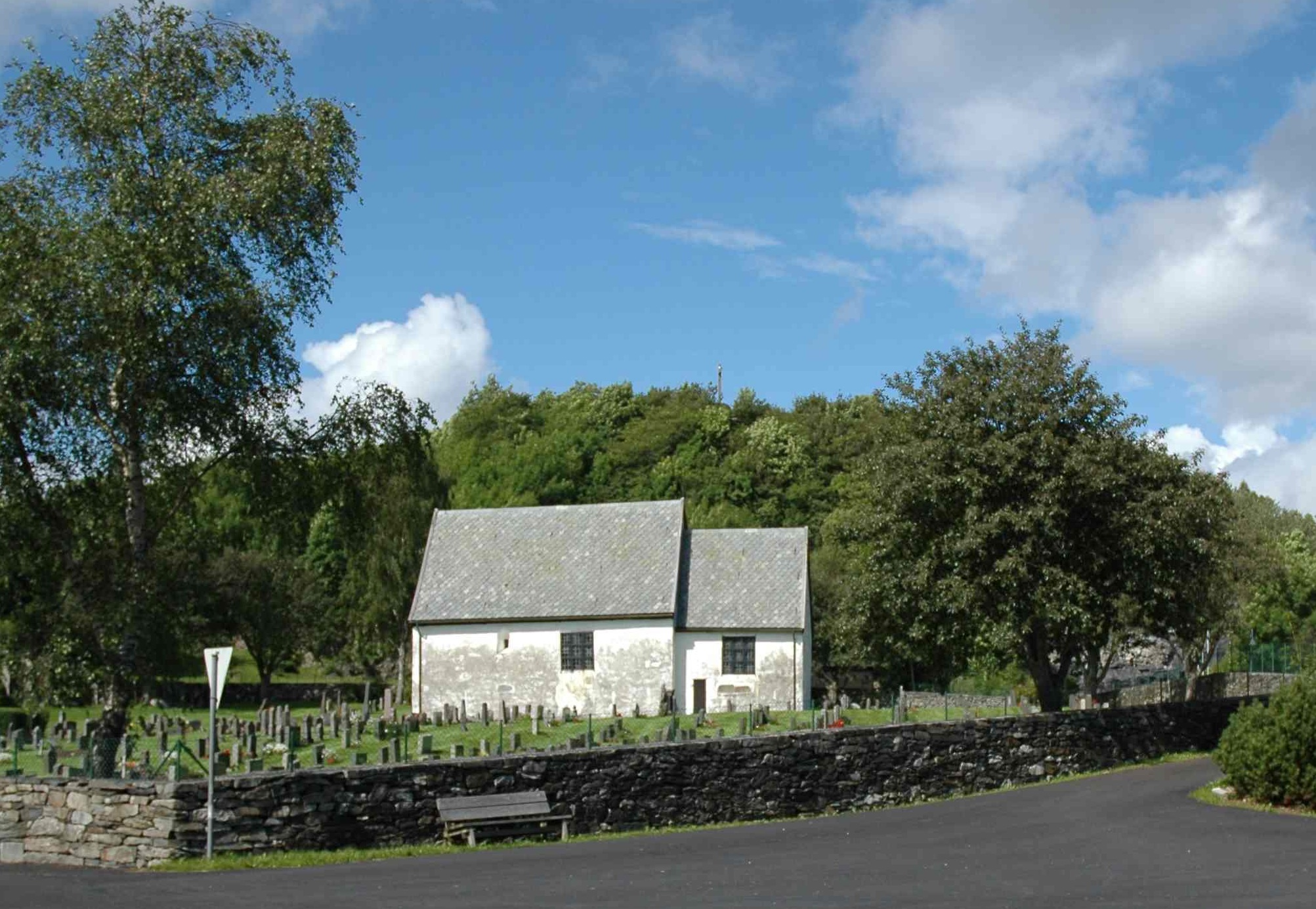
Exterior

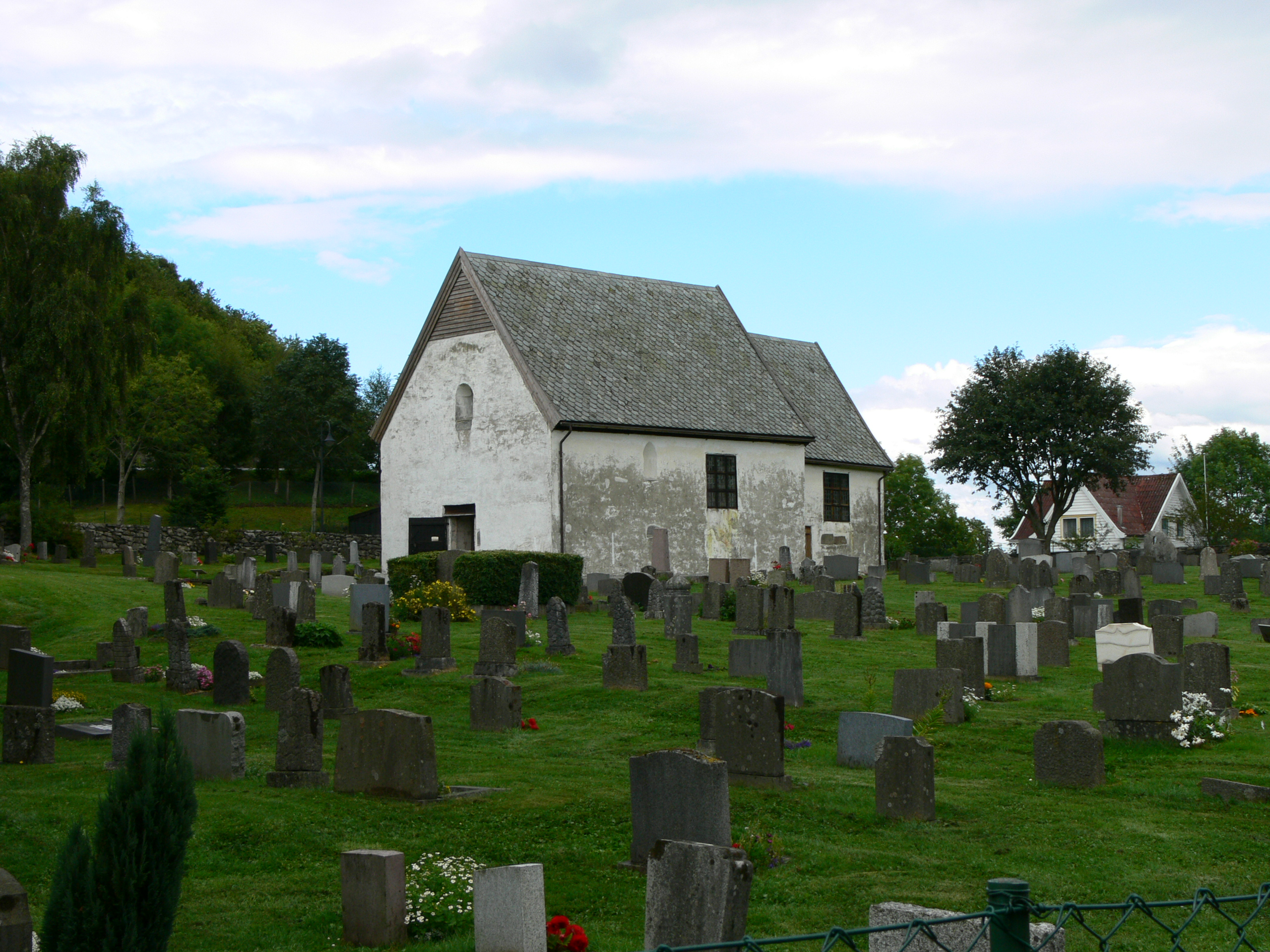
Exterior

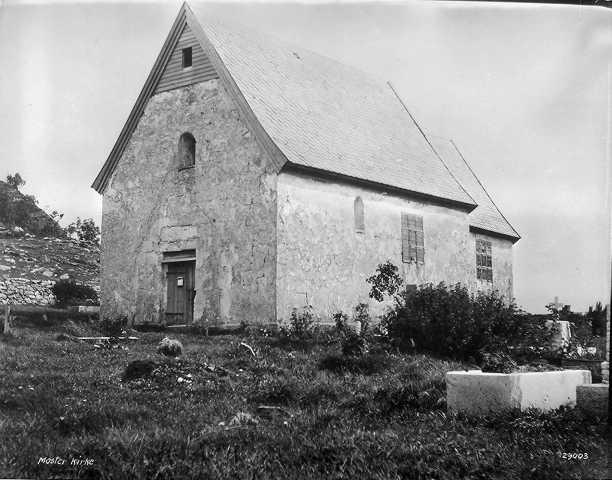
Exterior (from 1926)

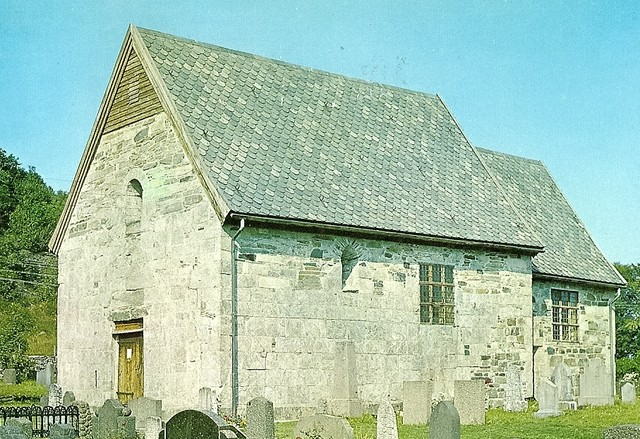
Exterior

== See also ==
- List of churches in Bjørgvin
