= Fitjar Church =

Church in Vestland, Norway

- Fitjar kyrkje
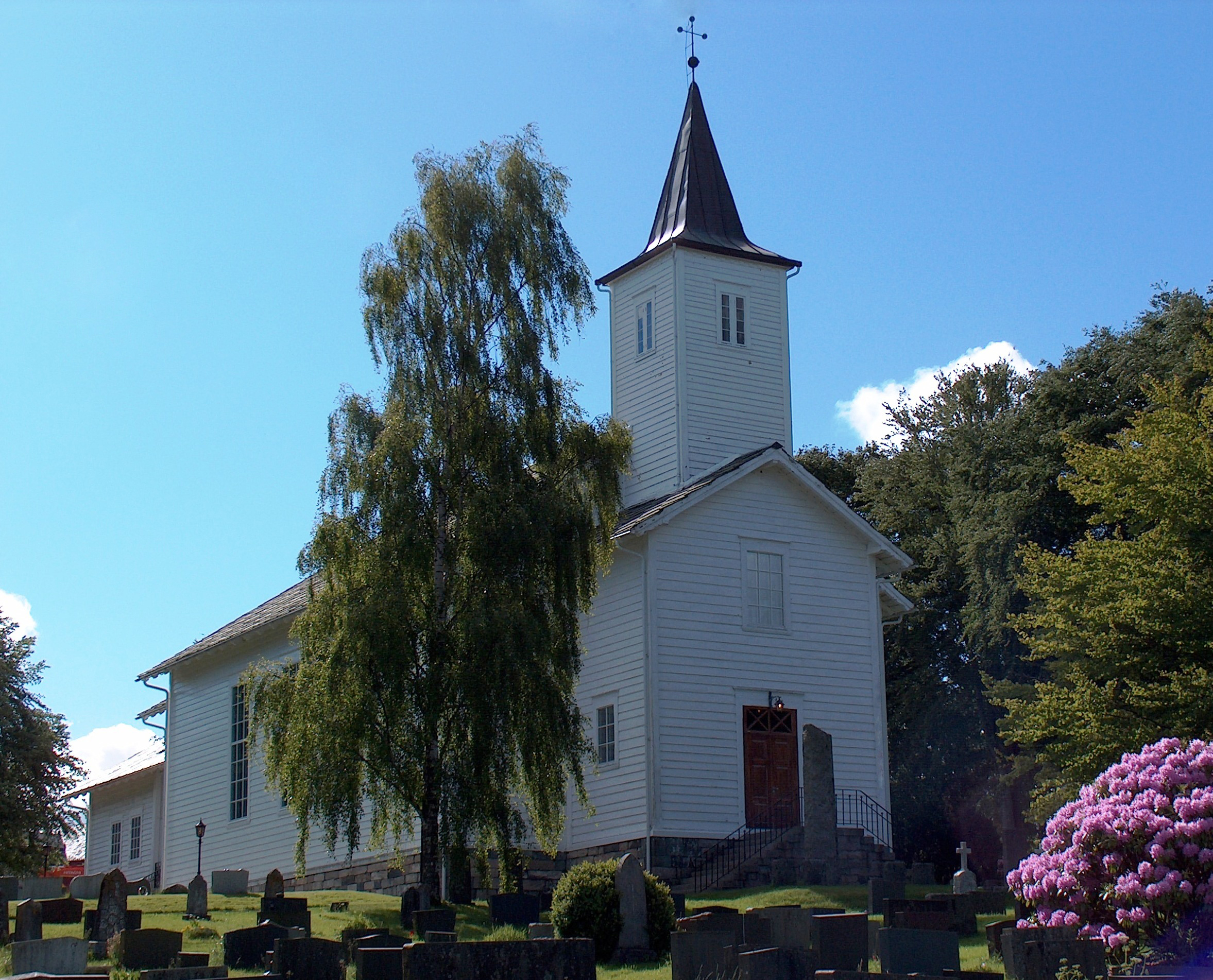
- View of the church
- Fitjar Church
- 59°55′02″N 5°19′09″E
- Location: Fitjar Municipality, Vestland
- Country: Norway
- Denomination: Church of Norway
- Previous denomination: Catholic Church
- Churchmanship: Evangelical Lutheran

History
- Status: Parish church
- Founded: 10th century
- Consecrated: 1867

Architecture
- Functional status: Active
- Architect: John O. Kaarhus
- Architectural type: Long church
- Completed: 1867 (159 years ago)

Specifications
- Capacity: 425
- Materials: Wood

Administration
- Diocese: Bjørgvin bispedømme
- Deanery: Sunnhordland prosti
- Parish: Fitjar
- Norwegian Cultural Heritage Site
- Type: Church
- Status: Listed
- ID: 84143

Fitjar Church (Norwegian: Fitjar kyrkje) is a parish church of the Church of Norway in Fitjar Municipality in Vestland county, Norway. It is located in the village of Fitjar. It is the church for the Fitjar parish which is part of the Sunnhordland prosti (deanery) in the Diocese of Bjørgvin. The white, wooden church was built in a long church design in 1867 using plans drawn up by the architect John O. Kaarhus from Skånevik. The church seats about 425 people.

== History ==
The first church in Fitjar was probably a wooden post church that was built in the 10th century on a site about 40 metres (130 ft) north of the present church site. A wooden coffin was discovered near the present church in 1997 that was dated to the 10th century, so it is likely the church was in existence at that time. During the early 12th century, a new stone church was built at Fitjar. This stone building was built around the same time as the Old Moster Church was built since the two churches have similar designs. The new church was built of stone and it probably did not have a steeple. The main part of the church was approximately 14.4 by 10.7 metres (47 ft × 35 ft) with a rectangular nave that measured 14.4 by 10.7 metres (47 ft × 35 ft) and a smaller chancel that measured 6.9 by 8.5 metres (23 ft × 28 ft). The walls of the church were approximately 1.5 metres (4 ft 11 in) thick.

Prior to 1862, Fitjar Church was an annex to the large parish of Stord. In 1862, Fitjar was split off to form its own parish. At that time, it was decided that the old church was too small for the new parish so a new church would be built. In 1867, the old church was torn down and a new wooden church was built about 40 metres (130 ft) to the south of the old stone church. The new wooden long church had a nave that is approximately 19 by 12.7 metres (62 ft × 42 ft) and the choir is about 5.3 by 7.1 metres (17 ft × 23 ft). On the east end of the choir lies a sacristy and on the west end of the nave is a church porch with a tower above it. Stone from the old church was used in building the foundation for the new church. There were also many items from the old church that were kept and are still used in the new church including the old altarpiece, some brass candlesticks, and the baptismal font. The interior of the church was remodeled using plans drawn up by Einar Vaardal-Lunde in 1957. In 1985, the sacristy in the east was enlarged.

== Media gallery ==
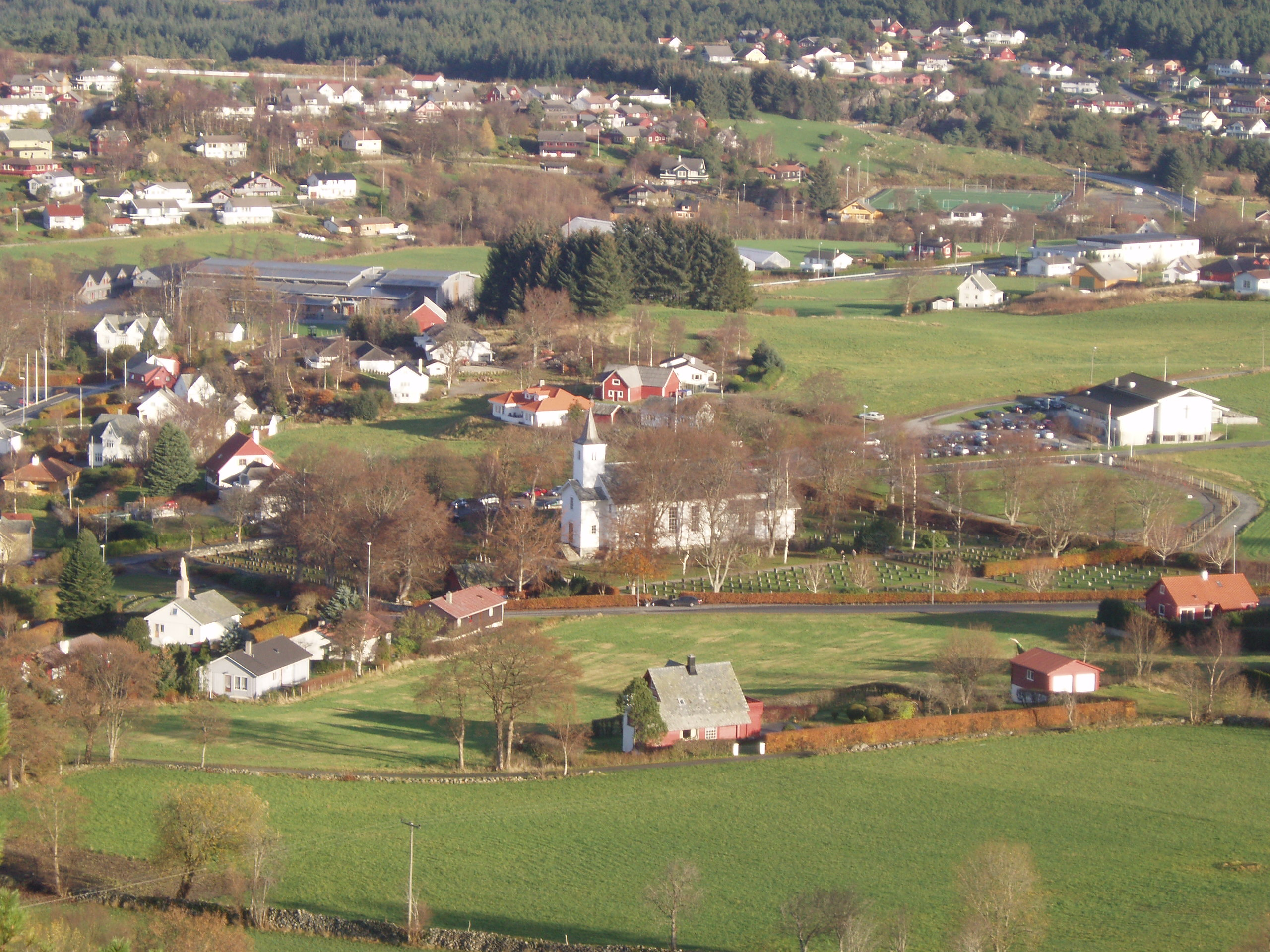

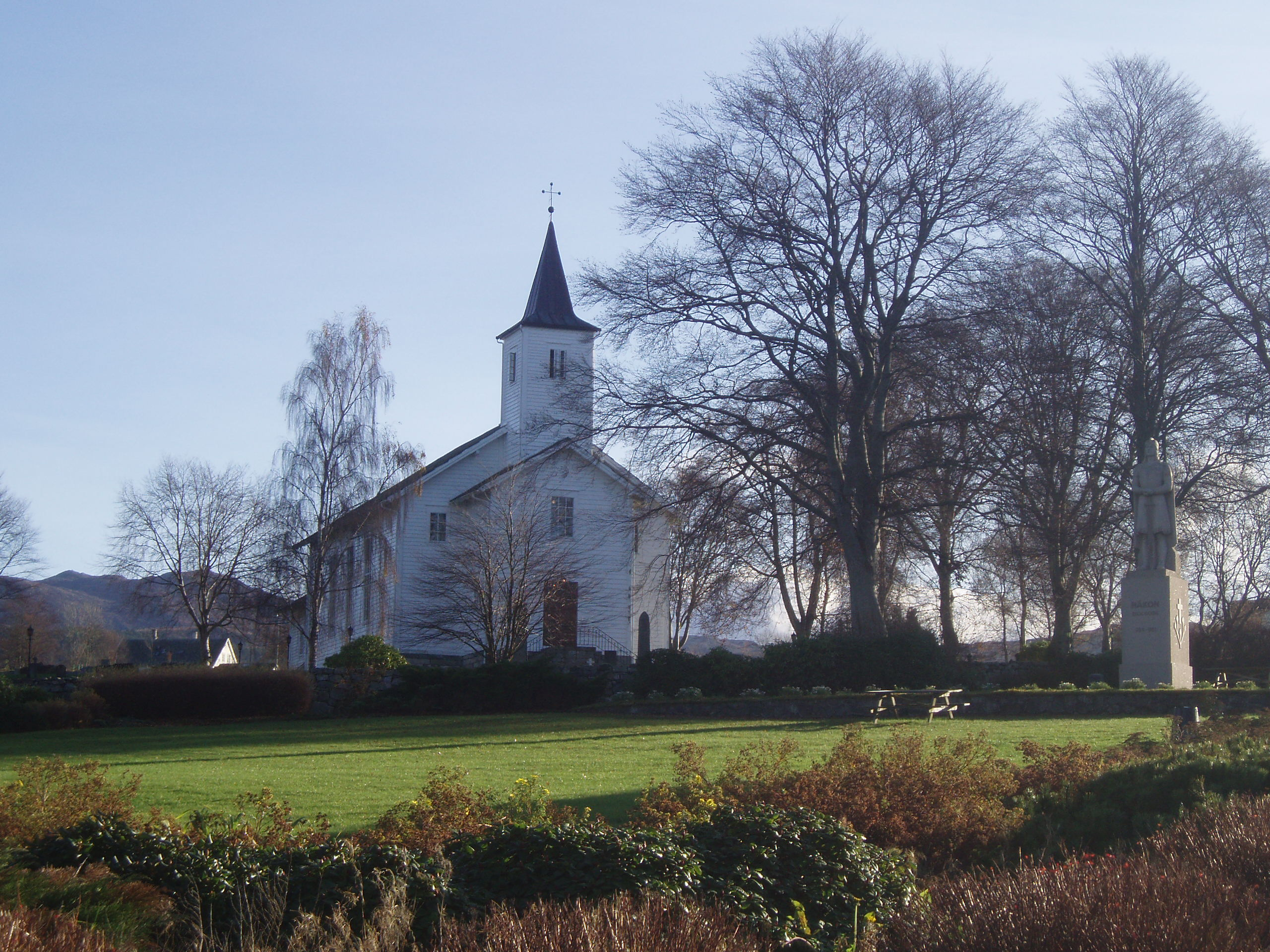

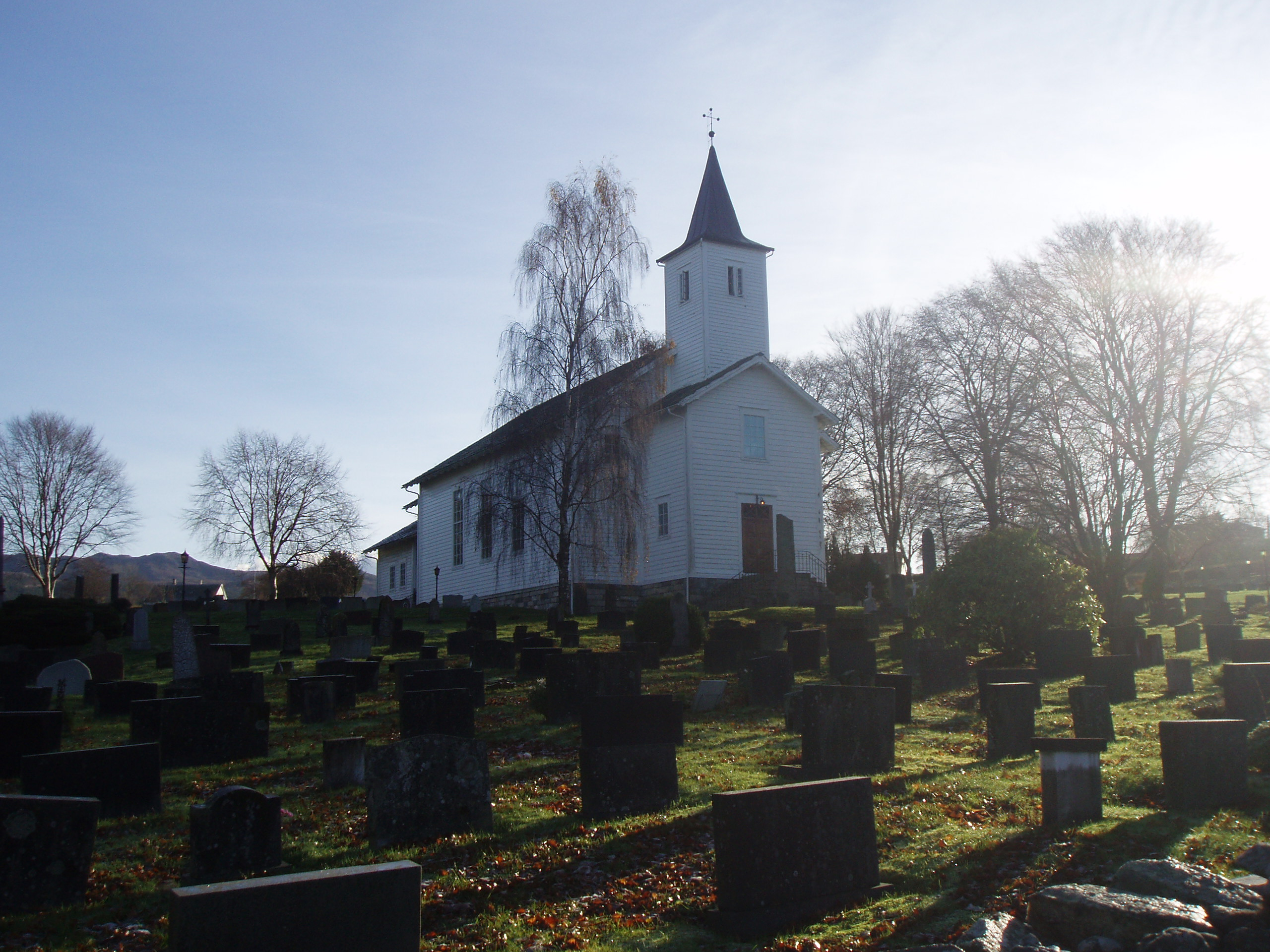

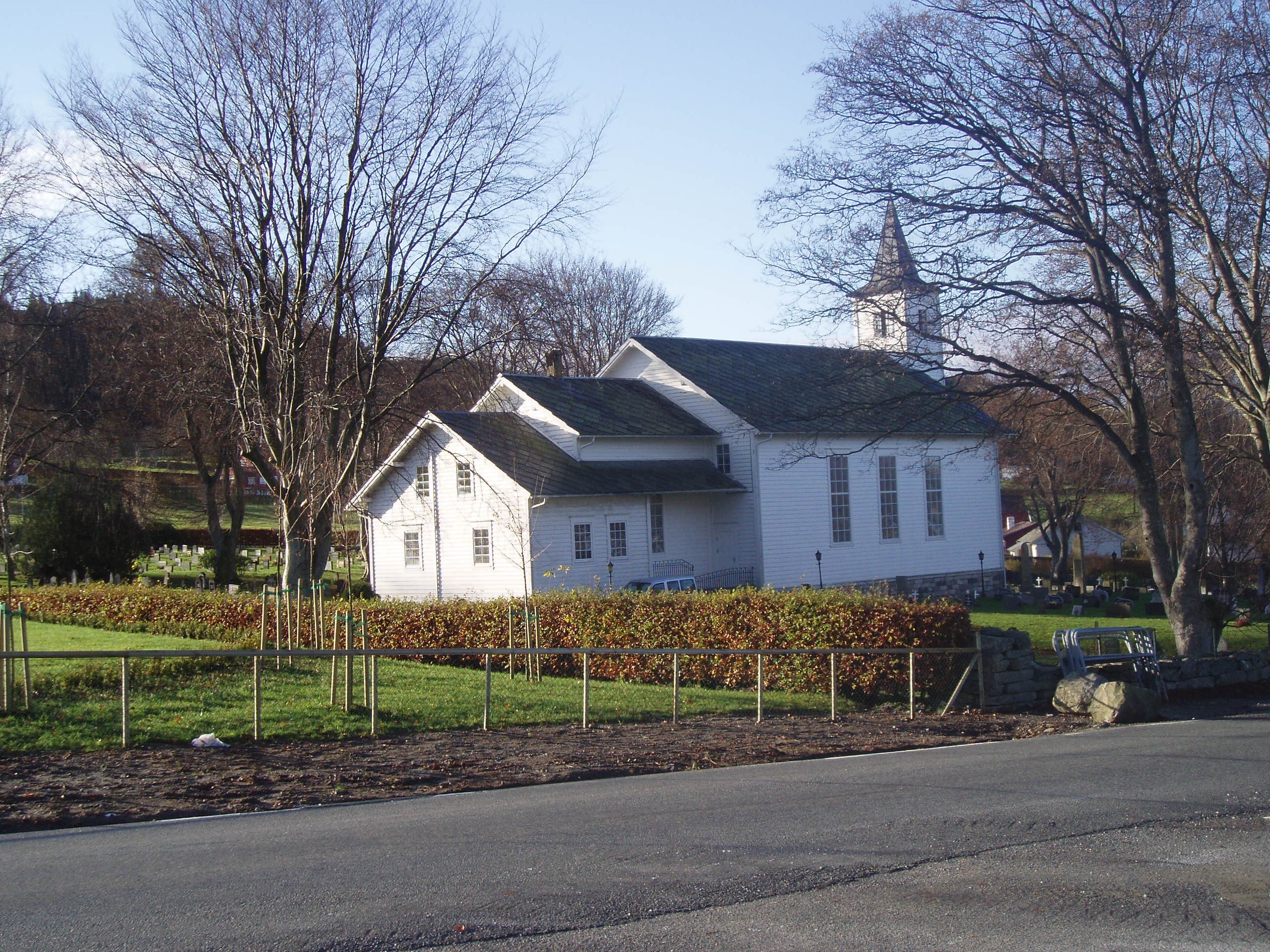

== See also ==
- List of churches in Bjørgvin
