= Mosterhamn =

Village in Bømlo Municipality, Norway

Mosterhamn Moster
- Village
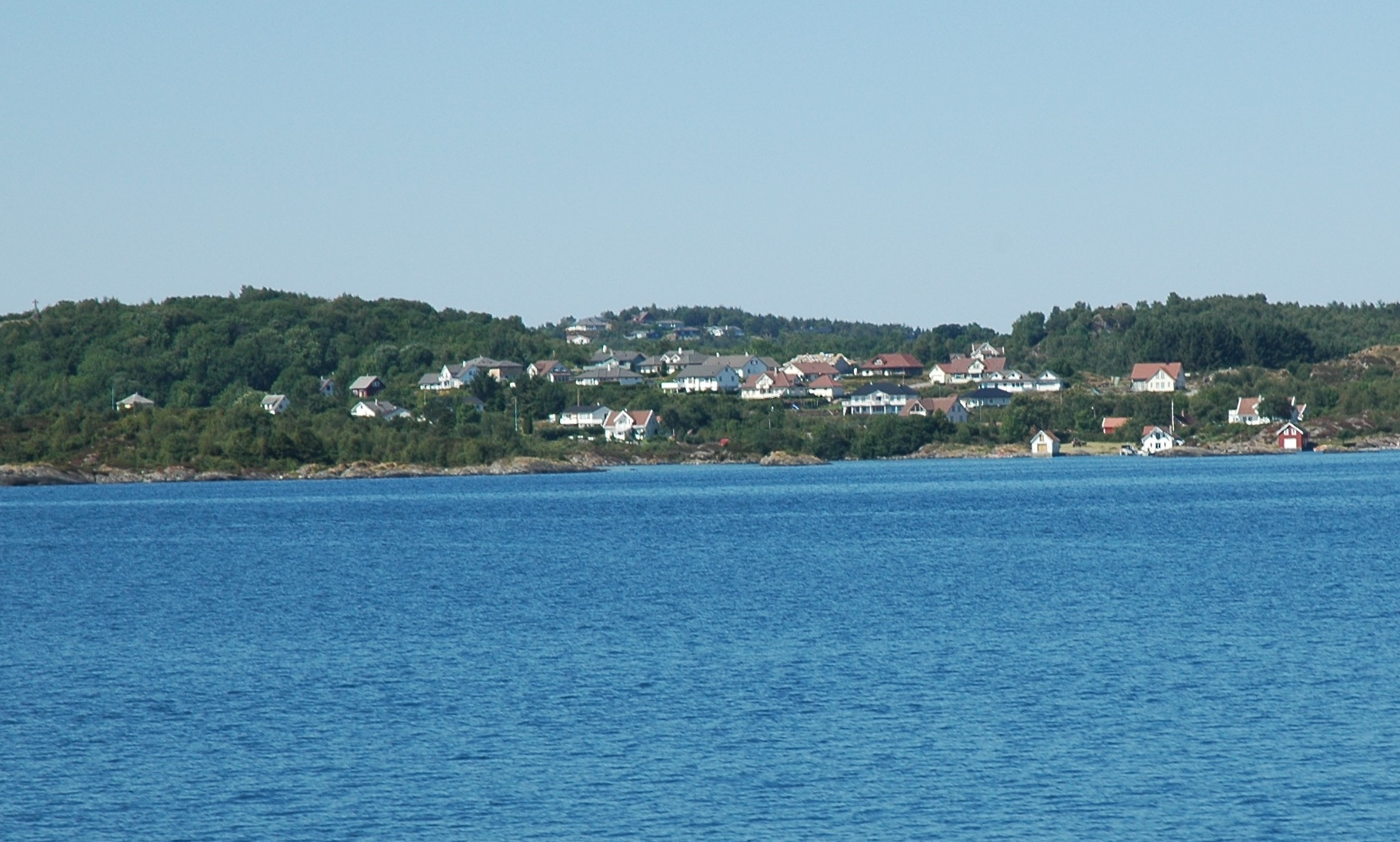
- View of the village
- Interactive map of Mosterhamn; Moster
- Coordinates: 59.69919°N 5.38585°E
- Country: Norway
- Region: Western Norway
- County: Vestland
- District: Sunnhordland
- Municipality: Bømlo Municipality

Area
  - Total: 1.83 km^{2} (0.71 sq mi)
- Elevation: 1 m (3.3 ft)

Population (2025)
  - Total: 1,431
  - Density: 782/km^{2} (2,030/sq mi)
- Time zone: UTC+01:00 (CET)
  - Summer (DST): UTC+02:00 (CEST)
- Post Code: 5440 Mosterhamn

Mosterhamn or simply Moster is a village in Bømlo Municipality in Vestland county, Norway. The village is located on the small island of Moster in the southeastern part of Bømlo Municipality. The village lies along the Bømlafjorden. The 1.83-square-kilometre (450-acre) village has a population (2025) of 1,431 and a population density of 782 inhabitants per square kilometre (2,030/sq mi).

The village is notable since the Old Moster Church is here and that is the site of the Mostratinget, a thing in the year 998 when Olav Tryggvason is said to have brought Christianity to Norway and made it the national Church of Norway.

Prior to the opening of the Triangle Link bridge-tunnel network in 2001, Mosterhamn was one port of the Mosterhamn–Valevåg Ferry which crossed the Bømlafjorden.
