= Moster (island) =

Island in Vestland, Norway

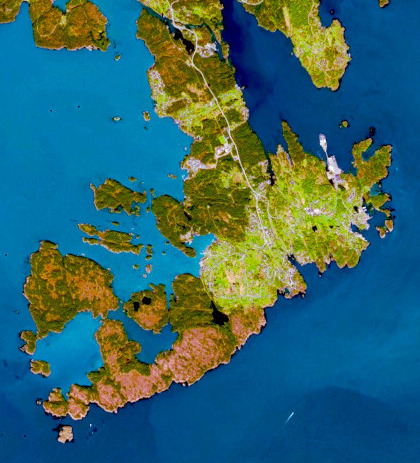
- View of the island by Sentinel-2
- Interactive map of the island

Geography
- Location: Vestland, Norway
- Coordinates: 59.70551°N 5.3575°E
- Area: 12 km^{2} (4.6 sq mi)
- Length: 5.2 km (3.23 mi)
- Width: 6.8 km (4.23 mi)

Administration
- Norway
- County: Vestland
- Municipality: Bømlo Municipality

Moster is an island in Bømlo Municipality in Vestland county, Norway. The 12-square-kilometre (4.6 sq mi) island lies just south of the large island of Bømlo, surrounded by the Bømlafjorden. The Røyksund Channel is a small navigable channel that separates Moster from the island of Bømlo. There is one bridge on the Norwegian County Road 542 that crosses the channel, connecting the island to the rest of the municipality, which in turn is connected to the mainland via the Triangle Link.

The island is the location of the village of Mosterhamn. The thousand-year old Old Moster Church is located in Mosterhamn, and the newer Moster Church is also located on the island. The Mostrating was a thing that was held in Moster in 1024 by King Olav II and Bishop Grimketel. This is considered the meeting that made Christianity the national religion of Norway.

== See also ==
- List of islands of Norway
