= Fitjar (village) =

Village in Fitjar Municipality, Norway

- Village
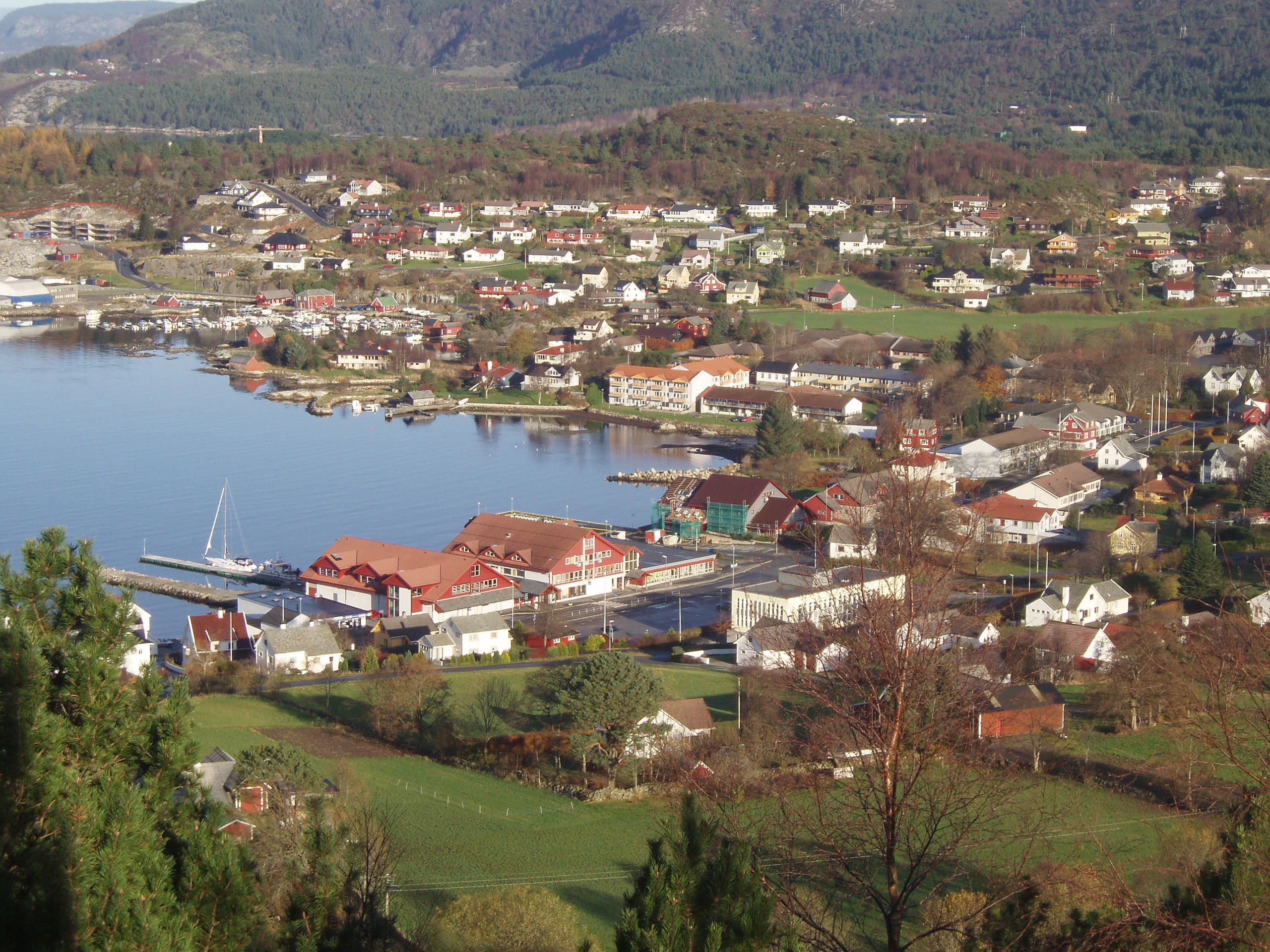
- View of the village
- Interactive map of Fitjar
- Coordinates: 59.91803°N 5.31674°E
- Country: Norway
- Region: Western Norway
- County: Vestland
- District: Sunnhordland
- Municipality: Fitjar Municipality

Area
  - Total: 1.61 km^{2} (0.62 sq mi)
- Elevation: 3 m (9.8 ft)

Population (2025)
  - Total: 1,826
  - Density: 1,134/km^{2} (2,940/sq mi)
- Time zone: UTC+01:00 (CET)
  - Summer (DST): UTC+02:00 (CEST)
- Post Code: 5419 Fitjar

Fitjar is the administrative centre of Fitjar Municipality in Vestland county, Norway. The village is located on the northwestern shore of the island of Stord. It sits at the southern end of the Fitjarvika bay, a small arm off the main Selbjørnsfjorden. A large group of small islands lie just off the coast to the west. Fitjar Church is located in this central part of this village. The historic Battle of Fitjar took place in this area in the year 961.

The 1.61-square-kilometre (400-acre) village has a population (2025) of 1,826 and a population density of 1,134 inhabitants per square kilometre (2,940/sq mi).

== Name ==
The village (and municipality) is named after the old Fitjar farm, since the first Fitjar Church was built there. The name is the indefinite plural form of fit which means "meadowland on the banks of a lake or river". Before 1900, the name was spelled "Fitje".
