= Bergen Peninsula =

Peninsula in Norway

Bergen Peninsula Bergenshalvøyen (Norwegian)
- Peninsula
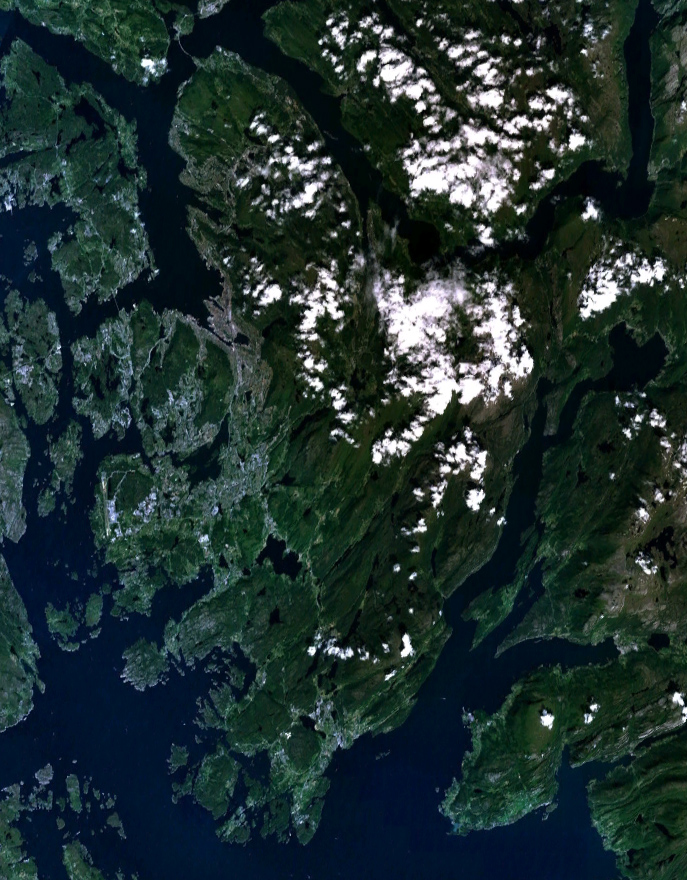
- Satellite image of the peninsula
- Interactive map of Bergen Peninsula
- Coordinates: 60.33333°N 5.41667°E
- Location: Vestland, Norway

The Bergen Peninsula (Bokmål: Bergenshalvøyen; Nynorsk: Bergenshalvøya, Urban East Norwegian: [ˈbæ̀rɡn̩sˌhɑɫːœʏɑ]) is a peninsula in Vestland county, Norway. The city of Bergen, Norway's second largest city, is located on the peninsula. The peninsula extends out from the mainland and it is surrounded by the following fjords: Samnangerfjorden, Bjørnafjorden, Fusafjorden, Raunefjorden, Byfjorden, Salhusfjorden, Sørfjorden. The peninsula is connected to the rest of mainland Norway by a narrow, 6.5-kilometre (4.0 mi) wide strip of land between the villages of Trengereid and Årland. The highest point is the 987-metre (3,238 ft) tall mountain Gullfjellet.

The peninsula is shared by three municipalities:

- all of Bergen Municipality (465 square kilometres; 180 sq mi)
- part of Bjørnafjorden Municipality (140 square kilometres; 54 sq mi)
- part of Samnanger Municipality (50 square kilometres; 19 sq mi)

== Geography ==
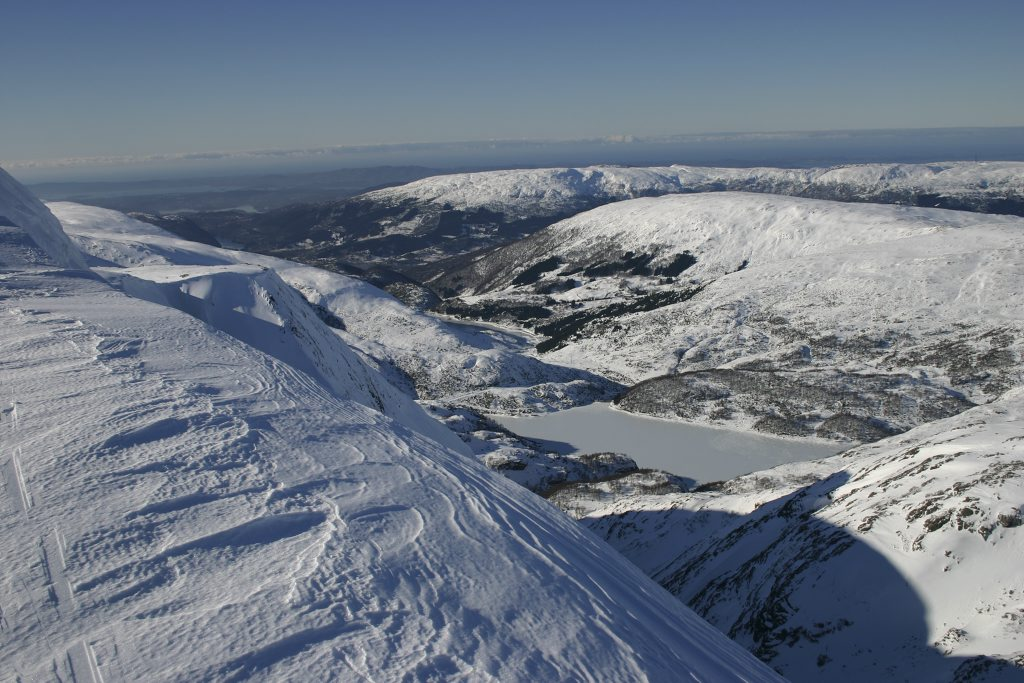
View from Gullfjellet.

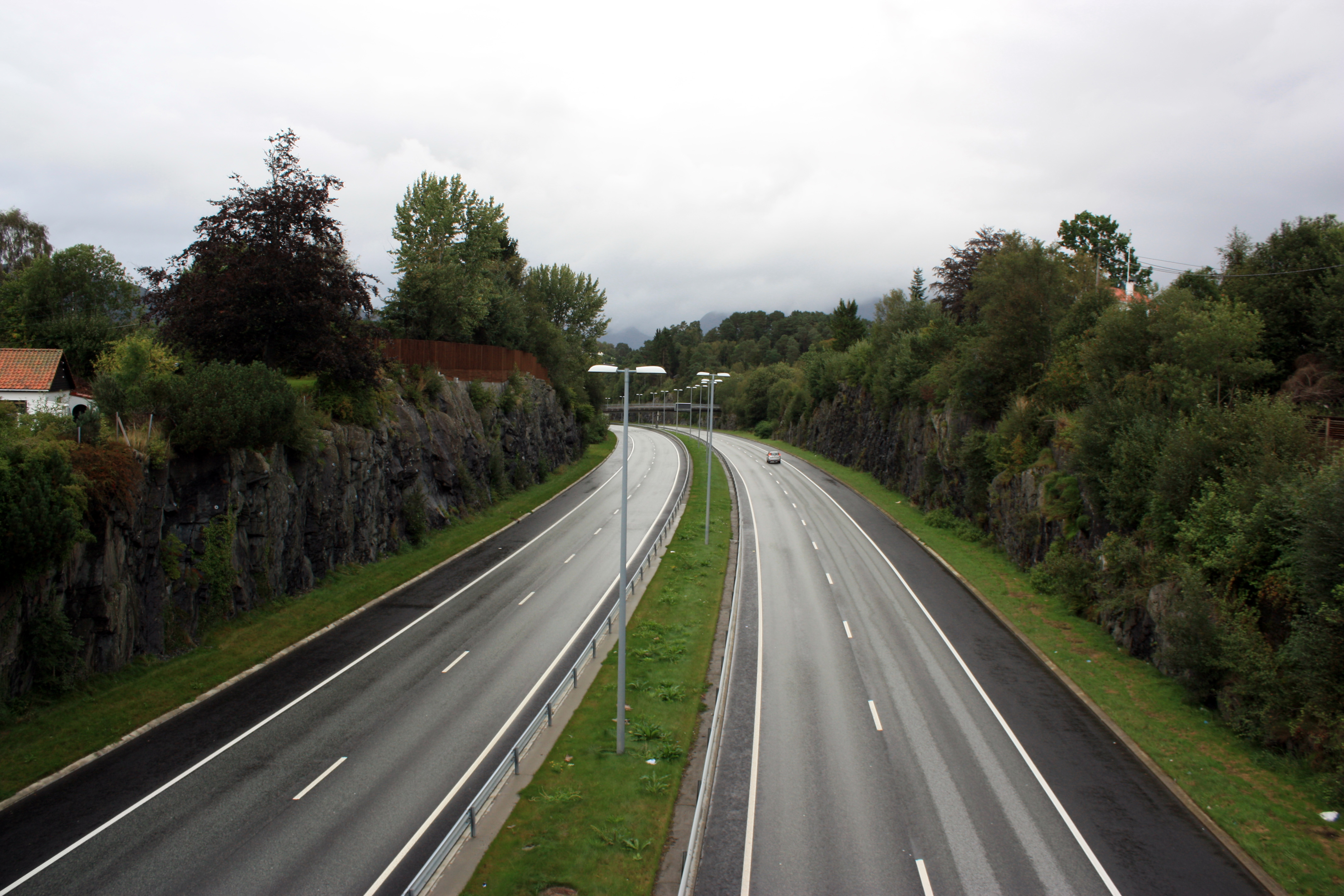
Fritz C. Riebers vei, a motorvei in Bergen.

The primary mountain region on the peninsula is Gullfjellet, with the 987-metre (3,238 ft) tall mountain Gullfjellstoppen as the highest peak. A number of lower peaks are found on, or connected to, the Gullfjellet massif. Another significant mountain plateau, Ulriken - Vidden - Rundemanen, is found just east of Bergen's city centre. Sveningen is another massif south of Gullfjellet, bordering Samnanger and Os municipalities. Additionally, a number of smaller mountains and forest hills are scattered around within the peninsula.

All of the mountains are highly accessible to the public, seen in light of road access, trail systems, and low climbing difficulty. Both Gullfjellet and the Ulriken - Vidden - Rundemanen massif by Bergen are popular in all seasons. The Ulriken - Vidden - Rundemanen massif also offer easy access through gondola and funicular railway. The leveled plateau between Rundemanen and Ulriken is excellent for skiing in winter, providing the snow stays.

Those who seek behind the public trails will also find routes on the massifs mentioned above. You will even find scrambling opportunities near Bergen through the ridges on Søre Midtfjell and on the north side of Ulriken.

== Transport ==
Bergen Peninsula has many roads and highways. The two main highways are the European route E16 highway running from the city of Bergen to the east and the European route E39 highway running north–south through the city of Bergen. The Nordhordland Bridge on the E39 highway connects the Bergen peninsula to the islands and mainland to the north. There are rail connections along the Bergen Line railway that run through the mountain Ulriken to Arna from the city center and then on to Oslo. Previously there was a railway line from Nesttun and Os, called Nesttun-Os Railway. Bergen Airport, Flesland, located on the southwestern shore of the peninsula has air connections to other airports in Norway as well as Europe and Asia. This airport serves as main airport for nearly 600,000 people and had five million passengers in 2008.

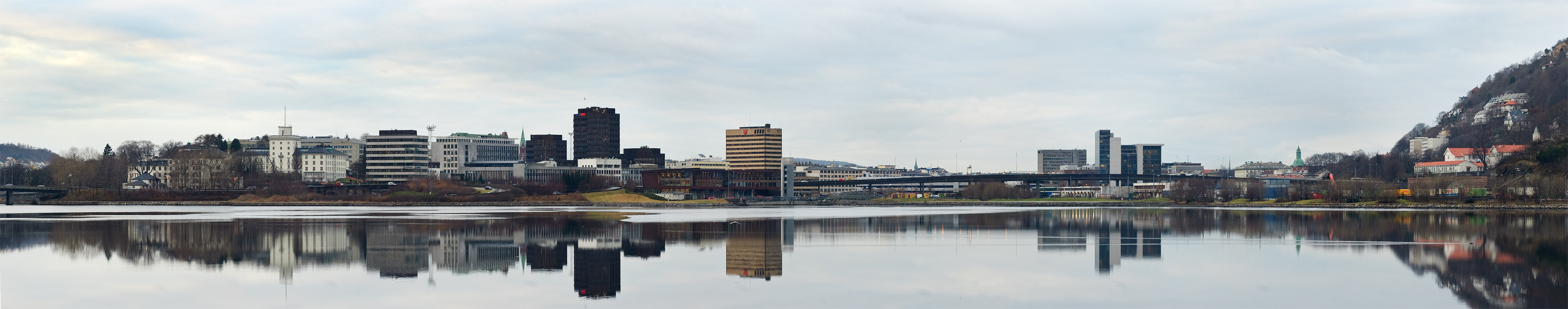
Office buildings in Bergen.
