= Livarden =

Mountain in Bergen, Norway

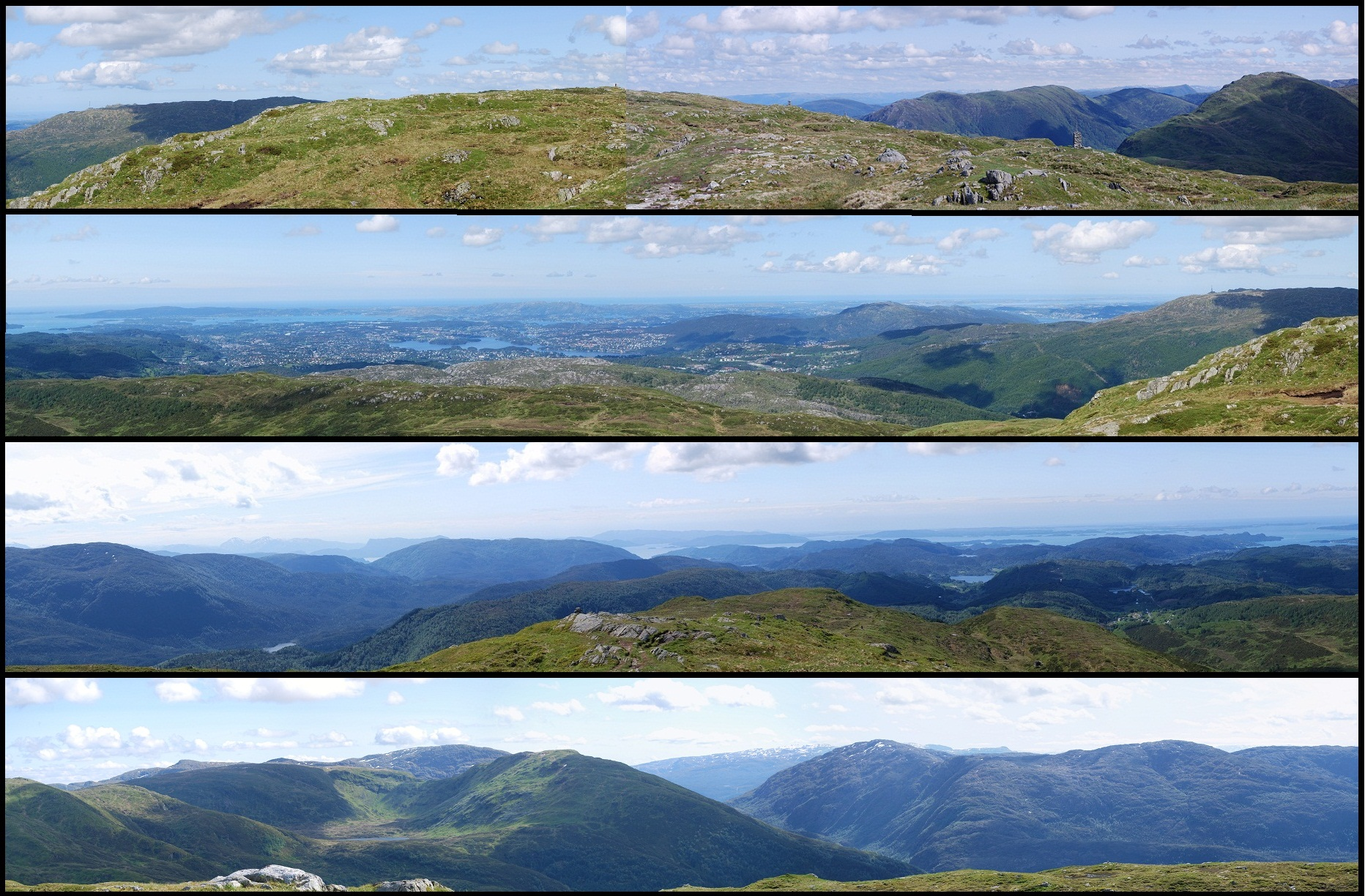
- Views from Livarden from the north, west, south, and east

Highest point
- Elevation: 684 m (2,244 ft)
- Prominence: 208 m (682 ft)
- Parent peak: Gullfjelltoppen
- Isolation: 2.6 km (1.6 mi)
- Coordinates: 60°20′26″N 5°28′15″E

Geography
- Location: Vestland, Norway

Livarden is a mountain in Bergen Municipality in Vestland county, Norway. It is located about 10 kilometres (6.2 mi) southeast of the centre of the city of Bergen. It is located southeast of the Ulriken mountain massif, on the border of the boroughs of Fana and Arna, just south of the village of Espeland. The summit is situated at 684 metres (2,244 ft) above sea level, with a prime factor of 208 metres (682 ft). The mountain Hausdalshorga lies about 3.5 kilometres (2.2 mi) to the west.

== See also ==
- List of mountains of Norway
