= Samnanger Municipality =

Municipality in Vestland, Norway

Samnanger Municipality Samnanger kommune
- Municipality
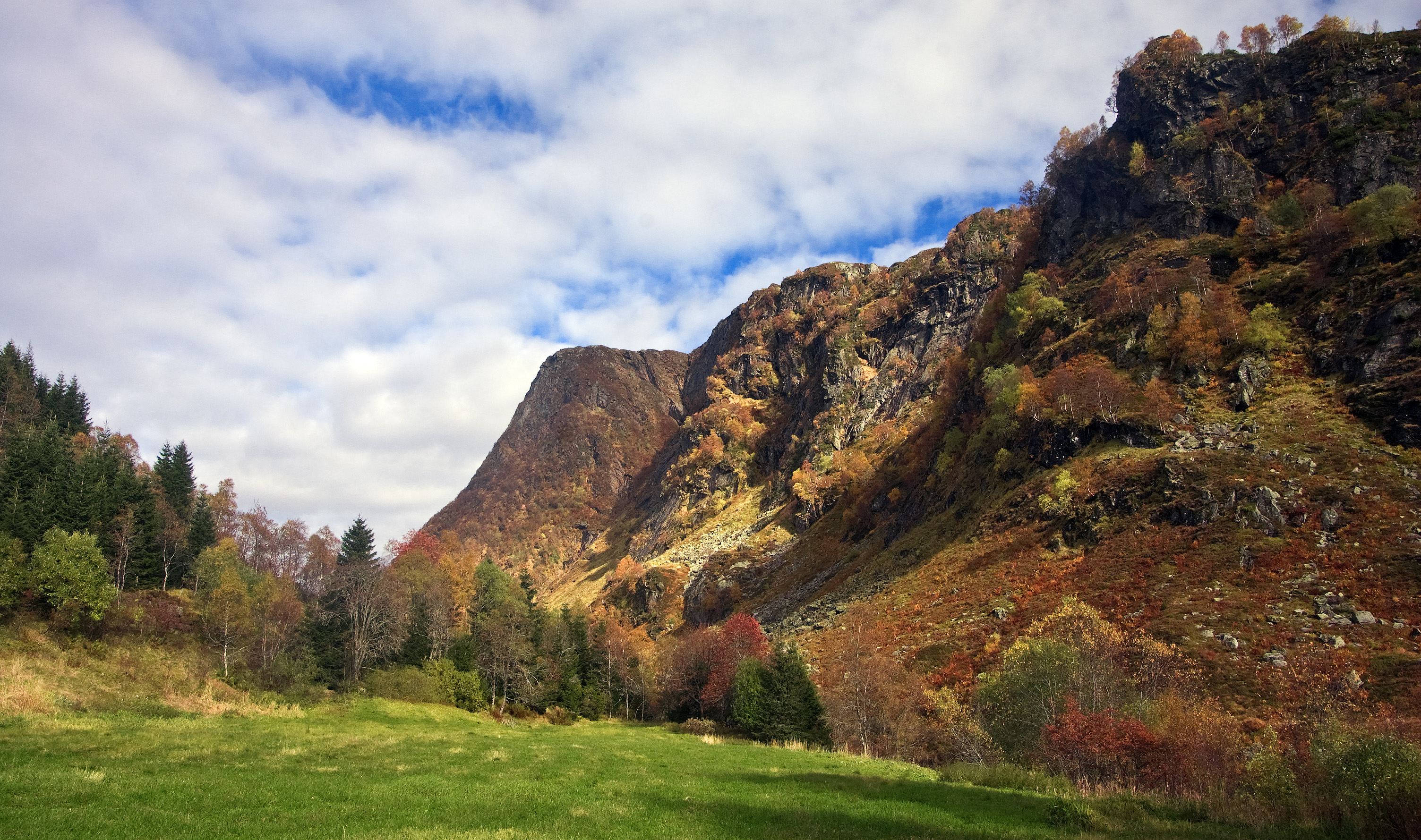
- View of Kvittingen valley area

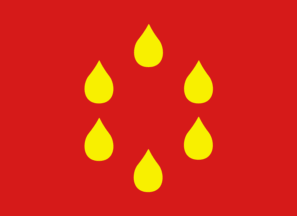
- Flag Coat of arms

- Vestland within Norway

- Samnanger within Vestland
- Coordinates: 60°24′10″N 05°48′20″E
- Country: Norway
- County: Vestland
- District: Midhordland
- Established: 1 Jan 1907
  - Preceded by: Os Municipality
- Administrative centre: Tysse

Government
  - Mayor (2023): Karl Bård Kollbotn (FrP)

Area
  - Total: 269.06 km^{2} (103.88 sq mi)
  - Land: 257.4 km^{2} (99.4 sq mi)
  - Water: 11.66 km^{2} (4.50 sq mi) 4.3%
  - Rank: #274 in Norway
- Highest elevation: 1,297.77 m (4,257.8 ft)

Population (2025)
  - Total: 2,491
  - Rank: #257 in Norway
  - Density: 9.3/km^{2} (24/sq mi)
  - Change (10 years): ▲ +2.7%
- Demonym: Samning

Official language
  - Norwegian form: Nynorsk
- Time zone: UTC+01:00 (CET)
  - Summer (DST): UTC+02:00 (CEST)
- ISO 3166 code: NO-4623
- Website: Official website

Samnanger (Urban East Norwegian: [ˈsɑ̂mnɑŋər]) is a municipality in the Midhordland region of Vestland county, Norway. The administrative centre of the municipality is the village of Tysse. Other main villages in the municipality include Haga, Bjørkheim, and Ådland. The municipality is located about 20 kilometres (12 mi) east of the city of Bergen, Norway's second largest city. It surrounds the inner part of the Samnangerfjorden and the surrounding valleys. There are mountains that surround the municipality. The development of hydroelectric power plants started here in 1909.

The 269.06-square-kilometre (103.88 sq mi) municipality is the 274th largest by area out of the 357 municipalities in Norway. Samnanger Municipality is the 257th most populous municipality in Norway with a population of 2,491. The municipality's population density is 9.3 inhabitants per square kilometre (24/sq mi) and its population has increased by 2.7% over the previous 10-year period.

== General information ==
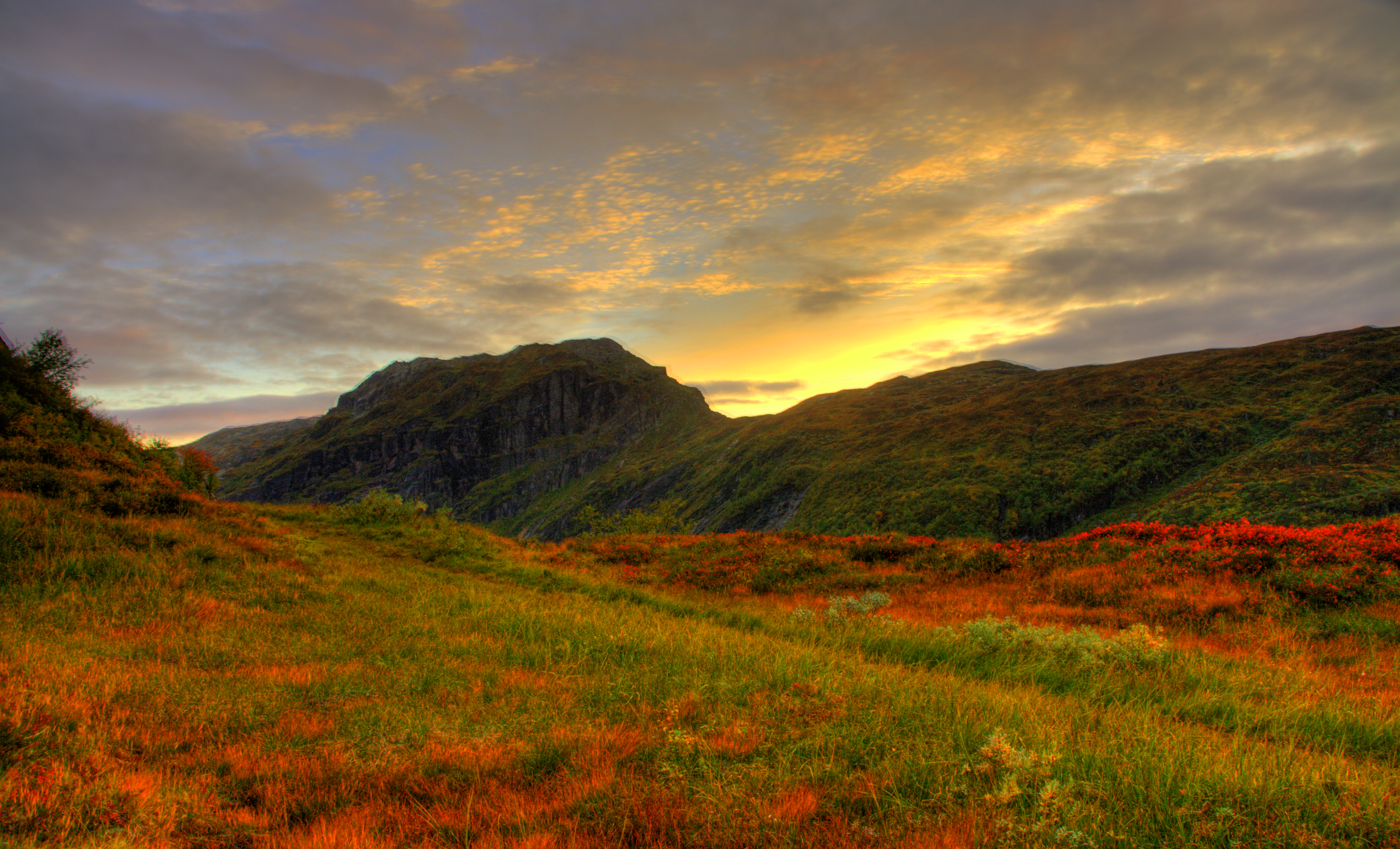
View of Klungerdalsnipa

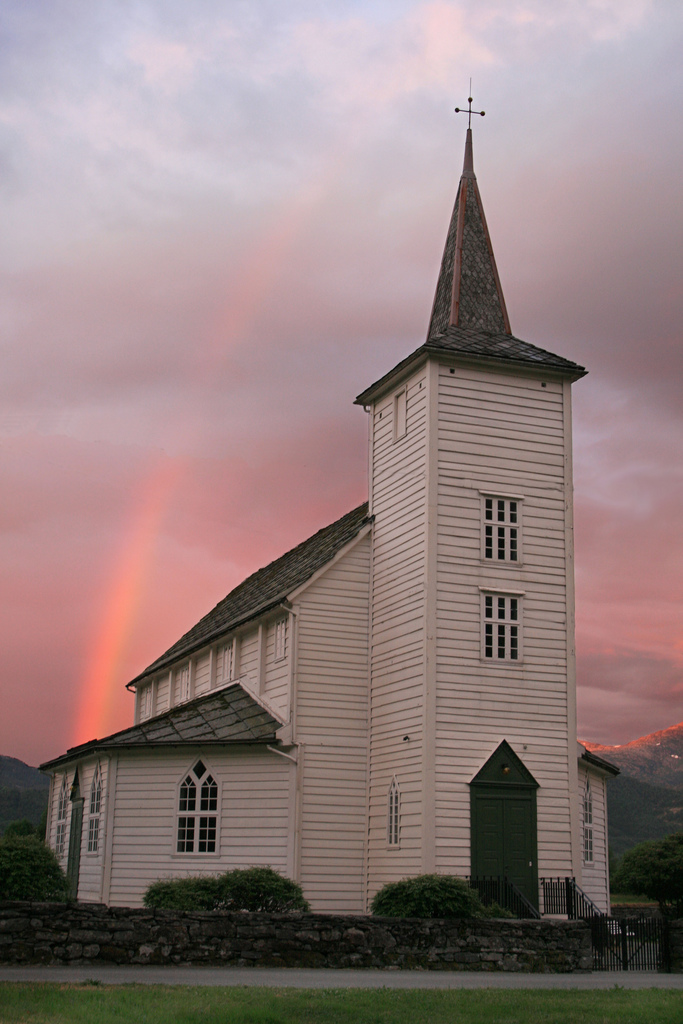
Samnanger Church

The municipality of Samnanger was established on 1 January 1907 when it was separated from the large Os Municipality. Initially, Samnanger Municipality had 3,025 residents. The borders of the municipality have not changed since that time.

Historically, this municipality was part of the old Hordaland county. On 1 January 2020, the municipality became a part of the newly-formed Vestland county (after Hordaland and Sogn og Fjordane counties were merged).

=== Name ===
The municipality (originally the parish) is named after the Samnangerfjorden (Old Norse: Samnangr) since it is a central geographic feature in the area. The first element is likely the old name for a local river, possibly derived from the word sǫmn which has an unknown meaning. The last element is angr which means "bay" or "inlet".

=== Coat of arms ===
The coat of arms was granted on 27 April 1990. The official blazon is "Gules, six gouttes Or in annulo" (Norwegian: På raud grunn seks gule dråpar som lagar ein sirkel). This means the arms have a red field (background) and the charge is a set of six gouttes (drops of water) arranged in a circle. The charge has a tincture of Or which means it is commonly colored yellow, but if it is made out of metal, then gold is used. Water was chosen as a symbol on the arms because of the wet climate and the source of hydroelectricity that is prevalent in the area. The arms were designed by Even Jarl Skoglund. The municipal flag has the same design as the coat of arms.

=== Churches ===
The Church of Norway has one parish (sokn) within Samnanger Municipality. It is part of the Hardanger og Voss prosti (deanery) in the Diocese of Bjørgvin.

Churches in Samnanger Municipality
| Parish (sokn) | Church name | Location of the church | Year built |
|---|---|---|---|
| Samnanger | Haga Church | Haga | 1995 |
| Samnanger | Ådland Church | Ådland | 1851 |

== Geography ==
Samnanger Municipality lies at the inner end of the Samnangerfjorden. Bjørnafjorden Municipality lies to the south, Bergen Municipality is to the west, Vaksdal Municipality is to the north, and Kvam Municipality is to the east. Samnanger Municipality lies on the mainland of Norway, but its western parts lie on the Bergen Peninsula—a large peninsula connected to the mainland by a small isthmus of land running between Trengereid in Bergen and Trengereidfjorden in Samnanger.

The Gullfjellet mountains lie along the western border of the municipality. The highest point in the municipality is the 1,297.77-metre (4,257.8 ft) tall mountain Tveitakvitingen, a tripoint on the border of the municipalities of Samnanger, Bjørnafjorden, and Kvam. The mountain Sveningen is another tripoint on the border with Samnanger, Bergen, and Bjørnafjorden municipalities. The Kvamskogen mountain plateau lies along the eastern border of the municipality.

== Government ==
Samnanger Municipality is responsible for primary education (through 10th grade), outpatient health services, senior citizen services, welfare and other social services, zoning, economic development, and municipal roads and utilities. The municipality is governed by a municipal council of directly elected representatives. The mayor is indirectly elected by a vote of the municipal council. The municipality is under the jurisdiction of the Hordaland District Court and the Gulating Court of Appeal.

=== Municipal council ===
The municipal council (Kommunestyre) of Samnanger Municipality is made up of 21 representatives that are elected to four year terms. The tables below show the current and historical composition of the council by political party.

Samnanger kommunestyre 2023–2027
| Party name (in Nynorsk) | Number of representatives |
|---|---|
| Labour Party (Arbeidarpartiet) | 4 |
| Progress Party (Framstegspartiet) | 5 |
| Green Party (Miljøpartiet Dei Grøne) | 2 |
| Conservative Party (Høgre) | 2 |
| Industry and Business Party (Industri‑ og Næringspartiet) | 3 |
| Christian Democratic Party (Kristeleg Folkeparti) | 1 |
| Centre Party (Senterpartiet) | 1 |
| Local list (Bygdalista) | 3 |
| Total number of members: | 21 |

Samnanger kommunestyre 2019–2023
| Party name (in Nynorsk) | Number of representatives |
|---|---|
| Labour Party (Arbeidarpartiet) | 4 |
| Progress Party (Framstegspartiet) | 3 |
| Green Party (Miljøpartiet Dei Grøne) | 2 |
| Conservative Party (Høgre) | 1 |
| Christian Democratic Party (Kristeleg Folkeparti) | 1 |
| Centre Party (Senterpartiet) | 2 |
| Local List (Bygdalista) | 8 |
| Total number of members: | 21 |

Samnanger kommunestyre 2015–2019
| Party name (in Nynorsk) | Number of representatives |
|---|---|
| Labour Party (Arbeidarpartiet) | 5 |
| Progress Party (Framstegspartiet) | 4 |
| Green Party (Miljøpartiet Dei Grøne) | 1 |
| Conservative Party (Høgre) | 2 |
| Christian Democratic Party (Kristeleg Folkeparti) | 2 |
| Centre Party (Senterpartiet) | 2 |
| Local List (Bygdalista) | 5 |
| Total number of members: | 21 |

Samnanger kommunestyre 2011–2015
| Party name (in Nynorsk) | Number of representatives |
|---|---|
| Labour Party (Arbeidarpartiet) | 6 |
| Progress Party (Framstegspartiet) | 4 |
| Conservative Party (Høgre) | 2 |
| Christian Democratic Party (Kristeleg Folkeparti) | 4 |
| Centre Party (Senterpartiet) | 2 |
| Local List (Bygdalista) | 3 |
| Total number of members: | 21 |

Samnanger kommunestyre 2007–2011
| Party name (in Nynorsk) | Number of representatives |
|---|---|
| Labour Party (Arbeidarpartiet) | 6 |
| Progress Party (Framstegspartiet) | 3 |
| Conservative Party (Høgre) | 2 |
| Christian Democratic Party (Kristeleg Folkeparti) | 5 |
| Centre Party (Senterpartiet) | 2 |
| Local List (Bygdalista) | 3 |
| Total number of members: | 21 |

Samnanger kommunestyre 2003–2007
| Party name (in Nynorsk) | Number of representatives |
|---|---|
| Labour Party (Arbeidarpartiet) | 7 |
| Progress Party (Framstegspartiet) | 2 |
| Conservative Party (Høgre) | 1 |
| Christian Democratic Party (Kristeleg Folkeparti) | 4 |
| Centre Party (Senterpartiet) | 3 |
| Local List (Bygdalista) | 4 |
| Total number of members: | 21 |

Samnanger kommunestyre 1999–2003
| Party name (in Nynorsk) | Number of representatives |
|---|---|
| Labour Party (Arbeidarpartiet) | 7 |
| Progress Party (Framstegspartiet) | 1 |
| Conservative Party (Høgre) | 1 |
| Christian Democratic Party (Kristeleg Folkeparti) | 5 |
| Centre Party (Senterpartiet) | 2 |
| Local List (Bygdalista) | 5 |
| Total number of members: | 21 |

Samnanger kommunestyre 1995–1999
| Party name (in Nynorsk) | Number of representatives |
|---|---|
| Labour Party (Arbeidarpartiet) | 9 |
| Conservative Party (Høgre) | 2 |
| Christian Democratic Party (Kristeleg Folkeparti) | 3 |
| Centre Party (Senterpartiet) | 3 |
| Local list (Bygdalista) | 4 |
| Total number of members: | 21 |

Samnanger kommunestyre 1991–1995
| Party name (in Nynorsk) | Number of representatives |
|---|---|
| Labour Party (Arbeidarpartiet) | 7 |
| Progress Party (Framstegspartiet) | 1 |
| Conservative Party (Høgre) | 2 |
| Christian Democratic Party (Kristeleg Folkeparti) | 4 |
| Local list (Bygdalista) | 3 |
| Total number of members: | 17 |

Samnanger kommunestyre 1987–1991
| Party name (in Nynorsk) | Number of representatives |
|---|---|
| Labour Party (Arbeidarpartiet) | 7 |
| Conservative Party (Høgre) | 2 |
| Christian Democratic Party (Kristeleg Folkeparti) | 4 |
| Local list (Bygdalista) | 4 |
| Total number of members: | 17 |

Samnanger kommunestyre 1983–1987
| Party name (in Nynorsk) | Number of representatives |
|---|---|
| Labour Party (Arbeidarpartiet) | 7 |
| Conservative Party (Høgre) | 2 |
| Christian Democratic Party (Kristeleg Folkeparti) | 4 |
| Local list (Bygdalista) | 4 |
| Total number of members: | 17 |

Samnanger kommunestyre 1979–1983
| Party name (in Nynorsk) | Number of representatives |
|---|---|
| Labour Party (Arbeidarpartiet) | 6 |
| Conservative Party (Høgre) | 3 |
| Christian Democratic Party (Kristeleg Folkeparti) | 4 |
| Local list (Bygdalista) | 4 |
| Total number of members: | 17 |

Samnanger kommunestyre 1975–1979
| Party name (in Nynorsk) | Number of representatives |
|---|---|
| Labour Party (Arbeidarpartiet) | 7 |
| Conservative Party (Høgre) | 2 |
| Christian Democratic Party (Kristeleg Folkeparti) | 4 |
| Local list for Samnanger (Bygdelista for Samnanger) | 4 |
| Total number of members: | 17 |

Samnanger kommunestyre 1971–1975
| Party name (in Nynorsk) | Number of representatives |
|---|---|
| Labour Party (Arbeidarpartiet) | 9 |
| Conservative Party (Høgre) | 1 |
| Christian Democratic Party (Kristeleg Folkeparti) | 3 |
| Local List(s) (Lokale lister) | 4 |
| Total number of members: | 17 |

Samnanger kommunestyre 1967–1971
| Party name (in Nynorsk) | Number of representatives |
|---|---|
| Labour Party (Arbeidarpartiet) | 7 |
| Conservative Party (Høgre) | 1 |
| Christian Democratic Party (Kristeleg Folkeparti) | 4 |
| Joint List(s) of Non-Socialist Parties (Borgarlege Felleslister) | 4 |
| Local List(s) (Lokale lister) | 1 |
| Total number of members: | 17 |

Samnanger kommunestyre 1963–1967
| Party name (in Nynorsk) | Number of representatives |
|---|---|
| Labour Party (Arbeidarpartiet) | 6 |
| Conservative Party (Høgre) | 1 |
| Christian Democratic Party (Kristeleg Folkeparti) | 4 |
| Local List(s) (Lokale lister) | 6 |
| Total number of members: | 17 |

Samnanger heradsstyre 1959–1963
| Party name (in Nynorsk) | Number of representatives |
|---|---|
| Labour Party (Arbeidarpartiet) | 4 |
| Conservative Party (Høgre) | 1 |
| Christian Democratic Party (Kristeleg Folkeparti) | 3 |
| Local List(s) (Lokale lister) | 9 |
| Total number of members: | 17 |

Samnanger heradsstyre 1955–1959
| Party name (in Nynorsk) | Number of representatives |
|---|---|
| Labour Party (Arbeidarpartiet) | 5 |
| Conservative Party (Høgre) | 2 |
| Joint List(s) of Non-Socialist Parties (Borgarlege Felleslister) | 4 |
| Local List(s) (Lokale lister) | 6 |
| Total number of members: | 17 |

Samnanger heradsstyre 1951–1955
| Party name (in Nynorsk) | Number of representatives |
|---|---|
| Labour Party (Arbeidarpartiet) | 6 |
| Conservative Party (Høgre) | 1 |
| Joint List(s) of Non-Socialist Parties (Borgarlege Felleslister) | 4 |
| Local List(s) (Lokale lister) | 5 |
| Total number of members: | 16 |

Samnanger heradsstyre 1947–1951
| Party name (in Nynorsk) | Number of representatives |
|---|---|
| Labour Party (Arbeidarpartiet) | 5 |
| Communist Party (Kommunistiske Parti) | 1 |
| Local List(s) (Lokale lister) | 10 |
| Total number of members: | 16 |

Samnanger heradsstyre 1945–1947
| Party name (in Nynorsk) | Number of representatives |
|---|---|
| Labour Party (Arbeidarpartiet) | 5 |
| Local List(s) (Lokale lister) | 11 |
| Total number of members: | 16 |

Samnanger heradsstyre 1937–1941*
| Party name (in Nynorsk) | Number of representatives |
|---|---|
| Labour Party (Arbeidarpartiet) | 5 |
| Joint List(s) of Non-Socialist Parties (Borgarlege Felleslister) | 10 |
| Local List(s) (Lokale lister) | 1 |
| Total number of members: | 16 |
Note: Due to the German occupation of Norway during World War II, no elections were held for new municipal councils until after the war ended in 1945.

=== Mayors ===
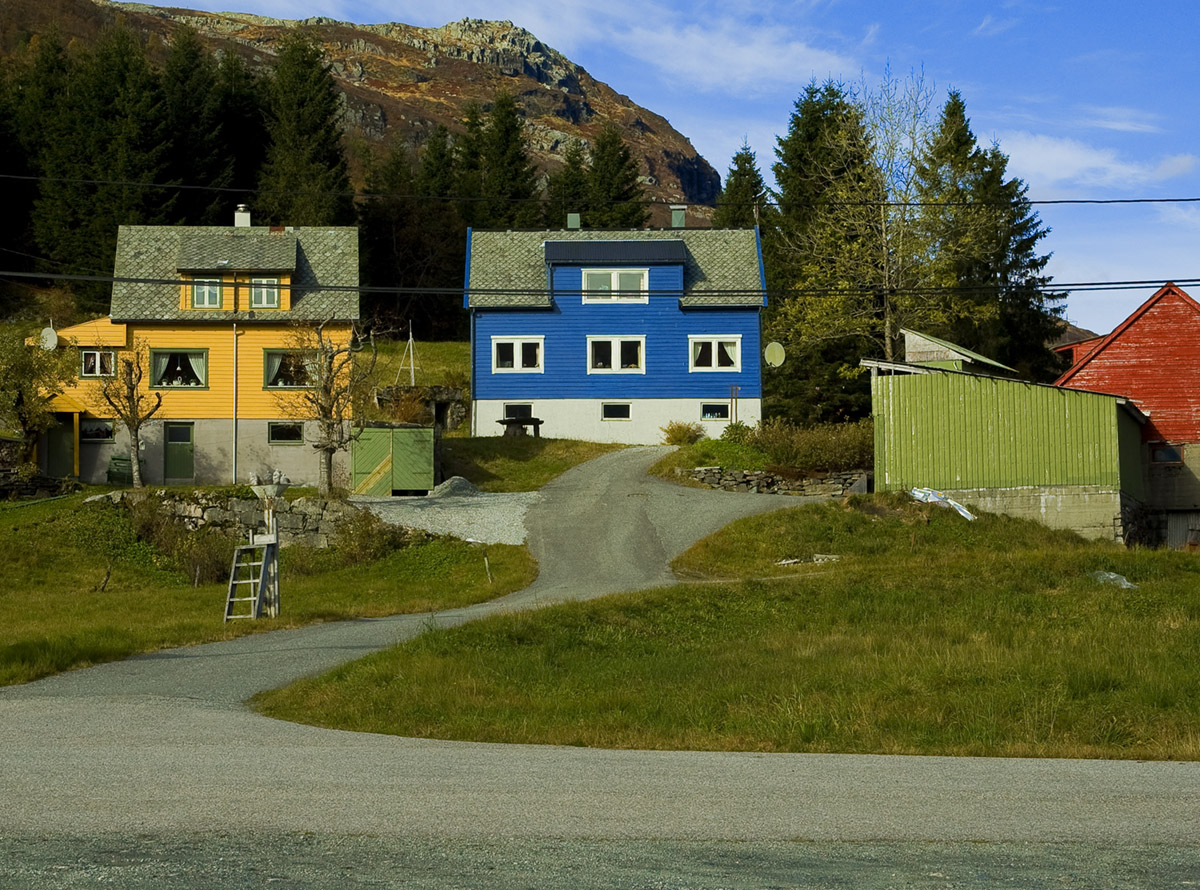
View of some typical houses in Samnanger

The mayor (Nynorsk: ordførar) of Samnanger Municipality is the political leader of the municipality and the chairperson of the municipal council. The following people have held this position:

- 1907–1916: Nils S. Røsseland
- 1916–1928: Knut Tvedt (V)
- 1929–1943: Johannes Gaupholm (LL)
- 1943–1945: Johannes Tveiterås (NS)
- 1945–1945: Nils K. Langeland
- 1946–1959: Ingjald Tveit (LL)
- 1960–1963: Mons Tveit (LL)
- 1964–1967: Martin K. Nilsen (Ap)
- 1968–1971: Ragnvald Brigsten (KrF)
- 1972–1975: Martin K. Nilsen (Ap)
- 1976–1977: Knut N. Langeland (LL)
- 1978–1979: Martin K. Nilsen (Ap)
- 1980–1981: Knut N. Langeland (LL)
- 1982–1991: Brynjulv Hernes (KrF)
- 1991–1999: Brigt Olav Gåsdal (Ap)
- 1999–2015: Marit A. Aase (KrF)
- 2015–2023: Knut Harald Frøland (LL)
- 2023–present: Karl Bård Kollbotn (FrP)

=== Police ===
In 2016, the chief of police for Vestlandet formally suggested a reconfiguration of police districts and stations. He proposed that the police station in Samnanger be closed.

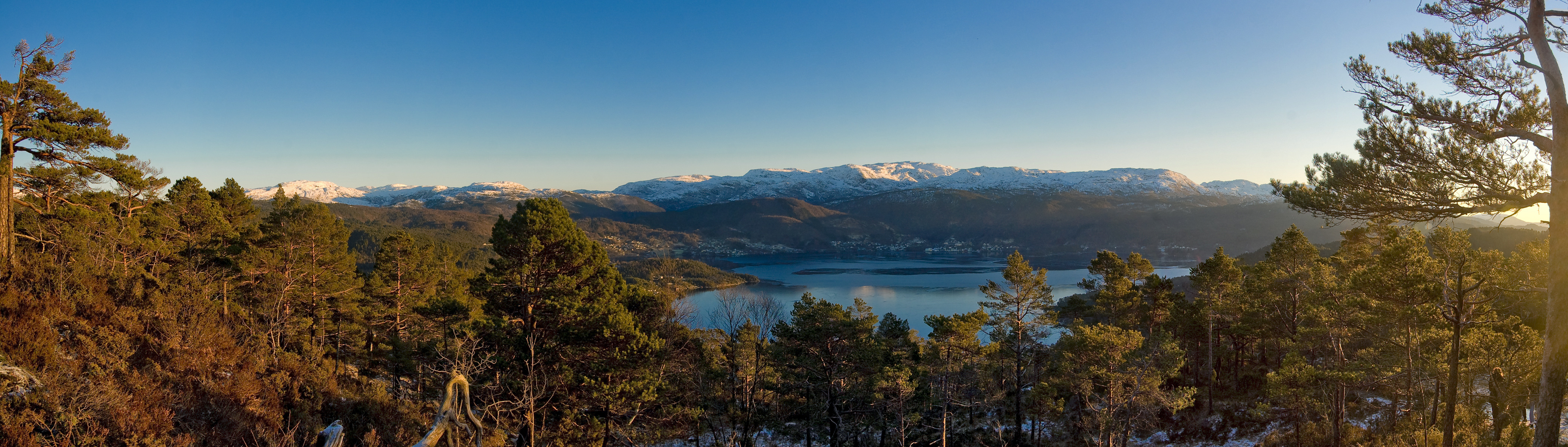
Samnanger, the body of water is the inner part of the Samanger Fjord.

== Population ==
Historical population
| Year | 1907 | 1910 | 1920 | 1930 | 1946 | 1951 | 1960 | 1970 | 1980 | 1990 | 2000 | 2010 | 2020 | 2023 |
| Pop. | 3,025 | 3,025 | 2,664 | 2,588 | 2,440 | 2,503 | 2,493 | 2,180 | 2,305 | 2,412 | 2,282 | 2,375 | 2,485 | 2,495 |
| ±% p.a. | — | +0.00% | −1.26% | −0.29% | −0.37% | +0.51% | −0.04% | −1.33% | +0.56% | +0.45% | −0.55% | +0.40% | +0.45% | +0.13% |
Source: Statistics Norway and Norwegian Historical Data Centre

== Notable people ==
- Knud Langeland (1813–1886), an American editor, farmer, and politician who emigrated in 1843
- Gustav Indrebø (1889–1942), a philologist who was interested in toponymy
- Jarle Høysæter (1933–2017), a journalist who worked with NRK and Eurovision
