= Tysse, Vestland =

Village in Samnanger Municipality, Norway

Tysse
- Village
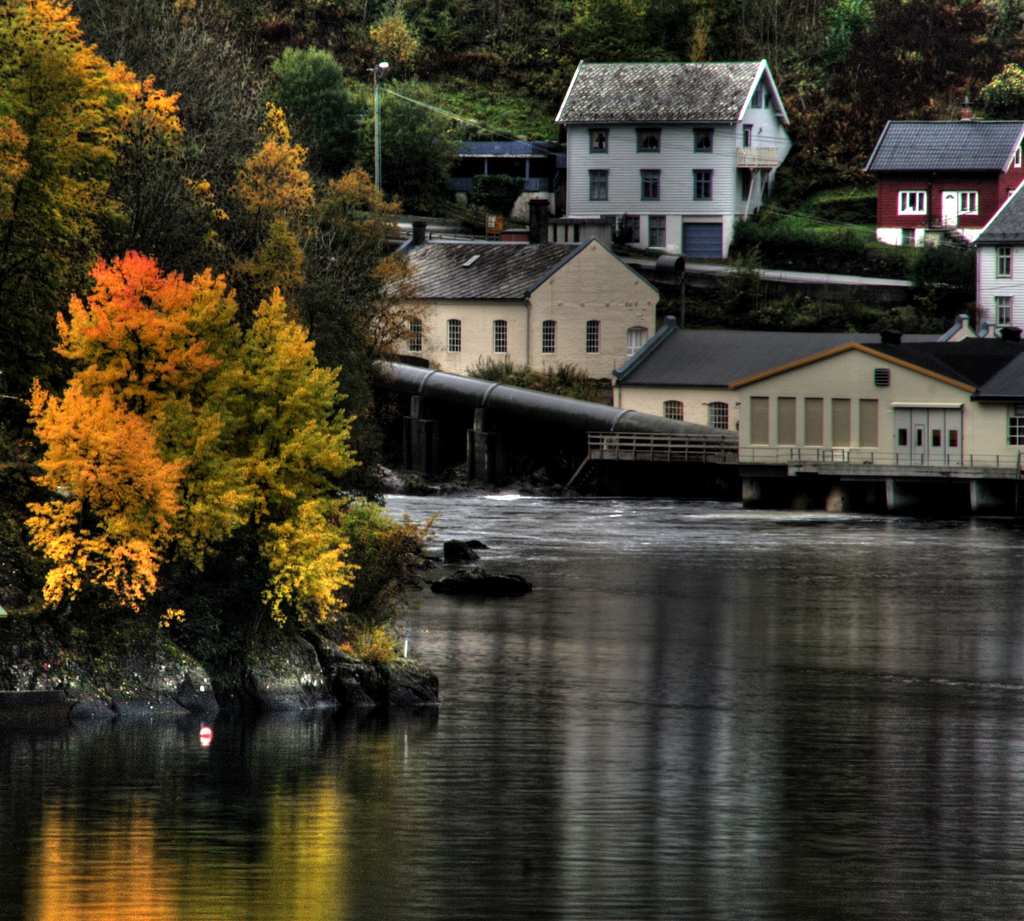
- View of the village
- Interactive map of Tysse
- Coordinates: 60.37404°N 5.75956°E
- Country: Norway
- Region: Western Norway
- County: Vestland
- District: Midthordland
- Municipality: Samnanger Municipality
- Elevation: 18 m (59 ft)
- Time zone: UTC+01:00 (CET)
  - Summer (DST): UTC+02:00 (CEST)
- Post Code: 5650 Tysse

Tysse is the administrative centre of Samnanger Municipality in Vestland county, Norway. The village is located near the end of the Samnangerfjorden. It is located immediately south of the village of Haga, and it is considered to be part of the "urban area" of Haga by Statistics Norway. The village lies at the mouth of the river Tysseelva which runs through the Tyssedalen valley.
