= Haga Church (Norway) =

Church in Vestland, Norway

- Haga kyrkje
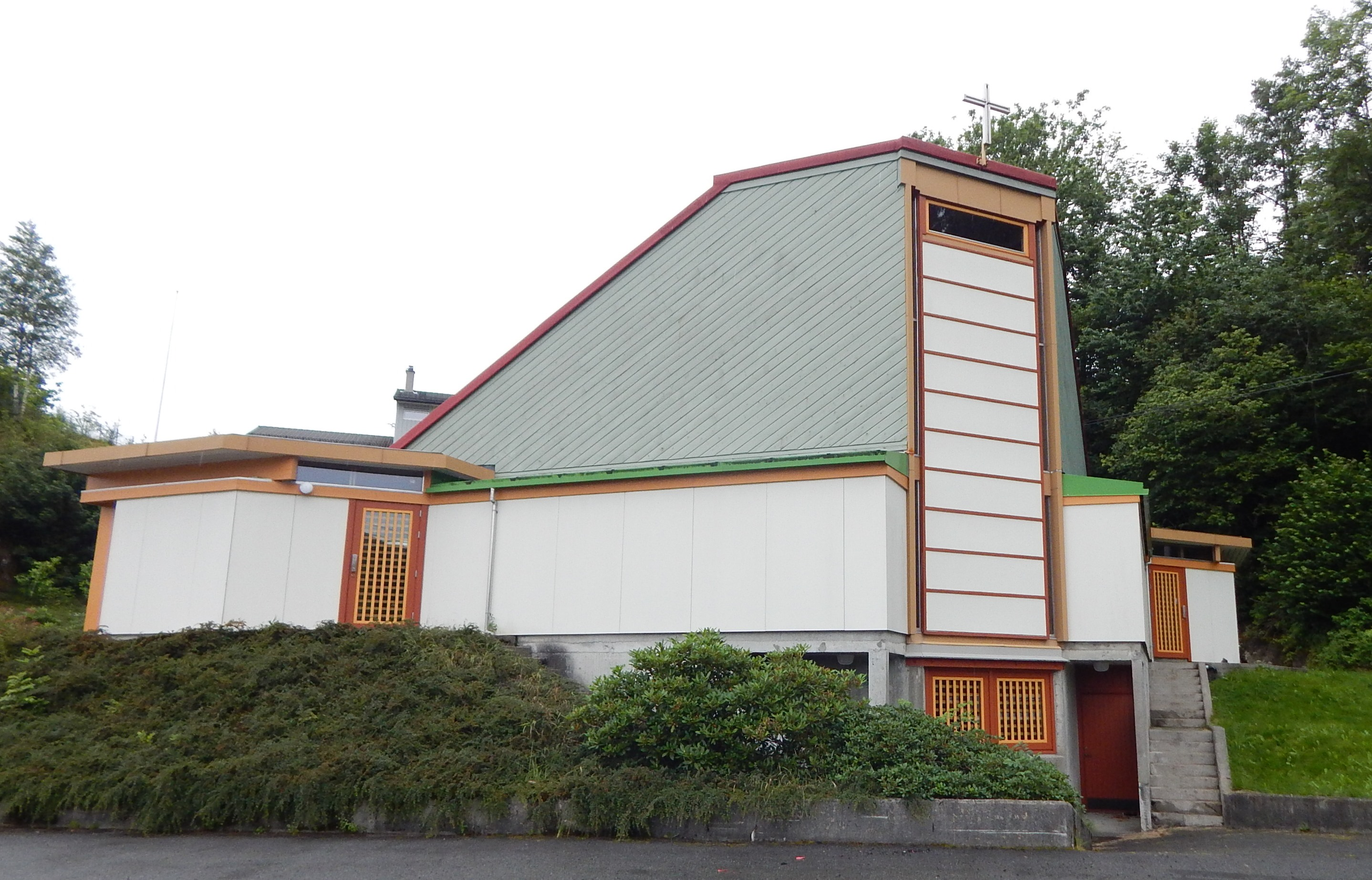
- View of the church
- Haga Church
- 60°23′10″N 5°46′04″E
- Location: Samnanger Municipality, Vestland
- Country: Norway
- Denomination: Church of Norway
- Churchmanship: Evangelical Lutheran

History
- Status: Parish church
- Founded: 1995
- Consecrated: 5 Feb 1995

Architecture
- Functional status: Active
- Architect: Helge Hjertholm
- Architectural type: Fan-shaped
- Completed: 1995 (31 years ago)

Specifications
- Capacity: 230
- Materials: Wood

Administration
- Diocese: Bjørgvin bispedømme
- Deanery: Hardanger og Voss prosti
- Parish: Samnanger

Haga Church (Norwegian: Haga kyrkje) is a parish church of the Church of Norway in Samnanger Municipality in Vestland county, Norway. It is located in the village of Haga. It is one of the two churches for the Samnanger parish which is part of the Hardanger og Voss prosti (deanery) in the Diocese of Bjørgvin. The white, wooden church was built in a fan-shaped design in 1995 using plans drawn up by the architect Helge Hjertholm. The church seats about 230 people.

== History ==
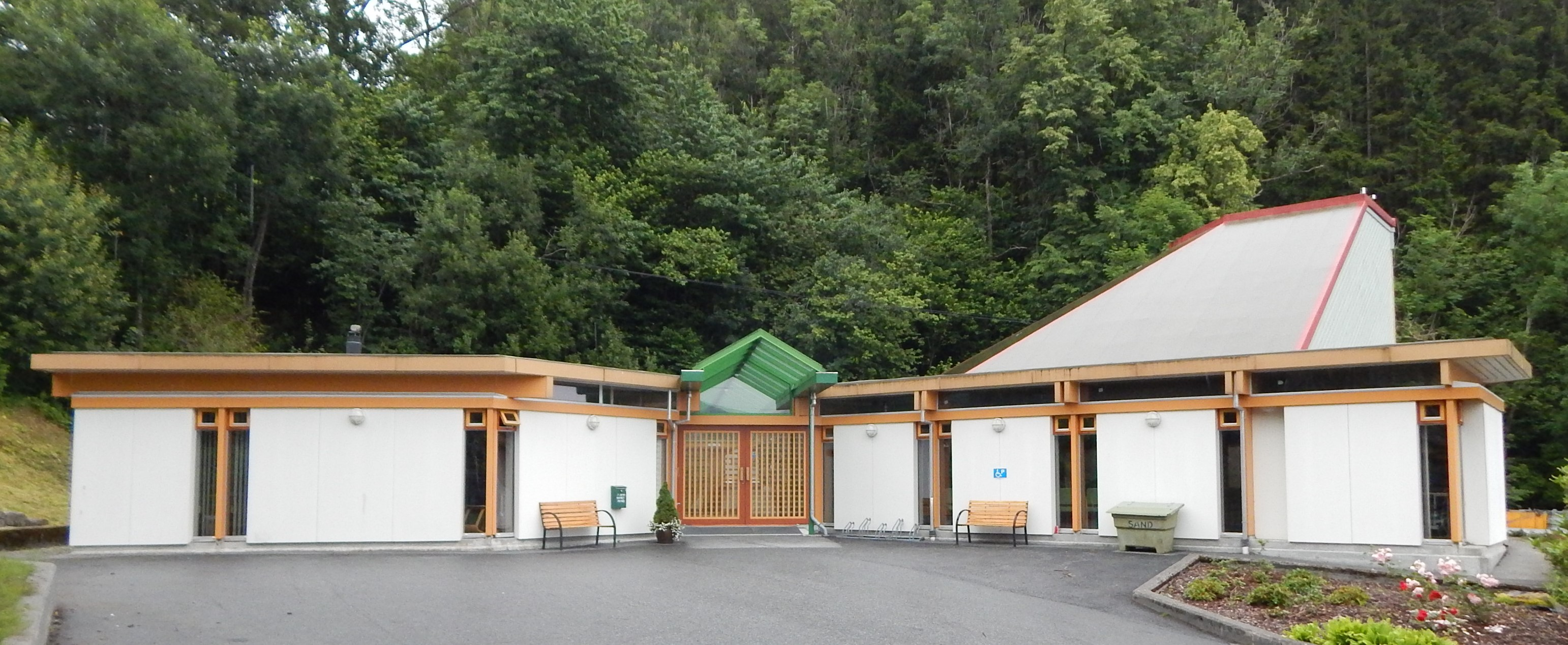
View of the church

In 1903, a small prayer house was built in Haga. In 1920, the prayer house was consecrated as an annex chapel within the parish. A church association was founded in 1944 to raise money for a new church. In 1967, the municipality gave land for the new church. Helge Hjertholm was hired to design the new church, but money ran short and the work could not go forward. In 1982, an association was again set up to manage the fundraising and the volunteer work in connection with the future construction, but it was not until 1991 that municipal approval and grants came through and work began. The foundation stone was laid on 11 October 1992. The church was consecrated on 5 February 1995.

== See also ==
- List of churches in Bjørgvin
