= Hausdalshorga =

Mountain in Bergen, Norway

Highest point
- Elevation: 784 m (2,572 ft)
- Prominence: 116 m (381 ft)
- Parent peak: Austefjellet
- Isolation: 2 km (1.2 mi)
- Coordinates: 60°20′40″N 5°31′45″E

Geography
- Location: Vestland, Norway

Climbing
- Easiest route: Hiking

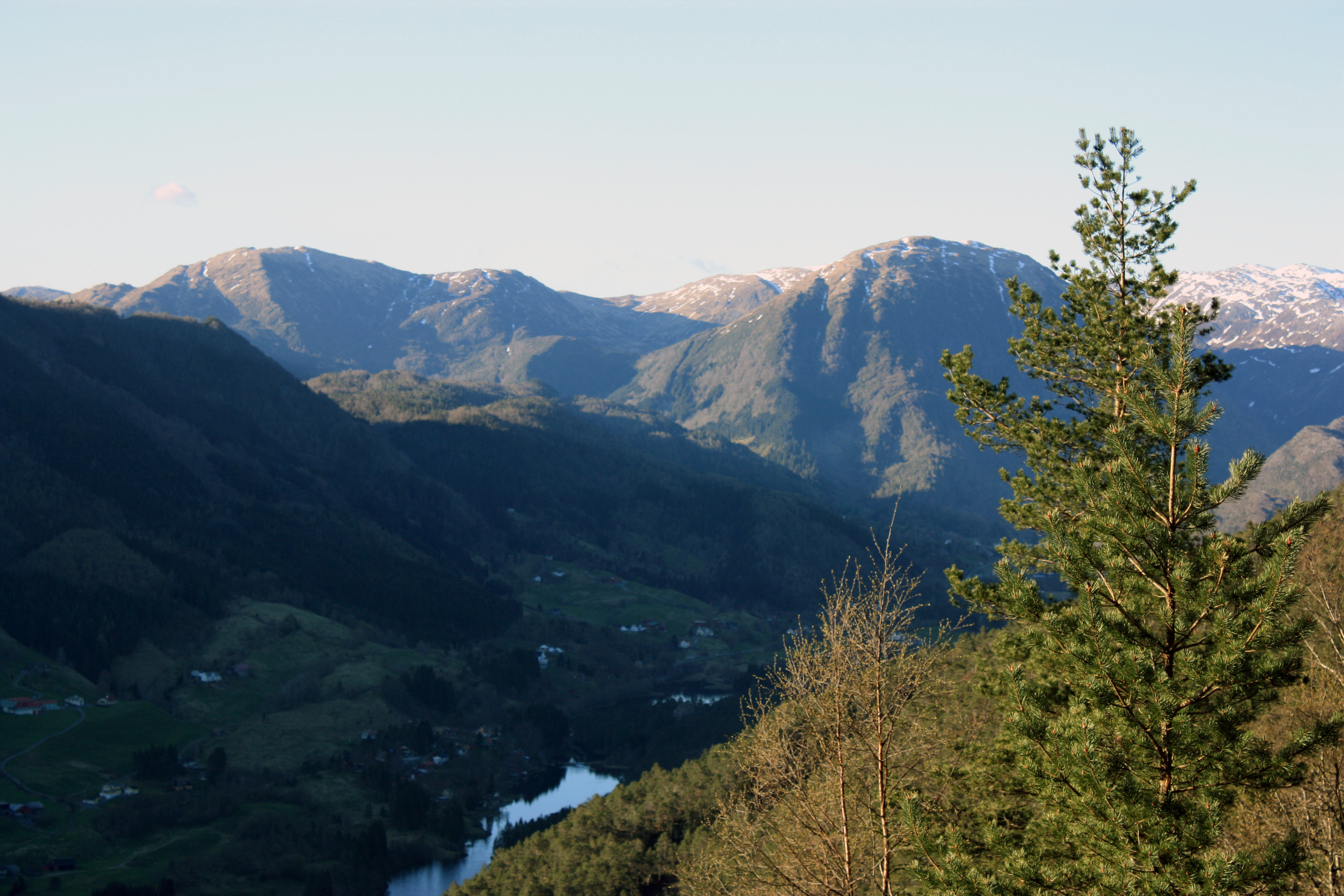
Hausdalshorga and Slettegga

Hausdalshorga is a mountain in Bergen Municipality in Vestland county, Norway. It lies about 12 kilometres (7.5 mi) southeast of the centre of the city of Bergen, near the Gullfjellet mountain massif. The mountain Livarden lies about 3.5 kilometres (2.2 mi) to the west and the mountain Sveningen lies about 3 kilometres (1.9 mi) to the southeast.

== See also ==
- List of mountains of Norway
