= Sveningen =

Mountain in Vestland, Norway

Highest point
- Elevation: 842 m (2,762 ft)
- Prominence: 517 m (1,696 ft)
- Parent peak: Gullfjellet
- Isolation: 3.3 km (2.1 mi)
- Coordinates: 60°19′17″N 5°32′53″E

Geography
- Location: Vestland, Norway

Climbing
- Easiest route: Hiking

Sveningen is a mountain in Vestland county, Norway. The 842-metre (2,762 ft) tall summit of the mountain is a tripoint, marking the border of: Bergen Municipality, Samnanger Municipality, and Bjørnafjorden Municipality. It is the second highest mountain in Bergen Municipality (after Gullfjellet). The mountain Hausdalshorga lies about 3 kilometres (1.9 mi) to the northwest.

== See also ==
- List of mountains of Norway
