= Samnangerfjorden =

Fjord in Vestland, Norway

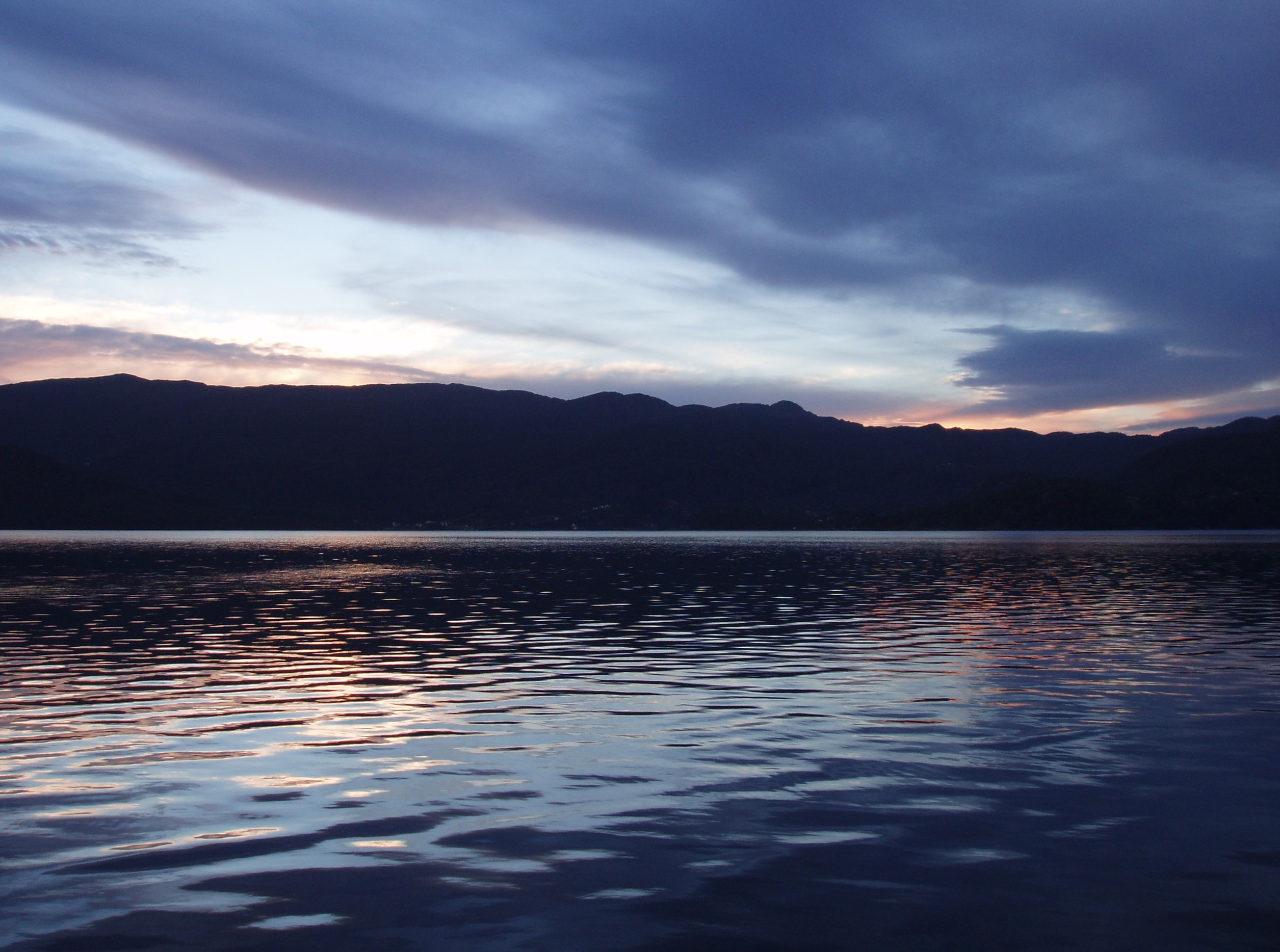
- View of the fjord
- Interactive map of Samnangerfjorden
- Location: Vestland county, Norway
- Coordinates: 60.28616°N 5.62616°E
- Type: Fjord
- Primary outflows: Fusafjorden
- Basin countries: Norway
- Max. length: 22 kilometres (14 mi)

Samnangerfjorden (Urban East Norwegian: [ˈsɑ̂mnɑŋərˌfjuːɳ]) is a fjord in Vestland county, Norway. The 22-kilometre (14 mi) long fjord is located in Bjørnafjorden Municipality and Samnanger Municipality. The head of the fjord is located in Samnanger, surrounded by the villages of Årland, Haga, and Tysse. The fjord flows to the southwest from there and eventually flows into the Fusafjorden (which later joins the large Bjørnafjorden). The fjord forms the southern boundary of the Bergen Peninsula.

== See also ==
- List of Norwegian fjords
