= Bjørnafjorden =

Inlet in Vestland, Norway

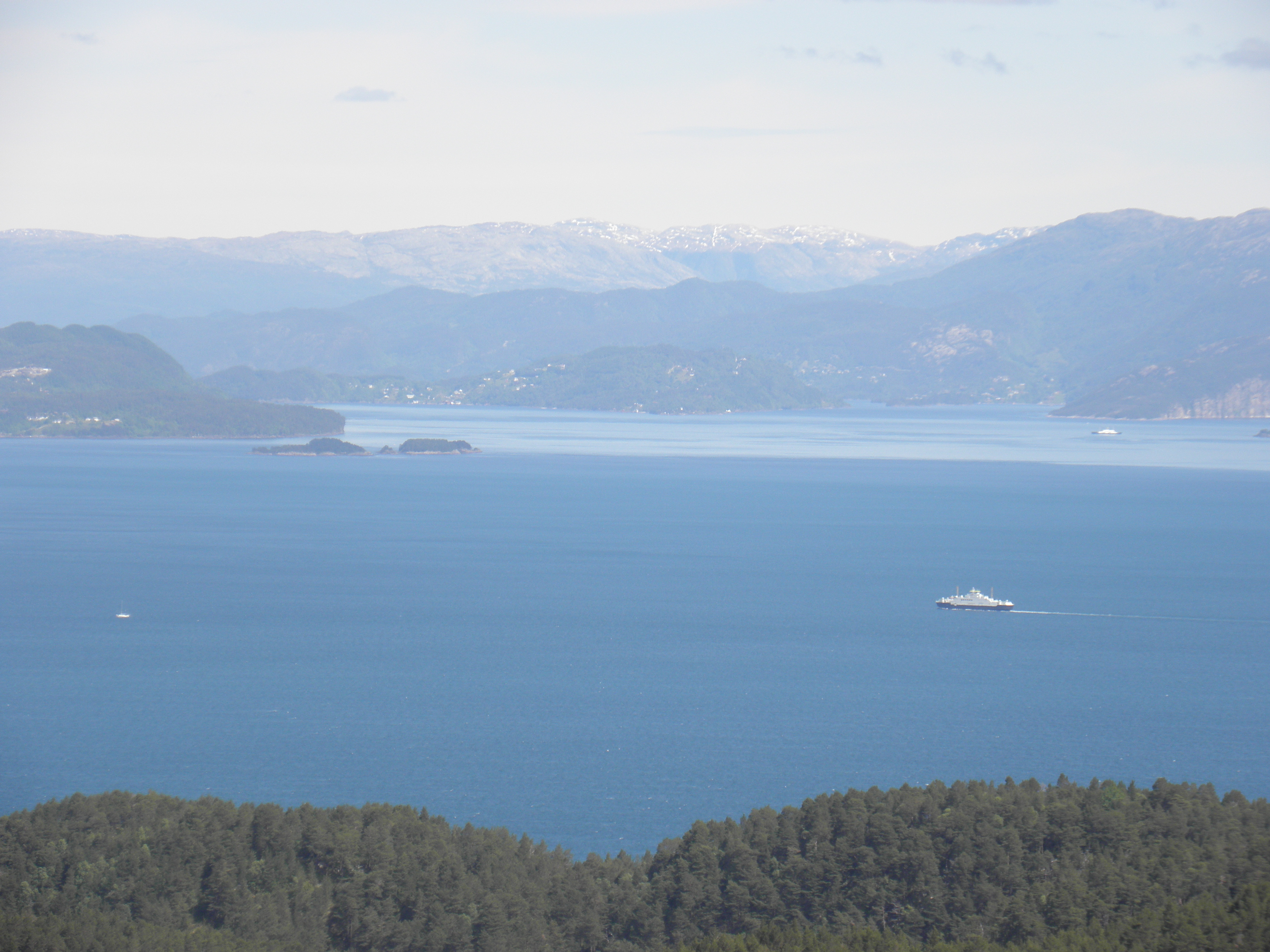
- View of the fjord
- Interactive map of Bjørnafjorden
- Location: Vestland county, Norway
- Coordinates: 60.10752°N 5.51001°E
- Type: Fjord
- Primary inflows: Fusafjorden
- Basin countries: Norway
- Max. length: 30 kilometres (19 mi)
- Max. width: 10 kilometres (6.2 mi)
- Max. depth: 583 metres (1,913 ft)

Bjørnafjorden is a fjord in Vestland county, Norway. It runs through Austevoll Municipality, Bjørnafjorden Municipality, and Tysnes Municipality. The large island of Tysnesøya (and many small, surrounding islands such as Reksteren) lie along the south side of the Bjørnafjorden and the Bergen Peninsula and the mainland lie along the north and east sides of the fjord. The Fusafjorden (and the Samnangerfjorden which branches off it) split off from the main fjord on the north side by the village of Osøyro. The 30-kilometre (19 mi) fjord is about 10 kilometres (6.2 mi) wide and its maximum depth is 583 metres (1,913 ft) below sea level.

Bjørnafjorden Municipality, which was established on 1 January 2020 as a merger between the old Os Municipality and Fusa Municipality, is named after the fjord.

== See also ==
- List of Norwegian fjords
