= Ådland Church =

Church in Vestland, Norway

- Ådland kyrkje
- Samnanger kyrkje (historic)
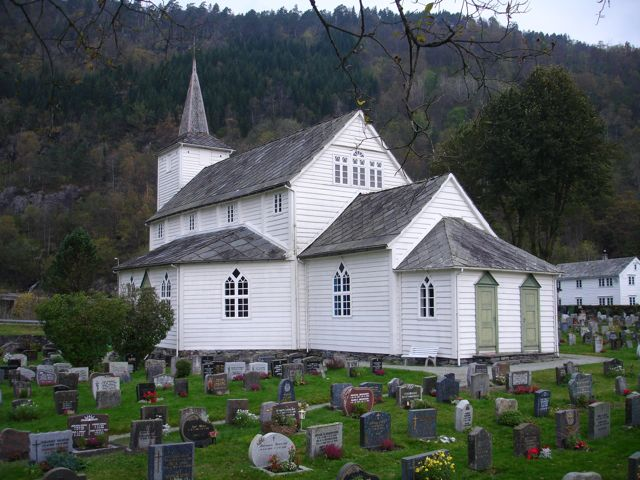
- View of the church
- Ådland Church
- 60°23′59″N 5°42′39″E
- Location: Samnanger Municipality, Vestland
- Country: Norway
- Denomination: Church of Norway
- Previous denomination: Catholic Church
- Churchmanship: Evangelical Lutheran

History
- Status: Parish church
- Founded: 12th century
- Consecrated: 1851

Architecture
- Functional status: Active
- Architect: Andreas Grønning
- Architectural type: Octagonal
- Completed: 1851 (175 years ago)

Specifications
- Capacity: 250
- Materials: Wood

Administration
- Diocese: Bjørgvin bispedømme
- Deanery: Hardanger og Voss prosti
- Parish: Samnanger
- Norwegian Cultural Heritage Site
- Type: Church
- Status: Listed
- ID: 85366

Ådland Church (Norwegian: Ådland kyrkje; historically called Samnanger Church or Samnanger kyrkje) is a parish church of the Church of Norway in Samnanger Municipality in Vestland county, Norway. It is located in the village of Ådland. It is one of the two churches for the Samnanger parish which is part of the Hardanger og Voss prosti (deanery) in the Diocese of Bjørgvin. The white, wooden church was built in an octagonal design in 1851 using plans drawn up by the architect Andreas Grønning. The church seats about 250 people.

== History ==
The earliest existing historical records of the church date back to the year 1329, but it was not new that year. This first church in Samnanger was a wooden stave church that may have been built as early as the 12th century. The church stood a little to the southwest of the present church building. Little is known of the medieval stave church. In 1652, that church was replaced with a new timber-framed long church. That church was long and narrow—about 18 by 8.5 metres (59 by 28 ft). That church was replaced in 1851 with the present church building and it was located slightly to the northeast of the old church site. It was designed by Andreas Grønning who gave it a basilica style, but also gave it an octagonalal floor plan. The lead builder was Johannes Øvsthus. The church was completed and consecrated in 1851. A sacristy was built in 1908 or 1910, and the tower was rebuilt in 1907. In connection with the 100th anniversary in 1951, the interior was renovated and redecorated using designs by the architect Ole Landmark.

== Media gallery ==
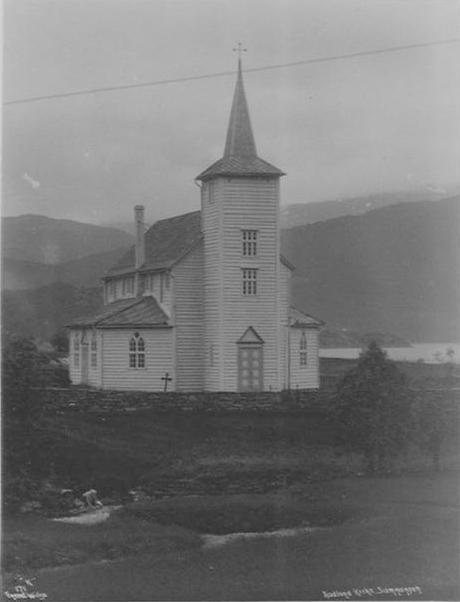
Exterior view (1912)

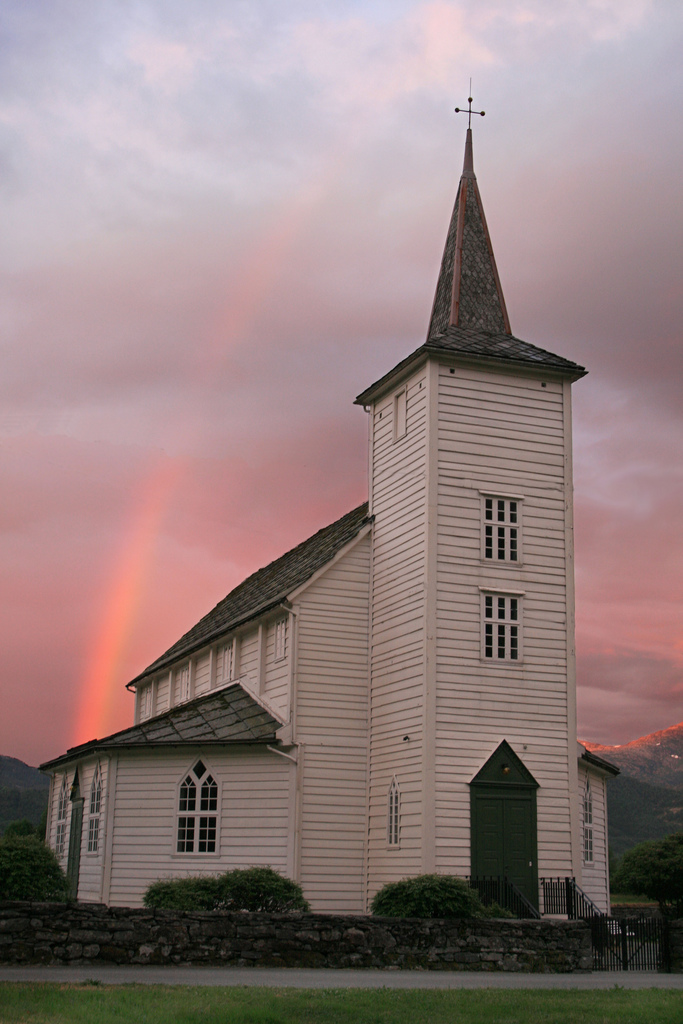
Exterior view (2007)

== See also ==
- List of churches in Bjørgvin
