= Jarle Høysæter =

Norwegian journalist

Jarle Høysæter (29 April 1933 – 28 February 2017) was a Norwegian journalist.

He was born in Samnanger Municipality. He was hired by the Norwegian Broadcasting Corporation in 1957, and went on to become a known personality in the early years of television. From 1985 to 1991 he was the head of sports operations in the European Broadcasting Union, and from 1991 to 1994 he was the head of broadcasting in the Lillehammer Olympic Organising Committee.
