= Haga, Vestland =

Village in Samnanger Municipality, Norway

Haga
- Village
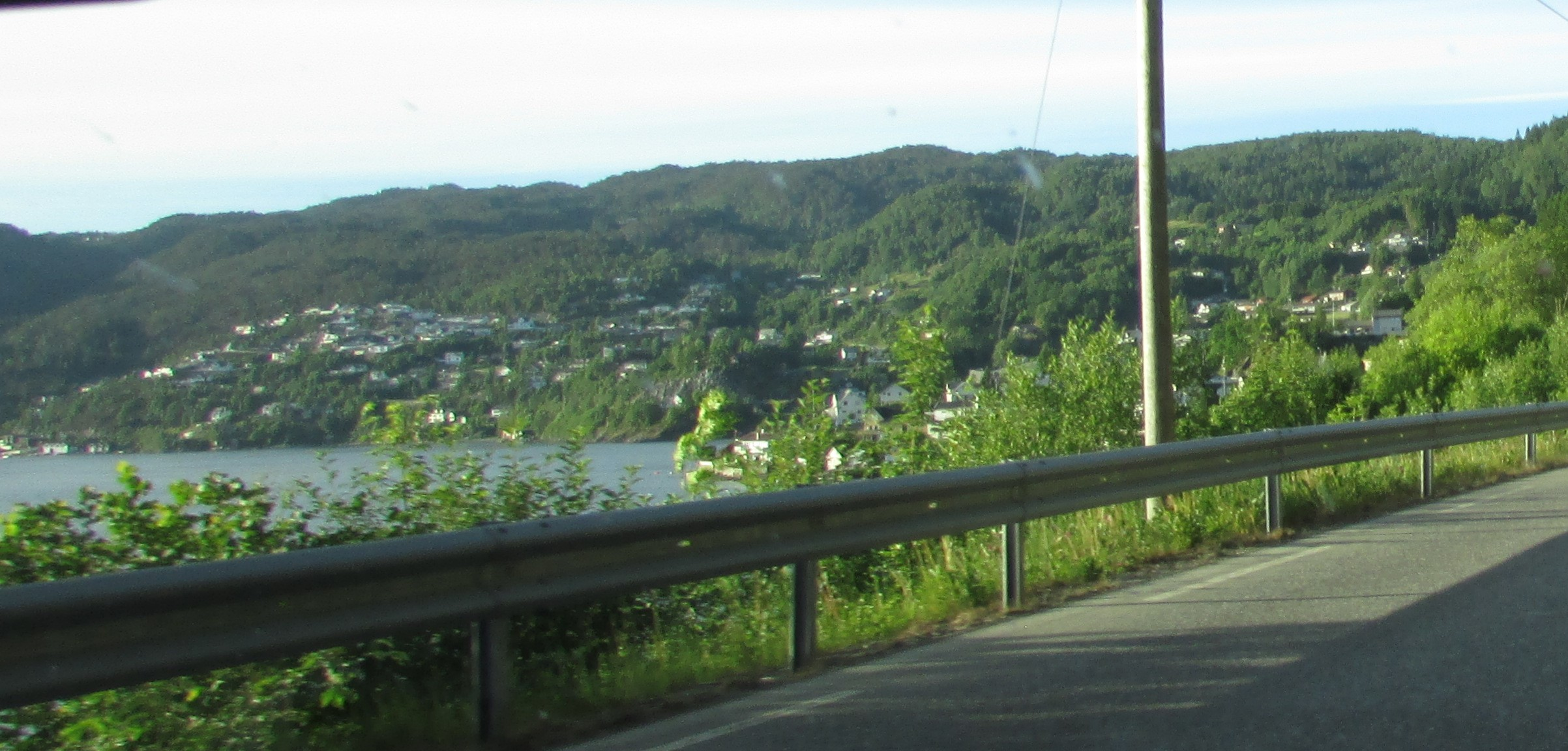
- View of the village
- Interactive map of Haga
- Coordinates: 60.38636°N 5.76695°E
- Country: Norway
- Region: Western Norway
- County: Vestland
- District: Midhordland
- Municipality: Samnanger Municipality

Area
  - Total: 0.9 km^{2} (0.35 sq mi)
- Elevation: 19 m (62 ft)

Population (2025)
  - Total: 1,074
  - Density: 1,193/km^{2} (3,090/sq mi)
- Time zone: UTC+01:00 (CET)
  - Summer (DST): UTC+02:00 (CEST)
- Post Code: 5650 Tysse

Haga is a village in Samnanger Municipality in Vestland county, Norway. The village is located the northeastern end of the Samnangerfjorden. It is located east of the village of Ådland, across the fjord. The municipal centre of Tysse lies immediately south of Haga, and it is considered part of the "urban area" of Haga. Haga Church was built in the centre of the village in 1995.

The 0.9-square-kilometre (220-acre) village area (including Tysse) has a population (2025) of 1,074 and a population density of 1,193 inhabitants per square kilometre (3,090/sq mi).
