= Ådland, Norway =

Village in Samnanger Municipality, Norway

Ådland Årland (unofficial)
- Village
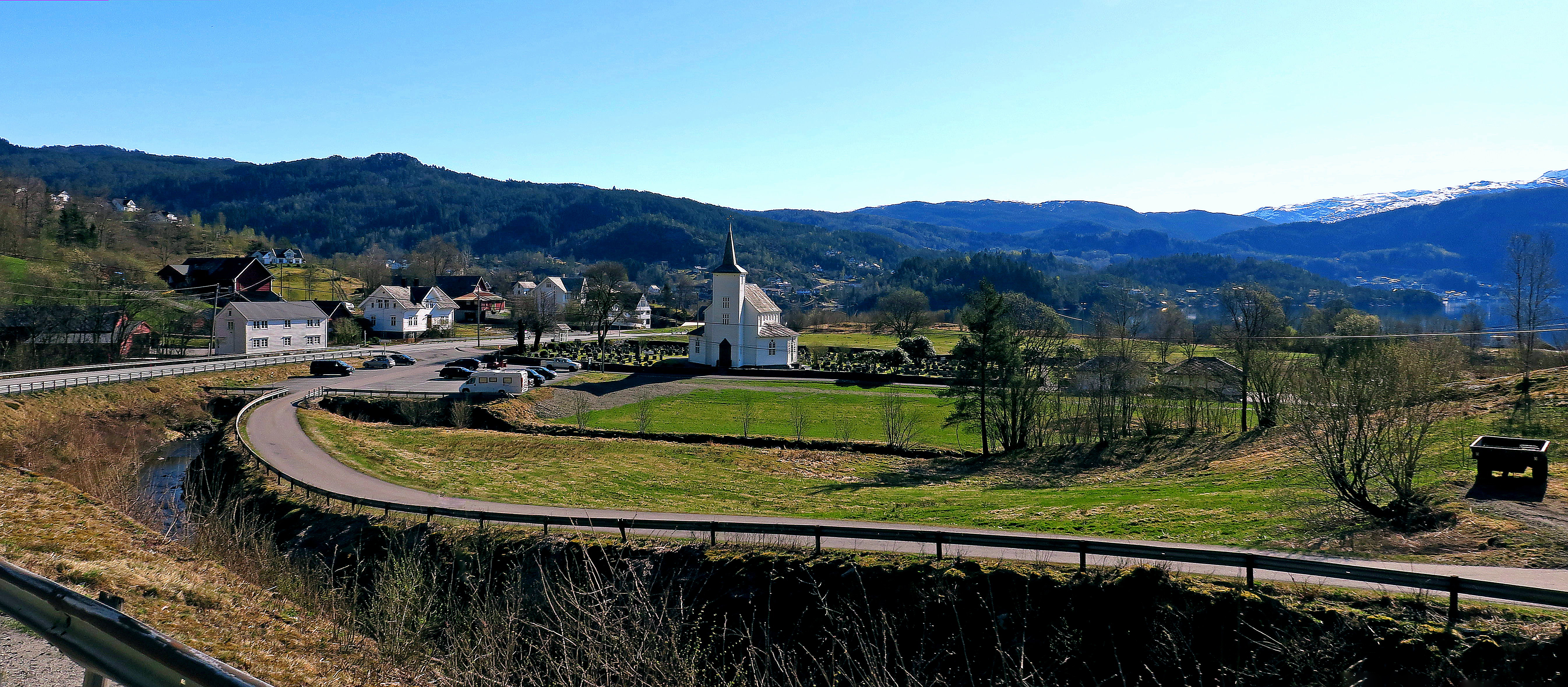
- View of the village
- Interactive map of Ådland
- Coordinates: 60.40016°N 5.71084°E
- Country: Norway
- Region: Western Norway
- County: Vestland
- District: Midhordland
- Municipality: Samnanger Municipality
- Elevation: 8 m (26 ft)
- Time zone: UTC+01:00 (CET)
  - Summer (DST): UTC+02:00 (CEST)
- Post Code: 5652 Årland

Ådland is a village in Samnanger Municipality in Vestland county, Norway. The village is located on the northeastern shore of the Samnangerfjorden, west of the village of Haga. It sits along Norwegian County Road 49, which runs from Bergen Municipality to Samnanger Municipality. Ådland Church is located in this village.

The newspaper Samningen has been published in Ådland since 1977.
