= Goutte =

Heraldic figure

A goutte is a droplet-shaped charge used in heraldry. Its name derives from the Old French for "droplet".

A goutte may be blazoned by its tincture, as in a goutte argent (literally "a silver droplet"). Alternatively, there are special names given to gouttes of various tinctures, as in a goutte d'eau (literally "a droplet of water").

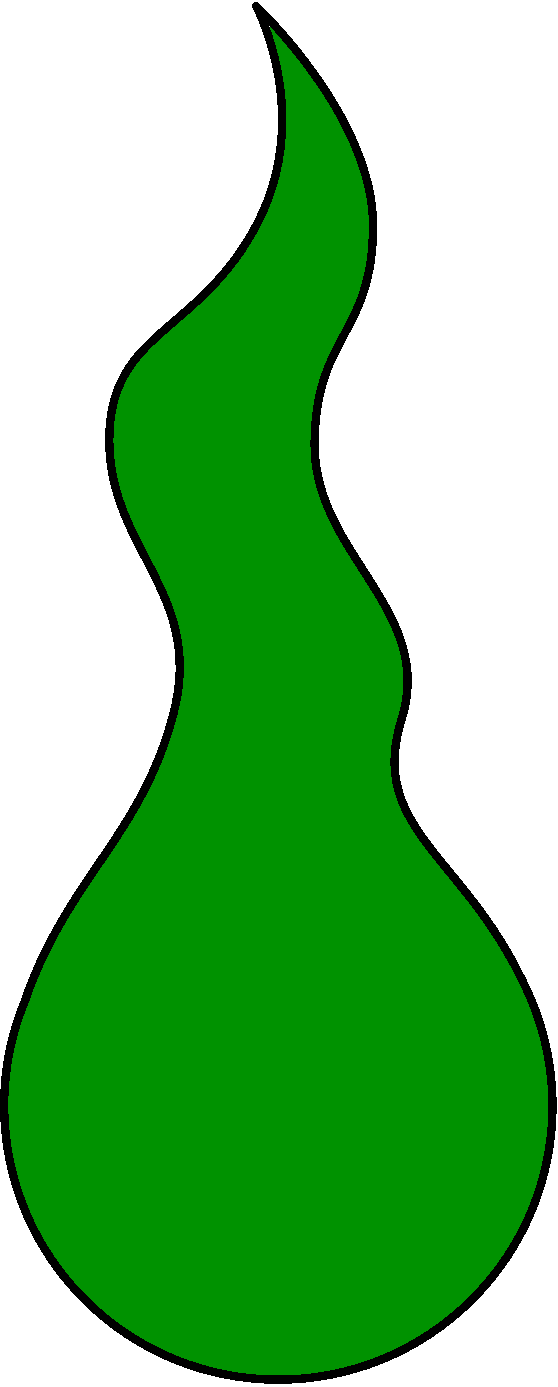
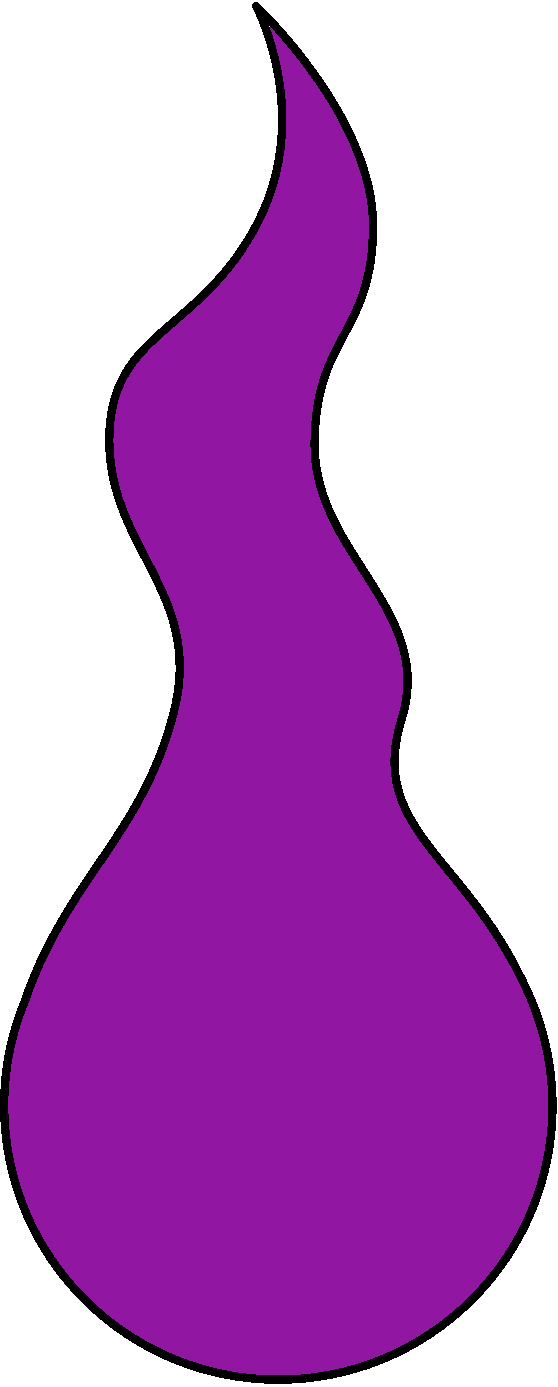
metals		colours
g. d'or of gold	g. d'eau of water	g. de larmes of tears	g. de sang of blood	g. de poix of tar	g. d'huile of (olive) oil	g. de vin of wine

In some medieval and Renaissance depictions of coats of arms, the goutte was drawn with wavy sides (as shown above). More modern depictions have smoothed the sides to make the droplets fatter and more symmetrical - as also seen in the arms on the personal seal used from 1353 by Elizabeth de Burgh, Lady of Clare, and on the 1359 seal of Clare College, Cambridge.

In their earliest uses, gouttes were semé: strewn upon the field of a coat of arms. Rather than semé de gouttes, this is termed goutty, gutté, or gutty (gouttée). It was only much later that the goutte came to be used individually in heraldry as a charge in its own right.

== See also ==
- Tincture (heraldry)
- Roundel (heraldry)
