= Fusafjorden =

Fjord in Vestland, Norway

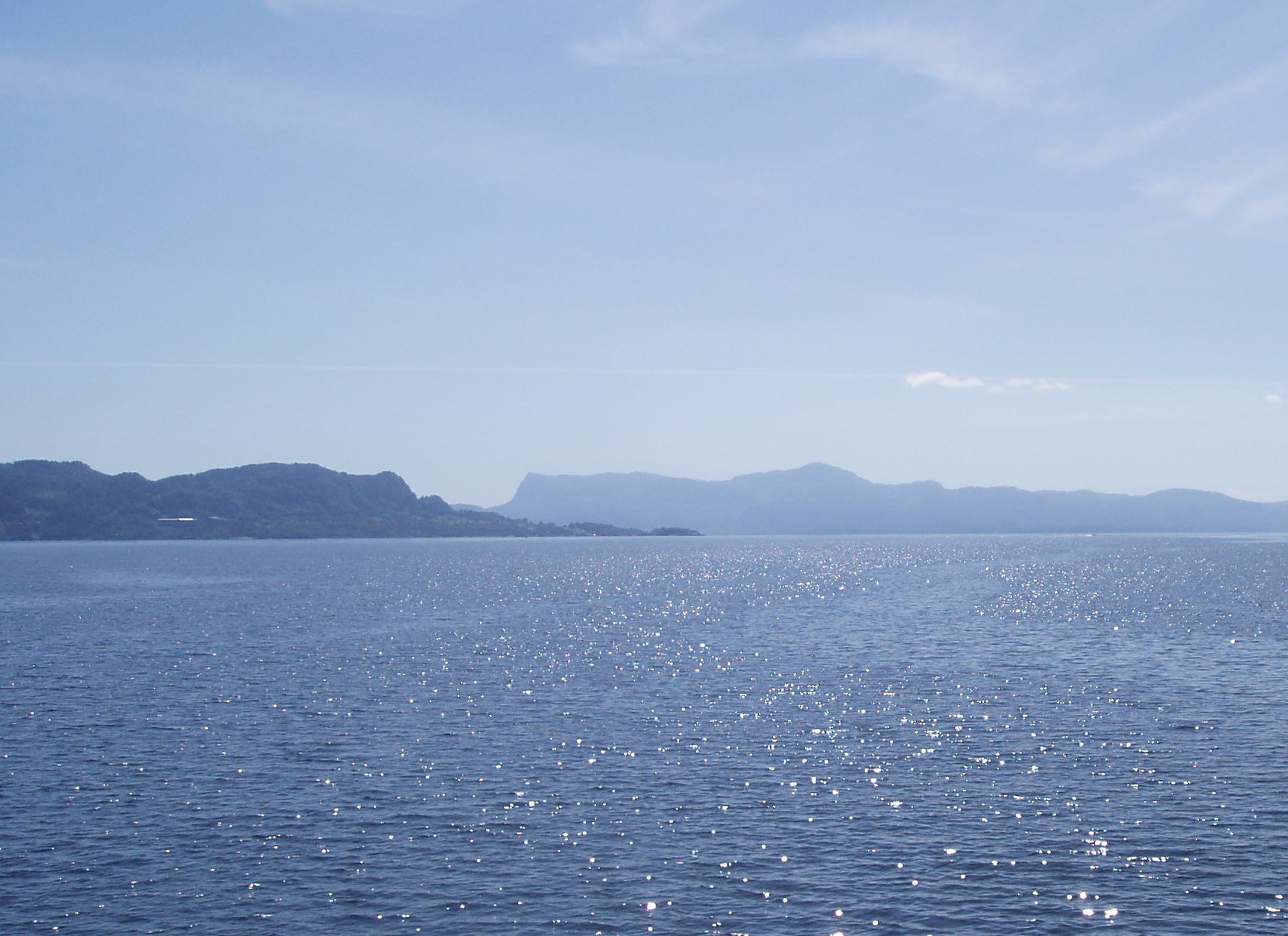
- View of the fjord
- Interactive map of Fusafjorden
- Location: Vestland county, Norway
- Coordinates: 60.19503°N 5.54705°E
- Type: Fjord
- Primary inflows: Samnangerfjorden
- Primary outflows: Bjørnafjorden
- Basin countries: Norway
- Max. length: 13 kilometres (8.1 mi)
- Settlements: Osøyro

Fusafjorden (Urban East Norwegian: [ˈfʉ̂ːsɑˌfjuːɳ]) is a fjord in Vestland county, Norway. It lies in between Bjørnafjorden Municipality and Tysnes Municipality. The 13-kilometre (8.1 mi) long fjord branches off northwards from the Bjørnafjorden at the village of Osøyro. The Fusafjorden is a wide fjord that branches into three arms at Bogøya. The three arms are Samnangerfjorden, Ådlandsfjorden, and Eikelandsfjorden.

== See also ==
- List of Norwegian fjords
