= Gullfjellet =

Mountain in Vestland, Norway

- Gullfjelltoppen
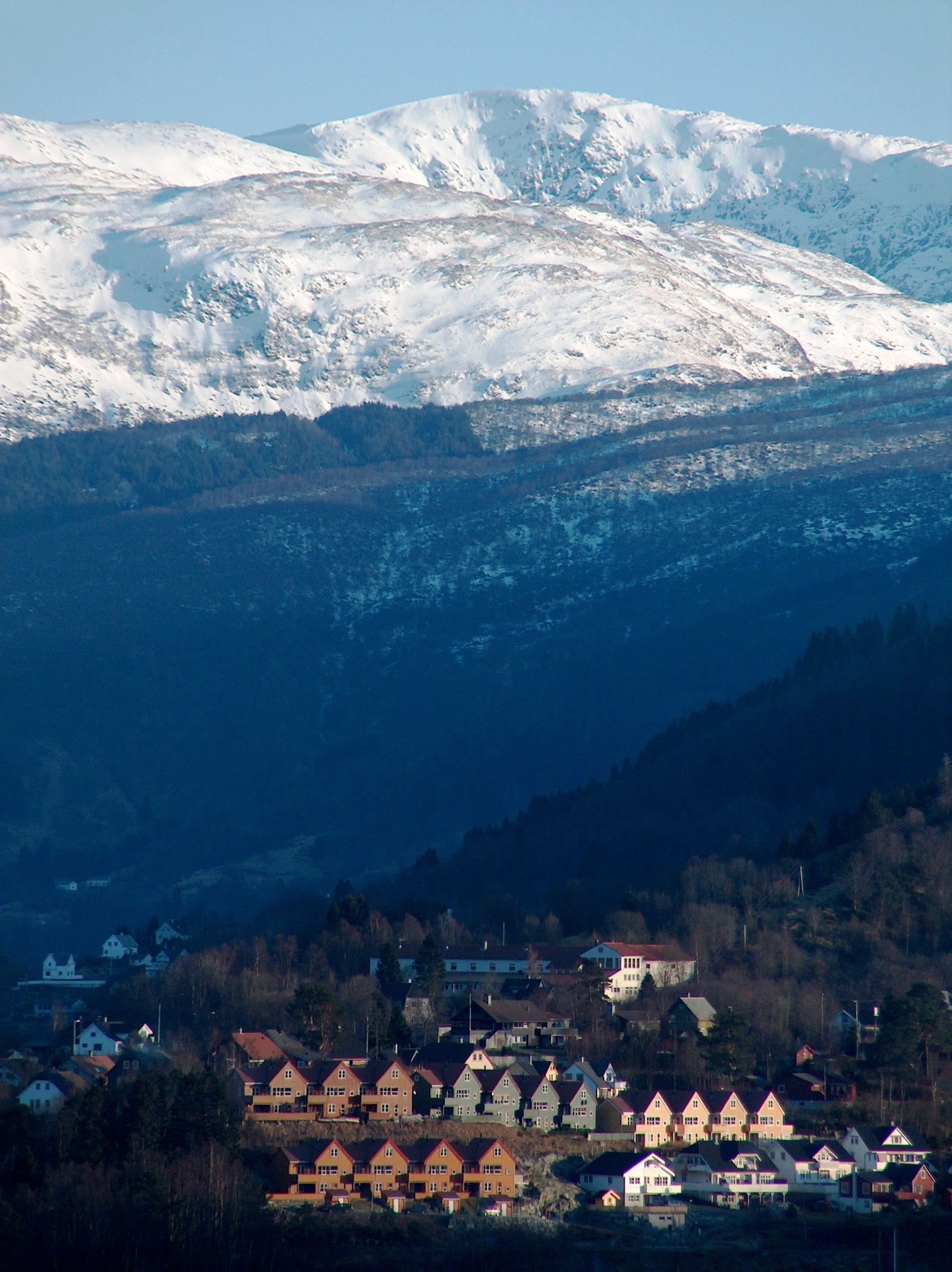
- Gullfjellet in the horizon. Garnes in front.

Highest point
- Elevation: 987 m (3,238 ft)
- Prominence: 718 m (2,356 ft)
- Isolation: 14.7 km (9.1 mi)
- Coordinates: 60°23′15″N 5°35′24″E

Geography
- Location: Vestland, Norway
- Topo map: 1215 IV Samnanger

Climbing
- Easiest route: Hiking along cairns

Gullfjellet or Gullfjelltoppen is a 987-metre (3,238 ft) tall mountain located in Vestland county, Norway. It is situated on the border between Bergen Municipality and Samnanger Municipality, and it is the highest mountain in all of Bergen Municipality. The name "Gul" is an old name for a strong wind, so the old name - Gulfjellet - means "the mountain with strong wind".

Due to its importance as a hiking attraction, and much bad weather, large and numerous cairns have been put up ("Varderekka") to guide hikers from both sides of the mountain. The watercourses on Gullfjellet supports large parts of the Bergen region with piped water.

The lake Svartavatnet is situated 400 metres (1,300 ft) to the west of the mountain. The mountain Hausdalshorga is located to the southwest of this mountain.

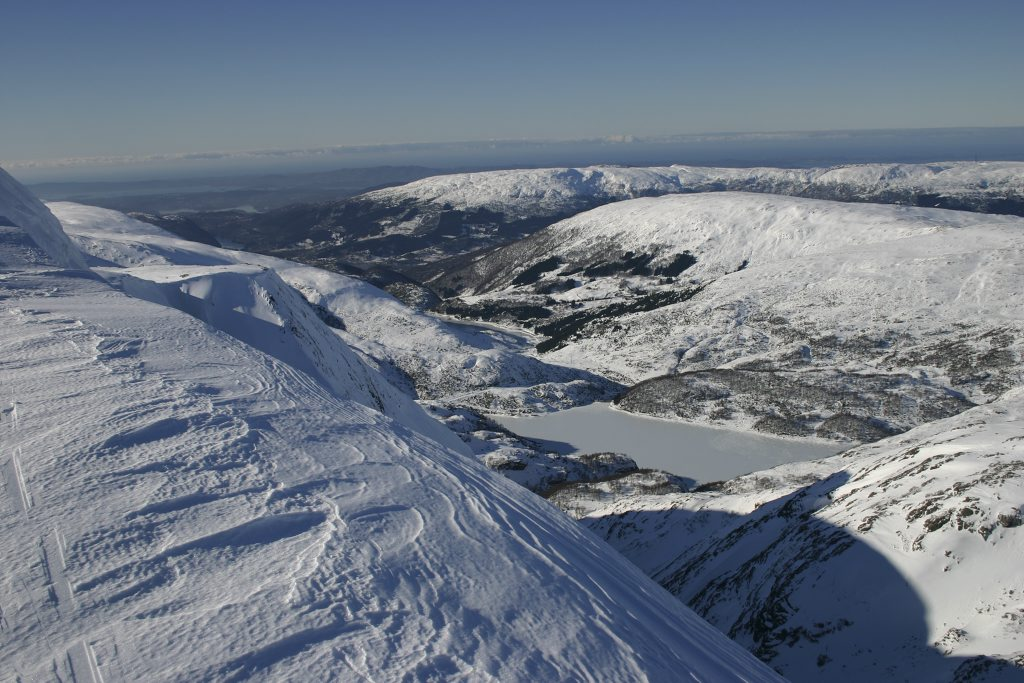
View from Gullfjellet.

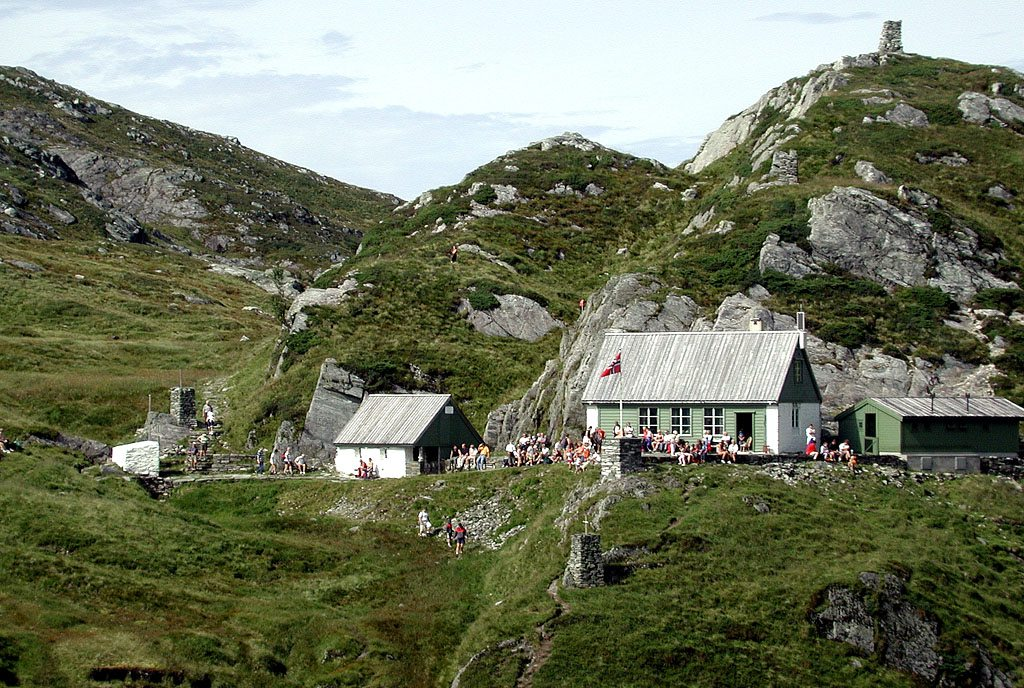
Redningshytten at Gullfjellet.

== Climate ==
Climate data for Gullfjellet (345 m, extremes 2016-)
Month	Jan	Feb	Mar	Apr	May	Jun	Jul	Aug	Sep	Oct	Nov	Dec	Year
Record high °C (°F)	10.0 (50.0)	11.6 (52.9)	12.4 (54.3)	19.6 (67.3)	28.5 (83.3)	26.9 (80.4)	31.0 (87.8)	26.2 (79.2)	27.3 (81.1)	19.8 (67.6)	18.1 (64.6)	10.9 (51.6)	31.0 (87.8)
Daily mean °C (°F)	0.0 (32.0)	−0.3 (31.5)	0.6 (33.1)	4.0 (39.2)	7.8 (46.0)	11.1 (52.0)	13.0 (55.4)	13.0 (55.4)	10.1 (50.2)	5.9 (42.6)	2.7 (36.9)	0.6 (33.1)	5.7 (42.3)
Record low °C (°F)	−16.3 (2.7)	−17.3 (0.9)	−19.6 (−3.3)	−11.9 (10.6)	−4.4 (24.1)	0.8 (33.4)	1.6 (34.9)	2.8 (37.0)	−0.8 (30.6)	−6.4 (20.5)	−12.1 (10.2)	−14.1 (6.6)	−19.6 (−3.3)
Average precipitation mm (inches)	464 (18.3)	355 (14.0)	317 (12.5)	210 (8.3)	175 (6.9)	196 (7.7)	259 (10.2)	345 (13.6)	347 (13.7)	409 (16.1)	482 (19.0)	509 (20.0)	4,068 (160.3)
Source: yr.no/Norwegian Meteorological Institute

== See also ==
- List of mountains of Norway
