= Tysnes =

Tysnes may refer to:

== Places ==
- Tysnes Municipality, a municipality in Vestland county, Norway
- Tysnesøya (sometimes referred to as Tysnes), an island in Vestland county, Norway
- Tysnes Church, a church in Tysnes Municipality in Vestland county, Norway

== Other ==
- Tysnes (newspaper), a newspaper serving part of Vestland county, Norway
- MF Tysnes, a car and passenger ferry in operation on the Hardangerfjord in Norway
