= Onarheim Church =

Church in Vestland, Norway

- Onarheim kirke
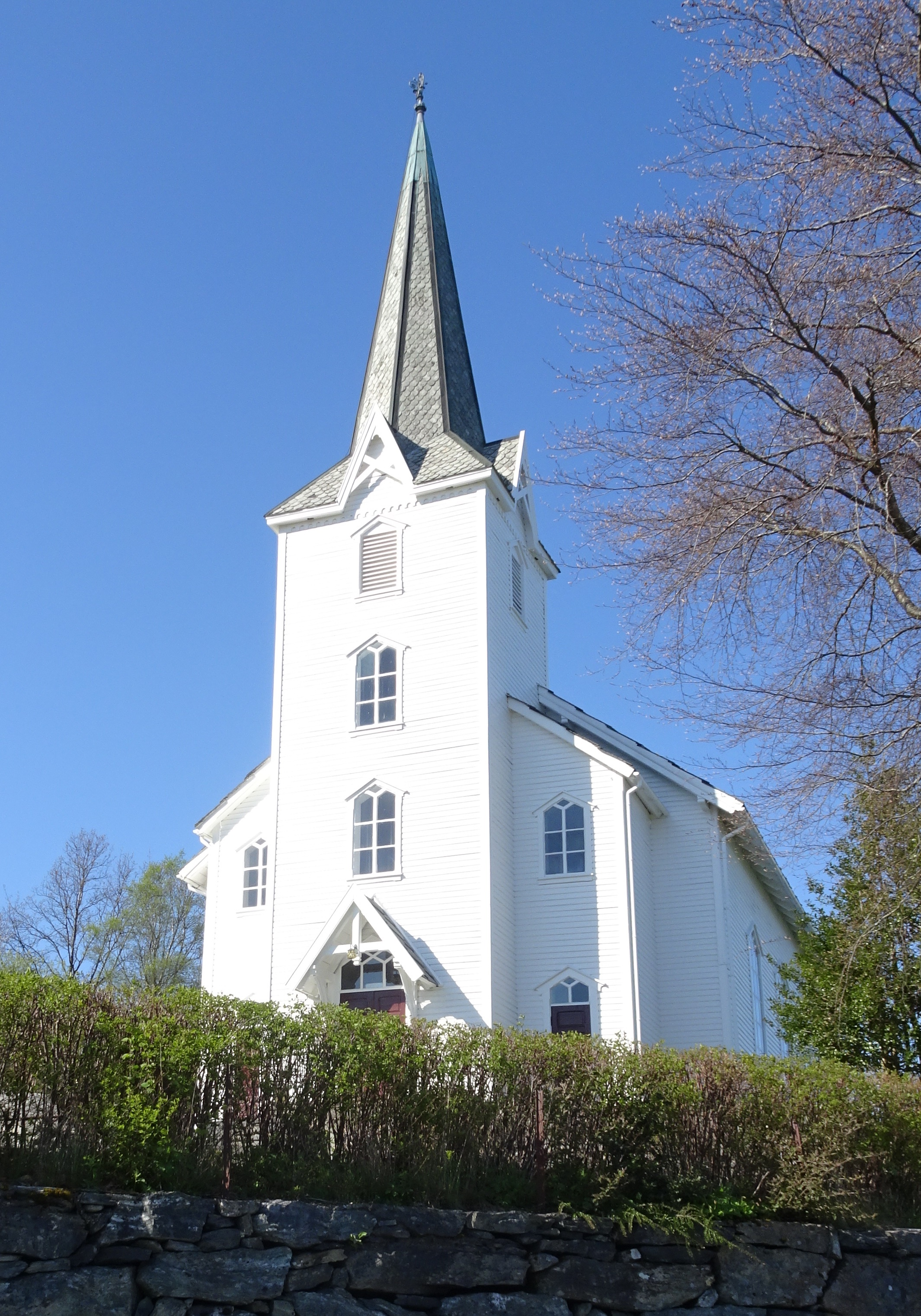
- View of the church
- Onarheim Church
- 59°56′49″N 5°37′38″E
- Location: Tysnes Municipality, Vestland
- Country: Norway
- Denomination: Church of Norway
- Previous denomination: Catholic Church
- Churchmanship: Evangelical Lutheran

History
- Status: Parish church
- Founded: 12th century
- Consecrated: 7 July 1893

Architecture
- Functional status: Active
- Architect: Karl Askeland
- Architectural type: Long church
- Completed: 1893 (133 years ago)

Specifications
- Capacity: 500
- Materials: Wood

Administration
- Diocese: Bjørgvin bispedømme
- Deanery: Sunnhordland prosti
- Parish: Onarheim
- Norwegian Cultural Heritage Site
- Type: Church
- Status: Listed
- ID: 85219

Onarheim Church (Norwegian: Onarheim kirke) is a parish church of the Church of Norway in Tysnes Municipality in Vestland county, Norway. It is located in the village of Onarheim on the southeastern side of the island of Tysnesøya. It is the church for the Onarheim parish which is part of the Sunnhordland prosti (deanery) in the Diocese of Bjørgvin. The white, wooden church was built in a long church design in 1893 using plans drawn up by the architect Karl Askeland from Radøy. The church seats about 500 people.

== History ==
The earliest existing historical records of the church date back to the year 1327, but the church was not new that year. The first church at Onarheim was a stone church that was probably built in the late 1100s. The church had a rectangular (nearly square) nave that measured about 11.9 by 10 metres (39 ft × 33 ft) and a narrower, rectangular chancel. At some point before 1686, the old stone chancel was torn down and replaced with a new wooden chancel on the same location. The church was sold into private ownership in 1723. In 1819–1820, the church was in disrepair, so it was completely renovated and rebuilt. The entire stone nave was demolished and rebuilt and the choir was heavily renovated. In 1862, Tysnes Municipality bought back the church from private ownership. As the population of the parish increased, the church eventually became too small, so in 1893, the whole church was torn down and a new wooden long church was built on the same site. The new church was consecrated on 7 July 1893 by the Bishop Fredrik Waldemar Hvoslef.

== See also ==
- List of churches in Bjørgvin
