= Uggdal Church =

Church in Vestland, Norway

- Uggdal kyrkje
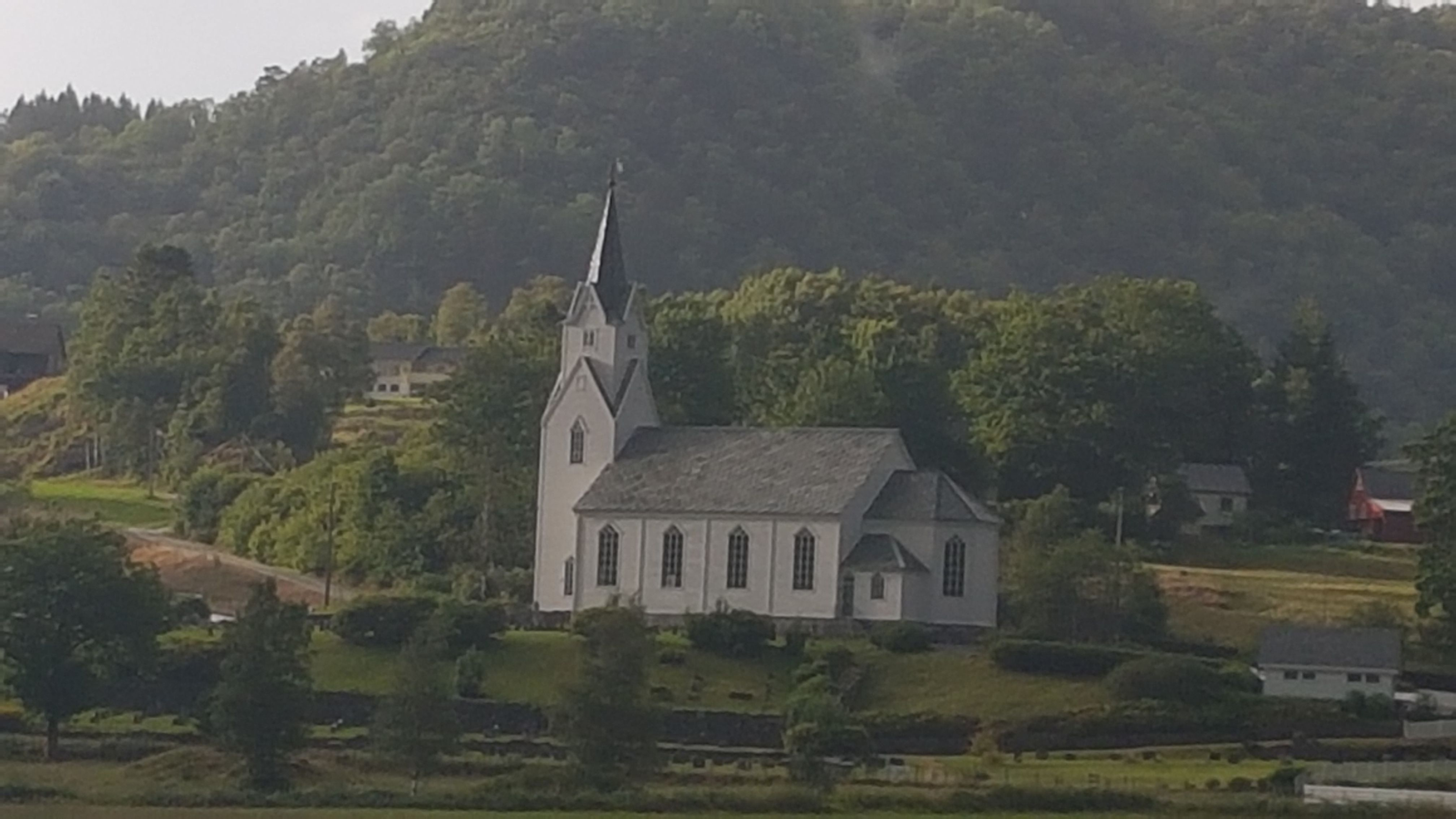
- View of the church
- Uggdal Church
- 60°00′31″N 5°29′54″E
- Location: Tysnes Municipality, Vestland
- Country: Norway
- Denomination: Church of Norway
- Previous denomination: Catholic Church
- Churchmanship: Evangelical Lutheran

History
- Former name: Opdal kirke
- Status: Parish church
- Founded: 13th century
- Consecrated: 31 May 1876

Architecture
- Functional status: Active
- Architect: Ole Vangberg
- Architectural type: Long church
- Completed: 1876 (150 years ago)

Specifications
- Capacity: 650
- Materials: Wood

Administration
- Diocese: Bjørgvin bispedømme
- Deanery: Sunnhordland prosti
- Parish: Reksteren og Uggdal
- Norwegian Cultural Heritage Site
- Type: Church
- Status: Not protected
- ID: 85710

Uggdal Church (Norwegian: Uggdal kyrkje) is a parish church of the Church of Norway in Tysnes Municipality in Vestland county, Norway. It is located in the village of Uggdal on the large island of Tysnesøya. It is one of the two churches for the "Reksteren og Uggdal" parish which is part of the Sunnhordland prosti (deanery) in the Diocese of Bjørgvin. The white, wooden church was built in a long church design in 1876 using plans drawn up by the architect Ole Vangberg. The church seats about 650 people.

== History ==
The earliest existing historical records of the church date back to the year 1288, but it wasn't new that year. The first church here was a wooden stave church that was likely built during the 13th century. Originally, the church was called Opdal Church until 1933. It was located a few meters to the southwest of the present church site. Not much is known about this building. Around the year 1630, the old church was torn down and a new timber-framed long church was built on the same site. In 1696–1698, major work was done at the church. The work included, among other things, a new tower and roof on the church. Aschild Tebstad and Johannes Rachnes led this renovation. In 1721, the church was damaged in a storm, and again in 1774, the church was heavily damaged by a lightning strike. On 7 October 1874, the parish received permission to construct a new church. The parish used plans by Ole Vangberg for the nearby Os Church for the new church. In 1876, a new church was built immediately to the northeast of the church. After its completion, the old church was torn down. The new church was consecrated on 31 May 1876 by the Bishop Peter Hersleb Graah Birkeland.

== See also ==
- List of churches in Bjørgvin
