= Onarheim =

Village in Tysnes Municipality, Norway

- Village
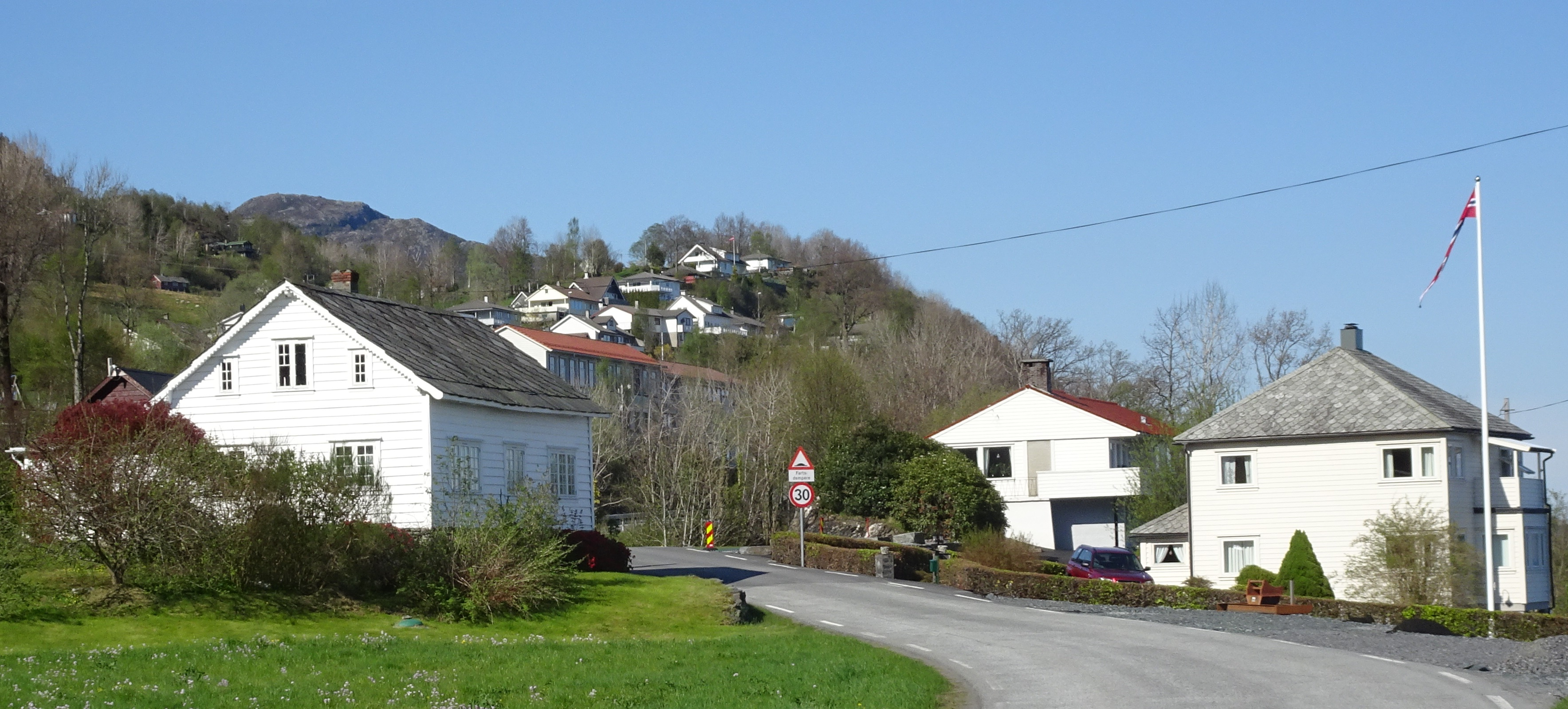
- View of Onarheim
- Interactive map of Onarheim
- Coordinates: 59.94702°N 5.62803°E
- Country: Norway
- Region: Western Norway
- County: Vestland
- District: Sunnhordland
- Municipality: Tysnes Municipality
- Elevation: 9 m (30 ft)
- Time zone: UTC+01:00 (CET)
  - Summer (DST): UTC+02:00 (CEST)
- Post Code: 5694 Onarheim

Onarheim is a village in Tysnes Municipality in Vestland county, Norway. The village is located on the southeastern shores of the island of Tysnesøya, along the Hardangerfjorden. The village has been home to a church since the 12th century. The present Onarheim Church was built in 1893, and it serves the southeastern part of the municipality. There is also a small school in Onarheim.

== History ==
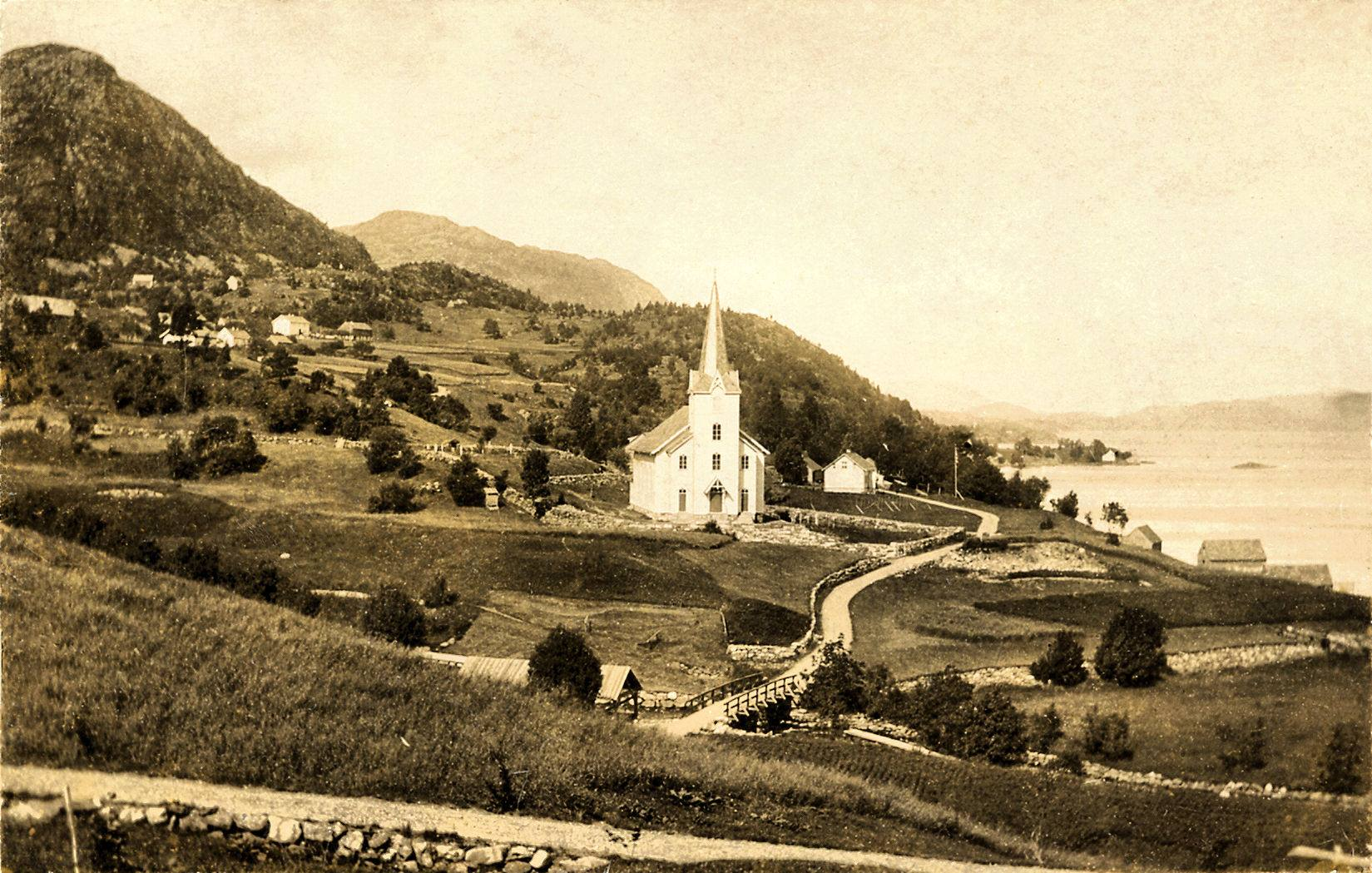
View of Onarheim in 1895

The farm at Onarheim has been a seat farm for centuries. In the 12th century, Erling Skakke held a thing here. In the Middle Ages, the so-called Olavsgildet (Onarheimsgildet) was held here. It was a meeting which gathered participants from the entire county at Onarheim.

In the first half of the 16th century, the farm belonged to the lord of Bakke monastery, Jørgen Pedersen Staur, and then his daughter Bodil. The farm lost its seat farm rights when she married under her estate, but the rights were renewed in 1630 when the farm was taken over by Bertel Lauritsen Hørby. After him, his widow Anna took over and then her brother Iver Mund, who sold it to Axel Mowat. Upon his death in 1661, Onarheim came into the possession of his son-in-law, Baron Ludvig Rosenkrantz. His heirs sold it to the general customs administrator Johan Garmann. The farm was divided after his death in 1730, and again lost its seat farm rights. Since then, the farm area has grown up into a small village.
