= Langenuen =

Strait in Vestland, Norway

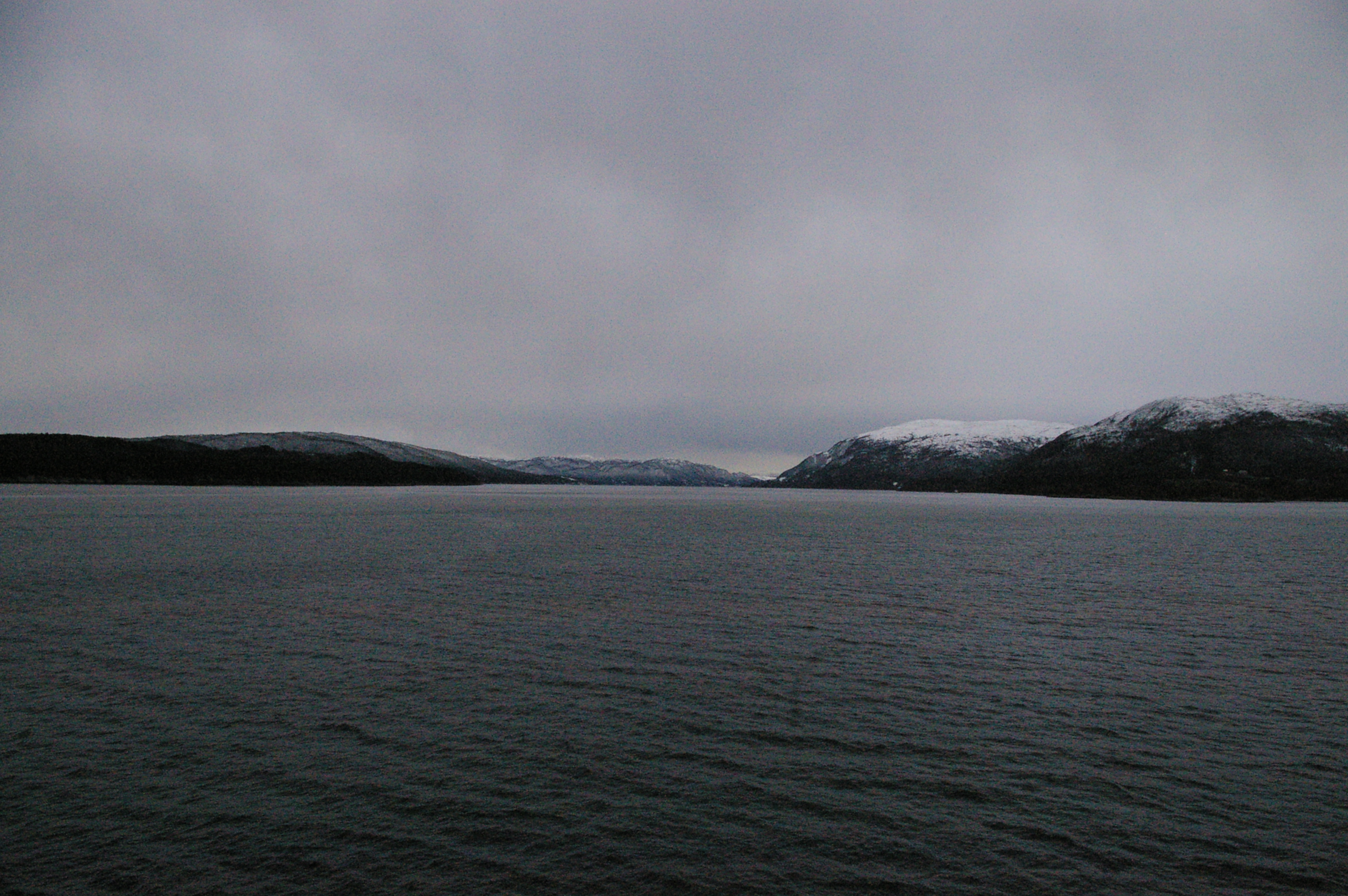
- View of Langenuen, seen from Selbjørnsfjorden
- Interactive map of Langenuen
- Location: Vestland county, Norway
- Coordinates: 59.93859°N 5.46695°E
- Type: Strait
- Primary inflows: Bjørnafjorden
- Primary outflows: Hardangerfjorden
- Basin countries: Norway
- Max. length: 40 kilometres (25 mi)
- Max. width: 1 to 4 km (0.62 to 2.49 mi)

Langenuen is a strait in Vestland county, Norway. The 40-kilometre (25 mi) strait runs between the islands of Stord and Huftarøy on the west, and Tysnesøya and Reksteren on the east. The strait ranges from 1 to 4 kilometres (0.62 to 2.49 mi) wide, and it forms the boundaries between Austevoll Municipality, Tysnes Municipality, Fitjar Municipality, and Stord Municipality.
