= Uggdal =

Village in Tysnes Municipality, Norway

Uggdal Uggdalseidet
- Village
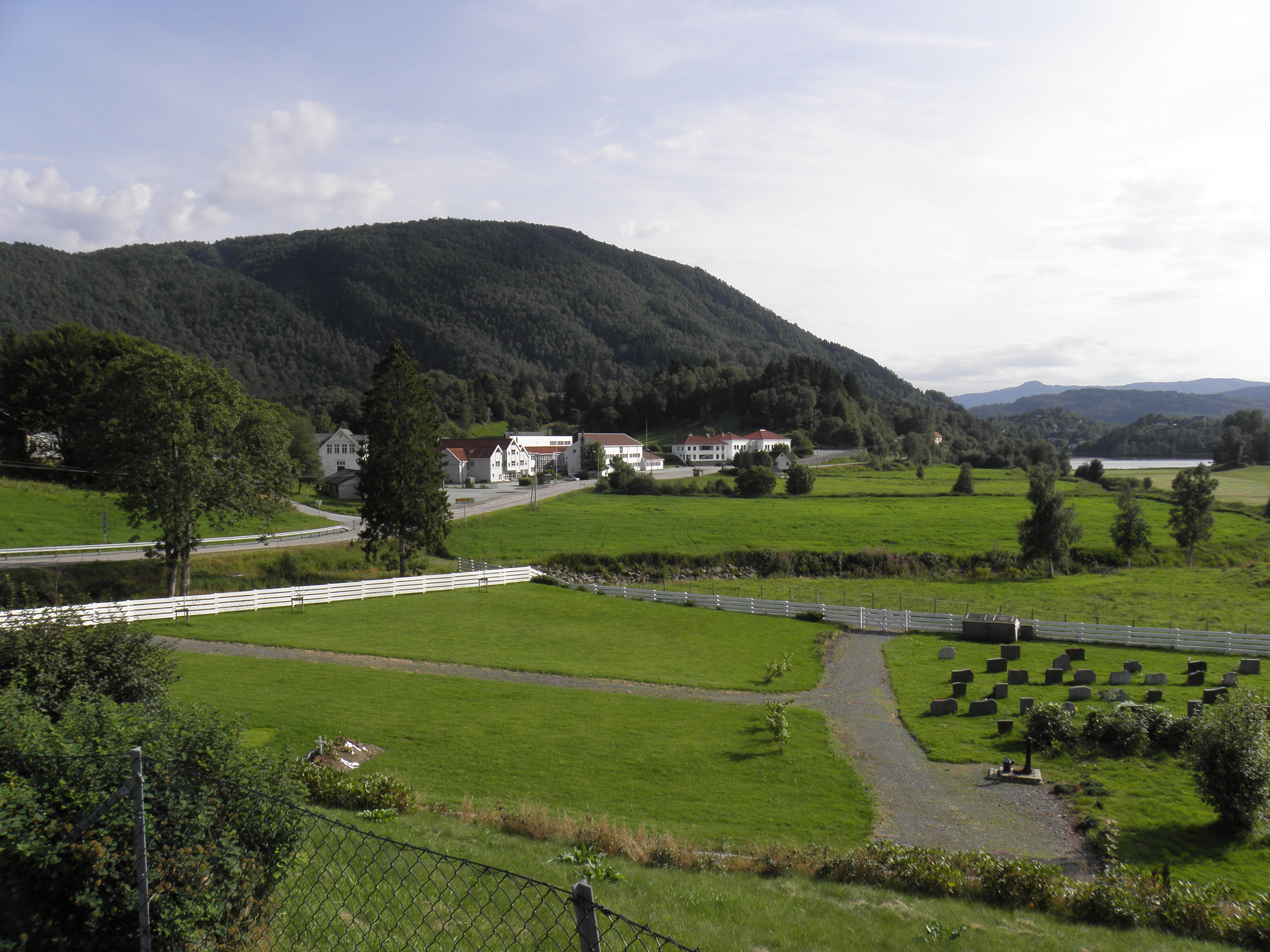
- View of Uggdal showing the administrative buildings and others
- Interactive map of the village
- Coordinates: 59.99736°N 5.49447°E
- Country: Norway
- Region: Western Norway
- County: Vestland
- District: Sunnhordland
- Municipality: Tysnes Municipality

Area
  - Total: 0.4 km^{2} (0.15 sq mi)
- Elevation: 24 m (79 ft)

Population (2023)
  - Total: 296
  - Density: 740/km^{2} (1,900/sq mi)
- Time zone: UTC+01:00 (CET)
  - Summer (DST): UTC+02:00 (CEST)
- Post Code: 5685 Uggdal

Uggdal or Uggdalseidet is the administrative centre of Tysnes Municipality in Vestland county, Norway. The village is located on the west side of the island of Tysnesøya. The village is located in the northern part of the Uggdalsdalen valley near the western coast. The village of Våge lies about 4 kilometres (2.5 mi) north of Uggdal.

The 0.4-square-kilometre (99-acre) village had a population (2023) of 296 and a population density of 740 inhabitants per square kilometre (1,900/sq mi). Since 2023, the population and area data for this village area has not been separately tracked by Statistics Norway since the village is no longer considered large enough to be an urban settlement.

The southern part of the village is a small residential area known as Uggdalseidet and the northern part of the village is known as Uggdal. Uggdal is the site of the municipal administration, a doctor's office, the local fire and police stations, as well as a school. Uggdal Church is also located in the village, serving the southwestern part of the island of Tysnesøya.
