= Reksteren Church =

Church in Vestland, Norway

- Reksteren kyrkje
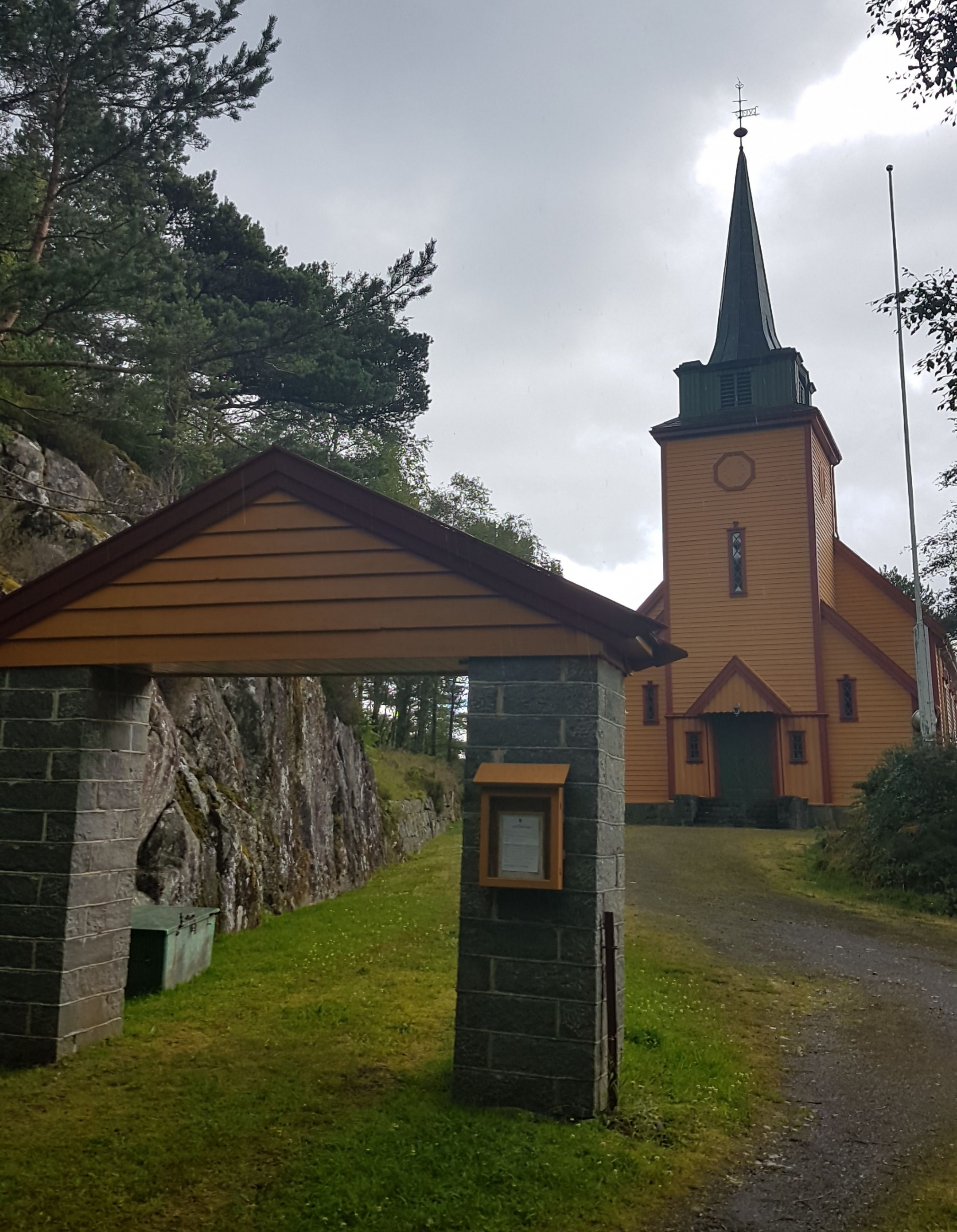
- View of the church
- Reksteren Church
- 60°02′25″N 5°26′04″E
- Location: Tysnes Municipality, Vestland
- Country: Norway
- Denomination: Church of Norway
- Churchmanship: Evangelical Lutheran

History
- Former name: Reksteren kapell
- Status: Parish church
- Founded: 1937
- Consecrated: 28 Jan 1937

Architecture
- Functional status: Active
- Architect: Torgeir Alvsaker
- Architectural type: Long church
- Completed: 1937 (89 years ago)

Specifications
- Capacity: 250
- Materials: Wood

Administration
- Diocese: Bjørgvin bispedømme
- Deanery: Sunnhordland prosti
- Parish: Reksteren og Uggdal
- Norwegian Cultural Heritage Site
- Type: Church
- Status: Listed
- ID: 85286

Reksteren Church (Norwegian: Reksteren kirke) is a parish church of the Church of Norway in Tysnes Municipality in Vestland county, Norway. It is located in the small village of Bruntveit on the island of Reksteren. It is one of the two churches for the "Reksteren og Uggdal" parish which is part of the Sunnhordland prosti (deanery) in the Diocese of Bjørgvin. The gold-colored, wooden church was built in a long church design in 1937 using plans drawn up by the architect Torgeir Alvsaker. The church seats about 250 people.

== History ==
The people of the island of Reksteren received permission to build their own chapel during the 1930s. Torgeir Alvsaker was hired to design the new building and Jakob Molvik was hired as the lead builder. The foundation stone was built into the foundation wall on the east side of the choir on 17 May 1936. Construction of the chapel took place in 1936-1937. It was consecrated on 28 January 1937 by the Bishop Andreas Fleischer. Originally, it was titled as a chapel, but later it was upgraded to the status of parish church.

== See also ==
- List of churches in Bjørgvin
