= Reksteren =

Island in Vestland, Norway

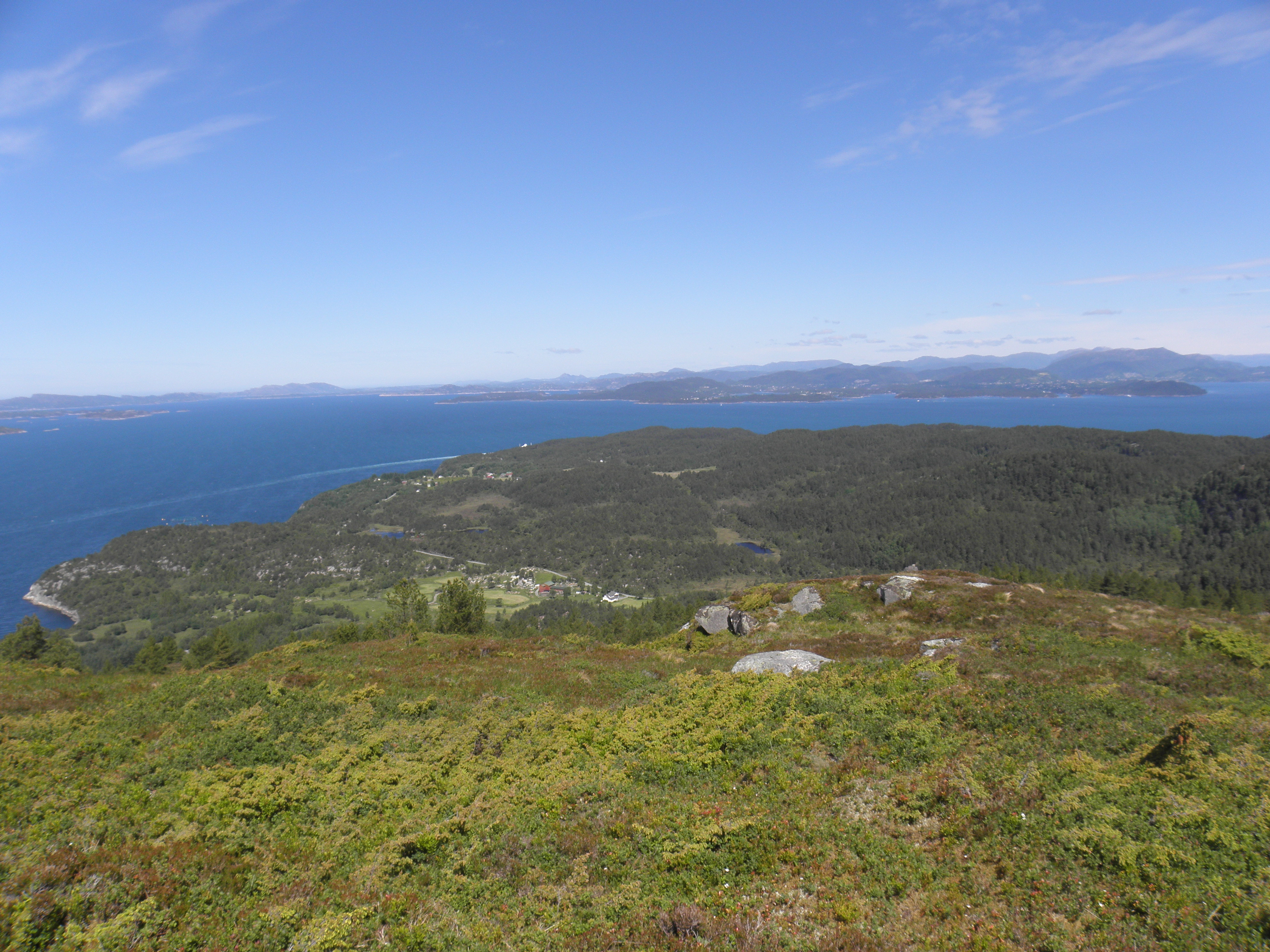
- View of the island from Gjøvågsvarden, looking north
- Interactive map of the island

Geography
- Location: Vestland, Norway
- Coordinates: 60.0384°N 5.3929°E
- Area: 37.2 km^{2} (14.4 sq mi)
- Length: 10 km (6 mi)
- Width: 5.6 km (3.48 mi)
- Highest elevation: 336 m (1102 ft)
- Highest point: Bjørnkletten

Administration
- Norway
- County: Vestland
- Municipality: Tysnes Municipality

Reksteren is an island in Tysnes Municipality in Vestland county, Norway. The island covers an area of 37.2 square kilometres (14.4 sq mi). Its highest point is the 336-metre (1,102 ft) tall Bjørnkletten. The island lies northwest of the larger island of Tysnesøya. The small Bårdsundet strait separates the two islands and there is a road bridge connecting the two islands. The Langenuen strait runs along the west side of the island and the Bjørnafjorden lies along the north side of the island. The village of Gjøvåg lies along the western coast of the island and Reksteren Church is located along the eastern shore.

== See also ==
- List of islands of Norway
