= Magnus Aarbakke =

Norwegian judge (1934–2025)

Magnus Aarbakke (14 October 1934 – 11 June 2025) was a Norwegian judge.

== Life and career ==
Aarbakke was born in Tysnes Municipality in Hordaland county on 14 October 1934. He took the Dr.juris degree in 1967 for the thesis Virksomhetsbegrepet i norsk skatterett, and was a professor at the University of Oslo from 1968 to 1990. He specialized in commercial law, and was among the editors of the journal Tidsskrift for rettsvitenskap between 1974 and 2001. After leaving the professorship he worked as a lawyer for some years, and then served as a Supreme Court Justice from 1994 to 2002. He was a member of the Norwegian Academy of Science and Letters. On 31 May 1996, Aarbakke received an honorary doctorate from the Faculty of Law at Uppsala University, Sweden.

Aarbakke died in Asker Municipality in Akershus county on 11 June 2025, at the age of 90.
