= Seat farm =

Scandinavian farm where a nobleman resided

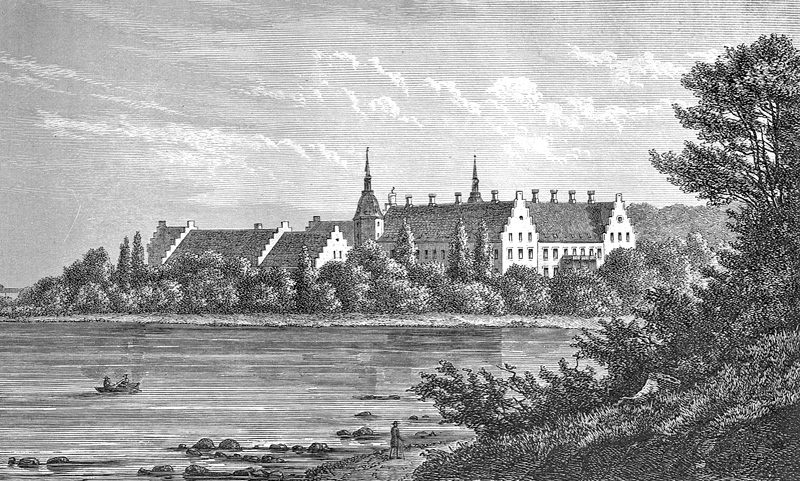
The seat farm Holsteinborg in Denmark. Artist: Jens Peter Trap (ca. 1860)

In Scandinavia, a seat farm or manor farm (Danish: sædegård; Norwegian setegård/setegard; Swedish: sätesgård or säteri; Finnish: säteritila) was a farm where a nobleman had his permanent residence. They were found in the Kingdom of Denmark, the Kingdom of Norway, the Kingdom of Sweden, and Finland, and enjoyed certain privileges.

== Norway ==
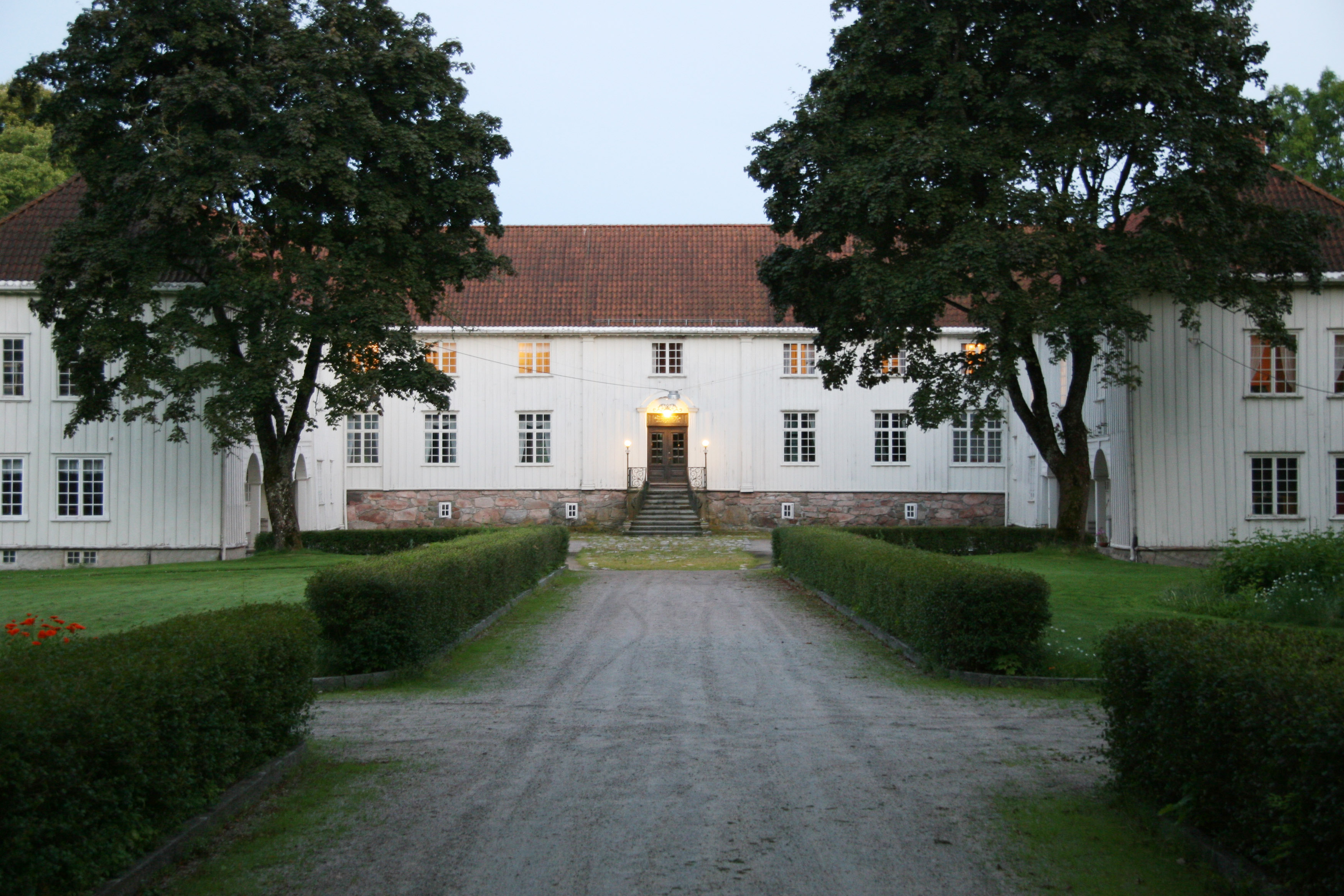
Elingård Farm in Norway. The earliest known owner was Olav Torsteinsson (Gyldenhorn) in the 15th century

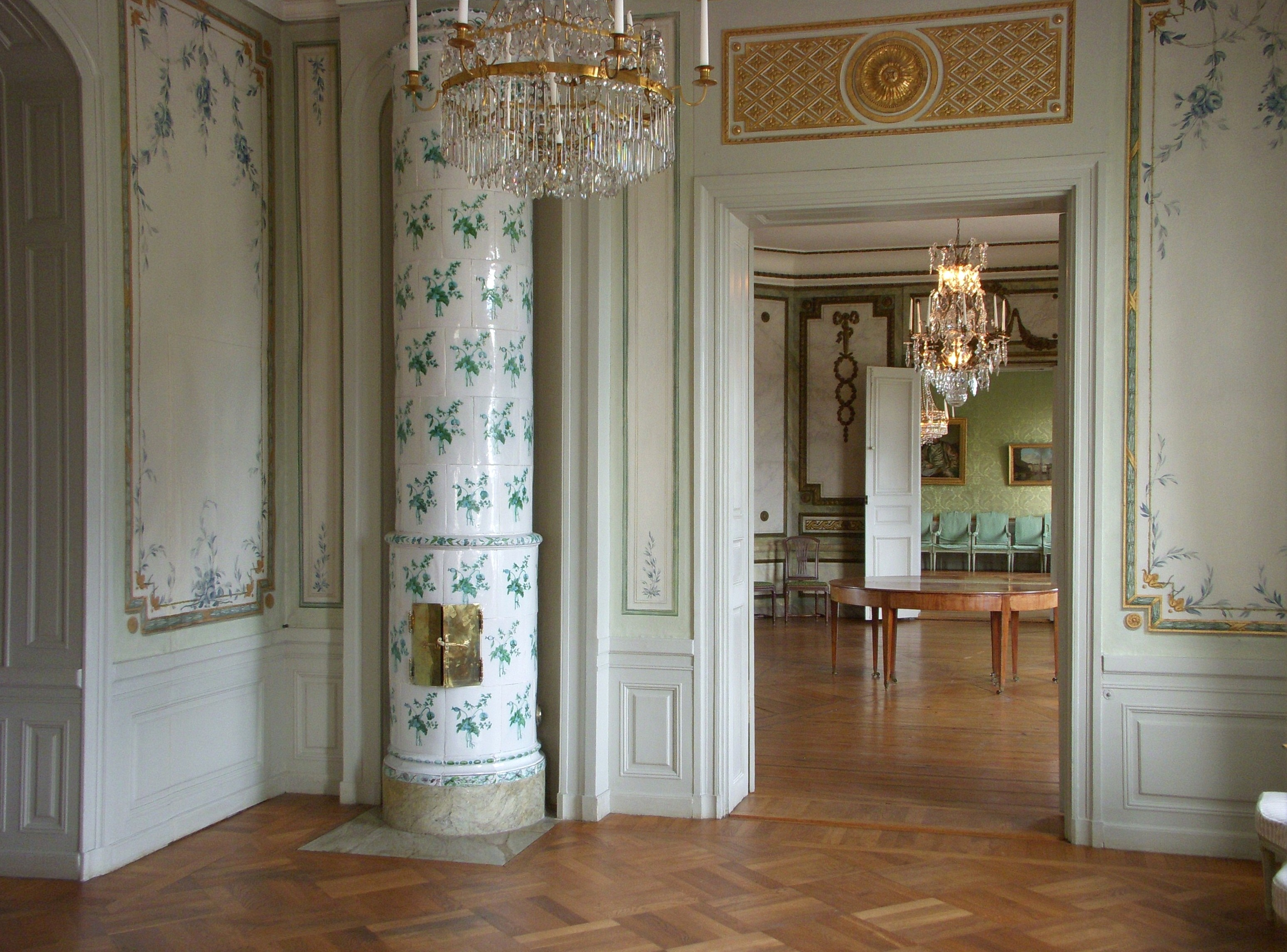
Interior of the manor at Sturehov in Sweden

The term was originally used for any farm where a nobleman chose to reside. In 1639 the status of seat farm was restricted to farms that for at least the previous forty years had enjoyed this status. After 1660, when absolute monarchy was introduced in Norway, non-noble persons could also achieve this status for their farm of residence.

Seat farms had, especially, freedom from taxes and tithes. After 1800 the tax exemption was modified, and under the 1821 Nobility Law the exemption ended upon the death of the person owning the farm at the time of the law's enactment.

- Approximate number of seat farms in 1639: 100
- Approximate number of seat farms in 1821: 25

== List of Seat farms in Norway ==
Name	Place	Seat farm privileges	House	Ref.
Akselvoll	Nordhordland	Before the introduction of the absolutism in 1660.	1648 Mowat 1661 Bildt	
Ask	Askøy Municipality	Before the introduction of the absolutism in 1660.		
Austrått	Ørland Municipality			
Berby	Halden Municipality			
Bertnes	Bodø Municipality	Before the introduction of the absolutism in 1660.		
Biltsgård		Before the introduction of the absolutism in 1660.	1648 Mowat 1661 Bildt	
Birkesvoll		Before the introduction of the absolutism in 1660.		
Bjelland	Sunnhordland	Before the introduction of the absolutism in 1660.		
Bleken		Before the introduction of the absolutism in 1660.		
Borregård	Sarpsborg Municipality	Before the introduction of the absolutism in 1660.		
Brandstorp	Sarpsborg Municipality	Before the introduction of the absolutism in 1660.		
Brunla	Larvik Municipality	Before the introduction of the absolutism in 1660.		
Disen	Hamar Municipality	Before the introduction of the absolutism in 1660.		
Dønnes	Dønna Municipality	Before the introduction of the absolutism in 1660.		
Eide	Sunnhordland	Before the introduction of the absolutism in 1660.		
Elingård	Fredrikstad Municipality	Before the introduction of the absolutism in 1660.		
Evje	Rygge Municipality			
Falkensten	Horten Municipality			
Finne	Voss Municipality			
Folberg	Nes Municipality			
Fossesholm	Øvre Eiker Municipality			
Fosser	Rakkestad Municipality			
Fossnes	Sandefjord Municipality			
Fritzøe	Larvik Municipality	Before the introduction of the absolutism in 1660.		
Førde	Volda Municipality	1599 Carsten (Karsten) Jonsson to Førde.		
Giske	Giske Municipality			
Gjemsø Abbey	Skien Municipality			
Gjeresvik				
Gloppe (Halsen)	Larvik Municipality			
Grefsheim	Ringsaker Municipality			
Hafslund	Sarpsborg Municipality			
Halsnøy Abbey	Kvinnherad Municipality			
Hananger	Farsund Municipality			
Hatteberg later Rosendal	Kvinnherad Municipality			
Helle				
Herrebrøden	Halden Municipality			
Herløy				
Holla (Holden)	Hemne Municipality			
Holleby				
Horne	Stange Municipality			
Hovinsholm	Ringsaker Municipality			
Hovland	Tysnes Municipality			
Hustad	Hustadvika Municipality			
Håland	Sunnhordland			
Inndyr	Gildeskål Municipality			
Jarlsberg	Tønsberg Municipality			
Jordanger	Luster Municipality			
Kambo	Moss Municipality			
Kanestraum	Tingvoll Municipality			
Kaupanger	Sogndal Municipality			
Kjølberg	Fredrikstad Municipality			
Ytre Kroken	Luster Municipality			
Kvåle	Sogndal Municipality			
Kårhus	Vindafjord Municipality			
Lade	Trondheim Municipality			
Landvik	Grimstad Municipality			
Laurvig	Larvik Municipality			
Losna	Solund Municipality			
Lunde				
Lundestad	Halden Municipality			
Lungegården	Bergen Municipality			
Lyse Abbey	Bjørnafjorden Municipality			
Malkenes	Tysnes Municipality			
Manvik	Larvik Municipality			
Mel	Kvinnherad Municipality			
Mellø (Mela)				
Melsom				
Møhus/Mjøs	Alver Municipality			
Mindnes	Alstahaug Municipality			
Nes				
Nesøya	Asker Municipality			
Nordvi	Stange Municipality			
Nygård	Fredrikstad Municipality			
Nørholm	Grimstad Municipality			
Os	Halden Municipality			
Onarheim	Tysnes Municipality			
Orningsgård	Stord Municipality			
Rein Abbey	Indre Fosen Municipality			
Sakslund	Stange Municipality			
Samsal	Ringsaker Municipality			
Sande	Sarpsborg Municipality			
Sandviken	Sunnhordland			
Sandviken	Nordhordland			
Seim	Kvinnherad Municipality			
Sem (Semb)	Øvre Eiker Municipality			
Sem	Tønsberg Municipality			
Skapal	Ringsaker Municipality			
Skjelbred	Øvre Eiker Municipality			
Herre-Skjelbred	Sandefjord Municipality			
Skjersnes	Færder Municipality			
Skredshol	Ringsaker Municipality			
Stedje	Sogndal Municipality			
Stend	Bergen Municipality			
Storfosen	Ørland Municipality			
Storhamar	Hamar Municipality			
Strøm				
Stumberg	Halden Municipality			
Sørum	Sørum Municipality			
Svanøya	Kinn Municipality			
Sørum (Sørheim)	Luster Municipality			
Tisle	Kongsberg Municipality			
Tjerne	Ringsaker Municipality			
Tomb (Tom)	Råde Municipality			
Torsnes	Ullensvang Municipality			
Tose (Thorsøe)	Fredrikstad Municipality			
Tønnøl (Tøndel)	Ørland Municipality			
Tøyen	Oslo Municipality			
Ulefoss	Nome Municipality			
Ulven	Ringsaker Municipality			
Ulleland (Ulveland)	Øvre Eiker Municipality			
Vatne	Sunnhordland			
Veen (Veden)	Halden Municipality			
Vestnes	Vestnes Municipality			
Værne Abbey	Moss Municipality			
Yttersø	Larvik Municipality			
Åker	Hamar Municipality			

== See also ==
- Danish nobility
- Finnish nobility
- Norwegian nobility
- Swedish nobility

== Literature ==
- Hvidtfeldt, Johan (editor): Håndbog for danske lokalhistorikere (in Danish)
- Vigerust, Tore H.: vigerust.net: Adelens setegårder, hovedgårder og jordegods i Norge til ca 1800 at vigerust.net (in Norwegian)
- Nationalencyklopedin: säteri at ne.se (in Swedish)
- Norsk historisk leksikon: Setegård at lokalhistoriewiki.no (in Norwegian)
- Store norske leksikon: setegård at snl.no (in Norwegian)
