= Tysnes Church =

Church in Vestland, Norway

- Tysnes kirke
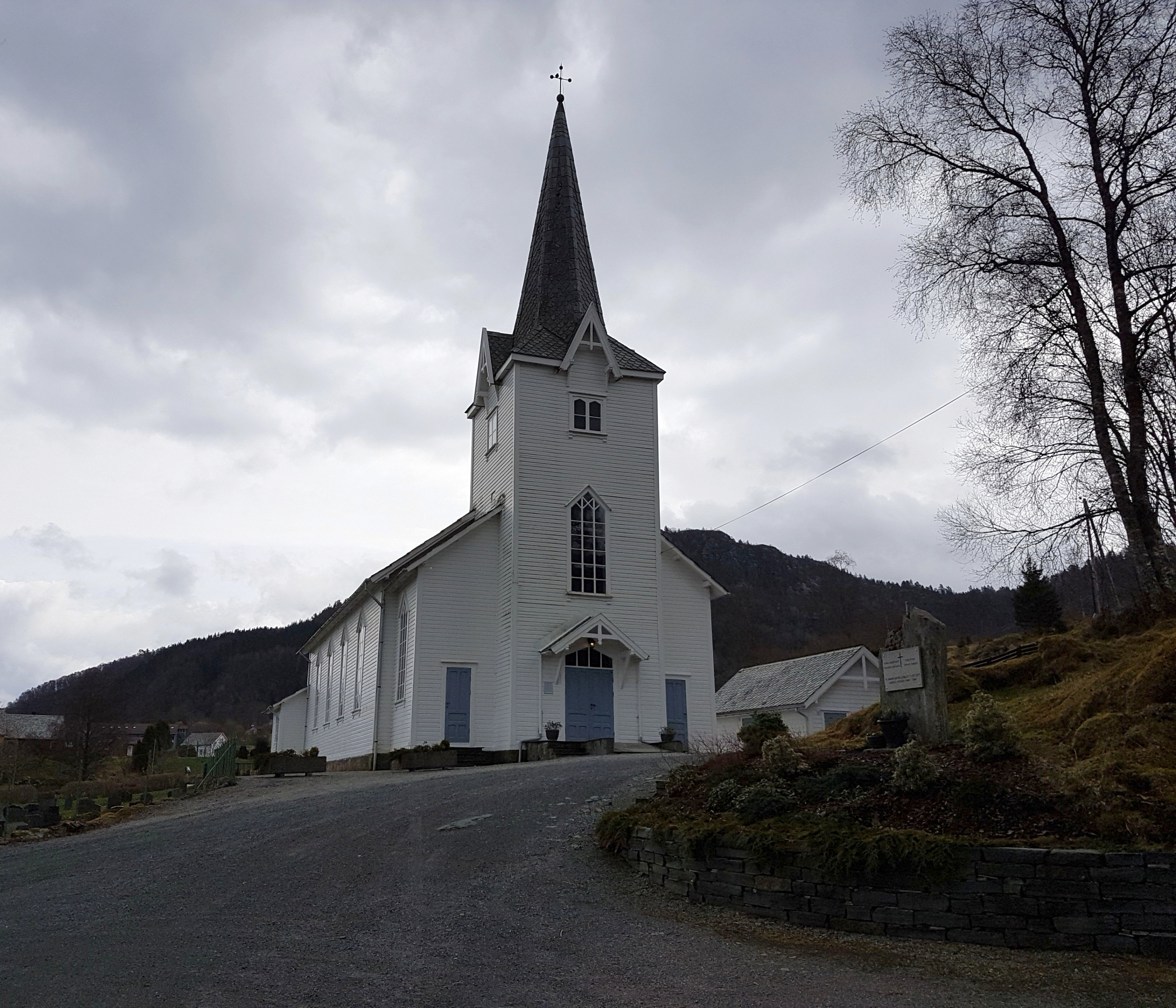
- View of the church
- Tysnes Church
- 60°02′26″N 5°31′52″E
- Location: Tysnes, Vestland
- Country: Norway
- Denomination: Church of Norway
- Previous denomination: Catholic Church
- Churchmanship: Evangelical Lutheran

History
- Status: Parish church
- Founded: 13th century
- Consecrated: 4 Sept 1867

Architecture
- Functional status: Active
- Architect(s): Georg Bull and H.S. Eckhoff
- Architectural type: Long church
- Completed: 1867 (159 years ago)

Specifications
- Capacity: 370
- Materials: Wood

Administration
- Diocese: Bjørgvin bispedømme
- Deanery: Sunnhordland prosti
- Parish: Tysnes
- Norwegian Cultural Heritage Site
- Type: Church
- Status: Listed
- ID: 177787

Tysnes Church (Norwegian: Tysnes kyrkje) is a parish church of the Church of Norway in Tysnes Municipality in Vestland county, Norway. It is located in the village of Våge on the northern shore of the island of Tysnesøya. It is the church for the Tysnes parish which is part of the Sunnhordland prosti (deanery) in the Diocese of Bjørgvin. The white, wooden church was built in a long church design in 1867 using plans drawn up by the architects Georg Andreas Bull and Hartvig Sverdrup Eckhoff. The church seats about 370 people.

== History ==
The earliest existing historical records of the church date back to the year 1329, but it was not new at that time. The first church here was a wooden stave church located at Tysnes, about 1.4 kilometres (0.87 mi) north of the present church site. It was likely built during the 13th century. From 1685 to 1688, the old church was torn down and a new timber-framed long church was built on the same site. It was built by Erik Fyllingsnes from Lindaas and Oluf Bysemb from Osterøy.

In 1814, this church served as an election church (Norwegian: valgkirke). Together with more than 300 other parish churches across Norway, it was a polling station for elections to the 1814 Norwegian Constituent Assembly which wrote the Constitution of Norway. This was Norway's first national elections. Each church parish was a constituency that elected people called "electors" who later met together in each county to elect the representatives for the assembly that was to meet at Eidsvoll Manor later that year.

During the 1860s, the parish determined that the old church needed to be replaced. A new church site was chosen about 70 metres (230 ft) to the southwest of the old church site. In 1865, Georg Bull was hired to design the new building and Askild Aase was hired as the lead builder. The foundation stone was laid in 1867 and the new building was consecrated on 4 September 1868. The old church was torn down after the new building was completed. In 1906, the church was disassembled and moved about 1.4 kilometres (0.87 mi) to the southwest, across the bay to Gjerstad where it was rebuilt. It was moved here because it was closer to the main village. Since the old architectural designs of the church were lost, the architect Hartvig Sverdrup Eckhoff was hired to design the newly rebuilt church. The building was consecrated on 27 September 1906. In 1977, the church was extensively remodeled, and then re-consecrated on 4 October 1977.

== See also ==
- List of churches in Bjørgvin
