= Våge, Tysnes =

Village in Tysnes Municipality, Norway

Våge
- Village
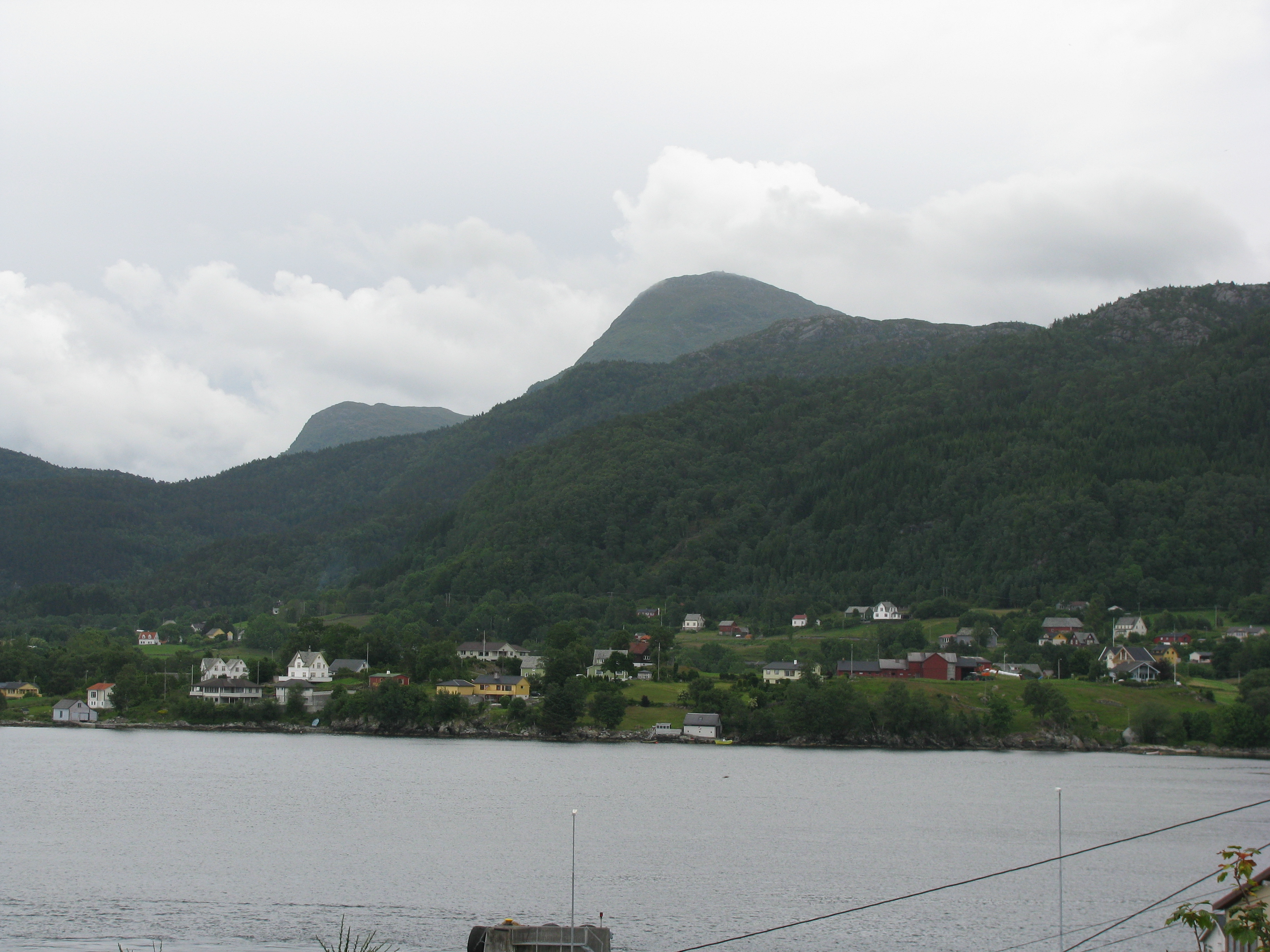
- View of the village
- Interactive map of Våge
- Coordinates: 60.04349°N 5.52274°E
- Country: Norway
- Region: Western Norway
- County: Vestland
- District: Sunnhordland
- Municipality: Tysnes Municipality

Area
  - Total: 1.05 km^{2} (0.41 sq mi)
- Elevation: 7 m (23 ft)

Population (2025)
  - Total: 893
  - Density: 850/km^{2} (2,200/sq mi)
- Time zone: UTC+01:00 (CET)
  - Summer (DST): UTC+02:00 (CEST)
- Post Code: 5680 Tysnes

Våge is the largest village in Tysnes Municipality in Vestland county, Norway. The village is located on the northern shore of the island of Tysnesøya, about 4 kilometres (2.5 mi) north of the village of Uggdalseidet. The village is the site of Tysnes Church. The village has a ferry quay that has regular connections to Haljem on the mainland in Bjørnafjorden Municipality on the other side of the Bjørnafjorden.

The 1.05-square-kilometre (260-acre) village has a population (2025) of 893 and a population density of 850 inhabitants per square kilometre (2,200/sq mi).
