= Tysnes Municipality =

Municipality in Vestland, Norway

Tysnes Municipality Tysnes kommune
- Municipality
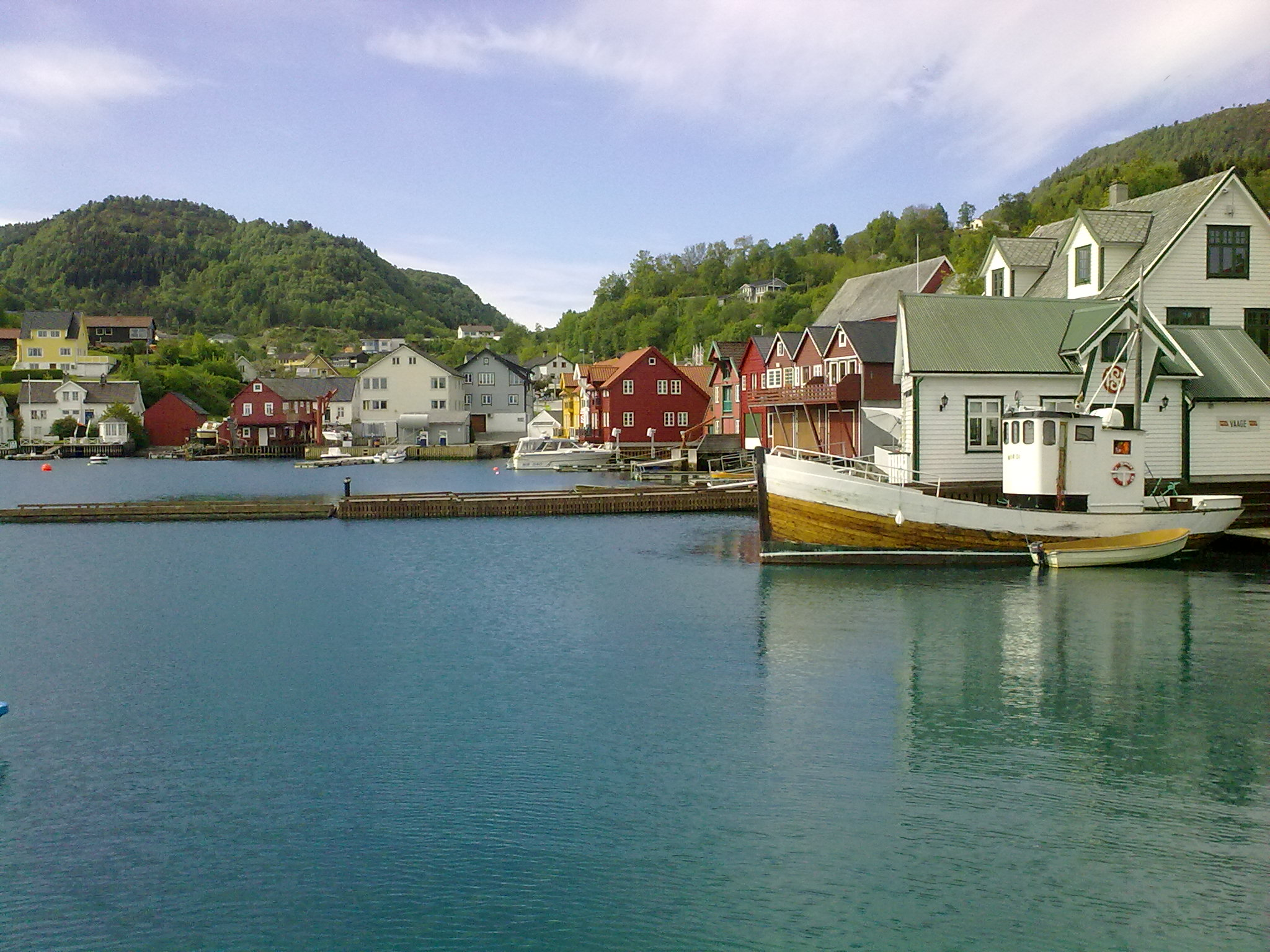
- The harbour in Våge

- Coat of arms

- Vestland within Norway

- Tysnes within Vestland
- Coordinates: 59°59′54″N 05°34′38″E
- Country: Norway
- County: Vestland
- District: Sunnhordland
- Established: 1 Jan 1838
  - Created as: Formannskapsdistrikt
- Administrative centre: Uggdal

Government
  - Mayor (2023): Synnøve Bakke (Ap)

Area
  - Total: 255.12 km^{2} (98.50 sq mi)
  - Land: 245.19 km^{2} (94.67 sq mi)
  - Water: 9.93 km^{2} (3.83 sq mi) 3.9%
  - Rank: #284 in Norway
- Highest elevation: 752.09 m (2,467.5 ft)

Population (2025)
  - Total: 2,986
  - Rank: #229 in Norway
  - Density: 11.7/km^{2} (30/sq mi)
  - Change (10 years): ▲ +6.4%
- Demonym: Tysnesing

Official language
  - Norwegian form: Nynorsk
- Time zone: UTC+01:00 (CET)
  - Summer (DST): UTC+02:00 (CEST)
- ISO 3166 code: NO-4616
- Website: Official website

Tysnes (Urban East Norwegian: [ˈtŷːsneːs]) is a municipality in Vestland county, Norway. It is located in the traditional district of Sunnhordland. The administrative centre is the village of Uggdal. Other population centres in Tysnes include the villages of Våge and Onarheim. The island municipality is located in a group of islands near the mouth of the Hardangerfjorden. The majority of the municipal population lives on the island of Tysnesøya, the largest island in the municipality.

The 255.12-square-kilometre (98.50 sq mi) municipality is the 284th largest by area out of the 357 municipalities in Norway. Tysnes Municipality is the 229th most populous municipality in Norway with a population of 2,986. The municipality's population density is 11.7 inhabitants per square kilometre (30/sq mi) and its population has increased by 6.4% over the previous 10-year period.

== General information ==
The historic parish of Tysnæs (later spelled Tysnes) was established as a municipality on 1 January 1838 (see formannskapsdistrikt law). On 1 January 1907, the small portion of Tysnes Municipality located on the mainland (population: 67) was transferred to the neighboring Kvinnherad Municipality. The municipal borders have not changed since that time.

=== Name ===
The municipality (originally the parish) is named after the old Tysnes farm (Old Norse: Týsnes) since the first Tysnes Church was built there. The first element is the genitive case of the name of the Old Norse god Týr. The last element is nes which means "headland".

This is probably the only place in Norway named after the god Týr. Several place names around the farm also have sacred meanings: Ve (holy place), Helgastein (holy rock), Godøy (the god's island), and Vevatnet (the holy lake). The old name of the big island of Tysnesøy was Njarðarlǫg (the district of the god Njord). Recently, a sun phenomenon connected to the original Tysnes headland has been discovered, and this seems to be the starting-point of the sacral name complex.

=== Coat of arms ===
Old arms in use from 1971 until 2020.

Coat of arms in use starting in 2020.

The first coat of arms for Tysnes was adopted on 28 October 1971 and it was in use until 1 January 2020 when a new coat of arms replaced it. The official blazon is "Azure, under a chevron two crossed axes argent" (Norwegian: På blå grunn to sølvfarga kryssede økser med sparre over). This means the arms have a blue field (background) and the charge is two crossed axes under a chevron. The charge has a tincture of argent which means it is commonly colored white, but if it is made out of metal, then silver is used. The arms were derived from the seal of the medieval Onarheim guild (Olavsgildet). Onarheim is a village on the island of Tysnesøya which was historically a Viking Age center of power in the Sunnhordland region. The chevron above the axes was added to the municipal arms to distinguish it from the medieval arms and the arms for the old Hordaland county. The arms were designed by Magnus Hardeland. The municipal flag had the same design as the coat of arms.

The old coat of arms was never formally adopted because it was too similar to the coat of arms for Hordaland county and the government refused to approve it. After Hordaland county became part of the new Vestland county, the Hordaland arms were no longer used. Additionally, a law was also changed, giving the municipal councils the ultimate authority to determine their own coats of arms, so Tysnes decided to review their arms. The council debated approving the old arms or choosing to adopt the arms of the old Hordaland county (with different colors). In 2020, the council adopted a new coat of arms based on the old Hordaland arms. The official blazon is "Azure, under a royal crown two crossed axes argent" (Norwegian: På blå grunn to sølvfarga kryssede økser med krone over.). This means the arms have a blue field (background) and the charge is a two crossed axes under a three pointed crown. The charge has a tincture of argent which means it is commonly colored white, but if it is made out of metal, then silver is used. This design was chosen because it more closely resembled the old Onarheim arms than the previous design. The municipal flag has the same design as the coat of arms.

=== Churches ===
The Church of Norway has three parishes (sokn) within Tysnes Municipality. It is part of the Sunnhordland prosti (deanery) in the Diocese of Bjørgvin.

Churches in Tysnes Municipality
Parish (sokn)	Church name	Location of the church	Year built
Onarheim	Onarheim Church	Onarheim	1893
Reksteren og Uggdal	Reksteren Church	Reksteren	1937
Reksteren og Uggdal	Uggdal Church	Uggdal	1876
Tysnes	Tysnes Church	Våge	1868

== Government ==
Tysnes Municipality is responsible for primary education (through 10th grade), outpatient health services, senior citizen services, welfare and other social services, zoning, economic development, and municipal roads and utilities. The municipality is governed by a municipal council of directly elected representatives. The mayor is indirectly elected by a vote of the municipal council. The municipality is under the jurisdiction of the Haugaland og Sunnhordland District Court and the Gulating Court of Appeal.

=== Municipal council ===
The municipal council (Kommunestyre) of Tysnes Municipality is made up of 21 representatives that are elected to four year terms. The tables below show the current and historical composition of the council by political party.

Tysnes kommunestyre 2023–2027
Party name (in Nynorsk)	Number of representatives
Labour Party (Arbeidarpartiet)	4
Progress Party (Framstegspartiet)	2
Conservative Party (Høgre)	5
Industry and Business Party (Industri‑ og Næringspartiet)	3
Christian Democratic Party (Kristeleg Folkeparti)	1
Centre Party (Senterpartiet)	3
Socialist Left Party (Sosialistisk Venstreparti)	3
Total number of members:	21

Tysnes kommunestyre 2019–2023
Party name (in Nynorsk)	Number of representatives
Labour Party (Arbeidarpartiet)	4
Progress Party (Framstegspartiet)	2
Conservative Party (Høgre)	8
Christian Democratic Party (Kristeleg Folkeparti)	1
Centre Party (Senterpartiet)	6
Total number of members:	21

Tysnes kommunestyre 2015–2019
Party name (in Nynorsk)	Number of representatives
Labour Party (Arbeidarpartiet)	7
Progress Party (Framstegspartiet)	2
Conservative Party (Høgre)	5
Christian Democratic Party (Kristeleg Folkeparti)	2
Centre Party (Senterpartiet)	4
Liberal Party (Venstre)	1
Total number of members:	21

Tysnes kommunestyre 2011–2015
Party name (in Nynorsk)	Number of representatives
Labour Party (Arbeidarpartiet)	6
Progress Party (Framstegspartiet)	4
Conservative Party (Høgre)	4
Christian Democratic Party (Kristeleg Folkeparti)	3
Centre Party (Senterpartiet)	2
Liberal Party (Venstre)	2
Total number of members:	21

Tysnes kommunestyre 2007–2011
Party name (in Nynorsk)	Number of representatives
Labour Party (Arbeidarpartiet)	2
Progress Party (Framstegspartiet)	4
Conservative Party (Høgre)	3
Christian Democratic Party (Kristeleg Folkeparti)	3
Centre Party (Senterpartiet)	4
Liberal Party (Venstre)	3
Cross-Party List (Tverrpolitisk liste)	2
Total number of members:	21

Tysnes kommunestyre 2003–2007
Party name (in Nynorsk)	Number of representatives
Labour Party (Arbeidarpartiet)	4
Progress Party (Framstegspartiet)	3
Conservative Party (Høgre)	3
Christian Democratic Party (Kristeleg Folkeparti)	3
Centre Party (Senterpartiet)	4
Liberal Party (Venstre)	1
Cross-Party List (Tverrpolitisk liste)	2
Total number of members:	21

Tysnes kommunestyre 1999–2003
Party name (in Nynorsk)	Number of representatives
Labour Party (Arbeidarpartiet)	4
Progress Party (Framstegspartiet)	2
Conservative Party (Høgre)	5
Christian Democratic Party (Kristeleg Folkeparti)	6
Centre Party (Senterpartiet)	3
Cross-Party List (Tverrpolitisk liste)	3
Total number of members:	23

Tysnes kommunestyre 1995–1999
Party name (in Nynorsk)	Number of representatives
Labour Party (Arbeidarpartiet)	5
Progress Party (Framstegspartiet)	2
Conservative Party (Høgre)	3
Christian Democratic Party (Kristeleg Folkeparti)	6
Centre Party (Senterpartiet)	7
Total number of members:	23

Tysnes kommunestyre 1991–1995
Party name (in Nynorsk)	Number of representatives
Labour Party (Arbeidarpartiet)	4
Progress Party (Framstegspartiet)	2
Conservative Party (Høgre)	5
Christian Democratic Party (Kristeleg Folkeparti)	5
Centre Party (Senterpartiet)	9
Total number of members:	25

Tysnes kommunestyre 1987–1991
Party name (in Nynorsk)	Number of representatives
Labour Party (Arbeidarpartiet)	4
Conservative Party (Høgre)	6
Christian Democratic Party (Kristeleg Folkeparti)	4
Centre Party (Senterpartiet)	10
Liberal Party (Venstre)	1
Total number of members:	25

Tysnes kommunestyre 1983–1987
Party name (in Nynorsk)	Number of representatives
Labour Party (Arbeidarpartiet)	4
Conservative Party (Høgre)	8
Christian Democratic Party (Kristeleg Folkeparti)	5
Centre Party (Senterpartiet)	7
Liberal Party (Venstre)	1
Total number of members:	25

Tysnes kommunestyre 1979–1983
Party name (in Nynorsk)	Number of representatives
Labour Party (Arbeidarpartiet)	3
Conservative Party (Høgre)	6
Christian Democratic Party (Kristeleg Folkeparti)	6
Centre Party (Senterpartiet)	6
Liberal Party (Venstre)	2
Election list for Reksteren (Valliste for Reksteren)	2
Total number of members:	25

Tysnes kommunestyre 1975–1979
Party name (in Nynorsk)	Number of representatives
Election list for Reksteren (Valliste for Reksteren)	2
Election list for Onarheim (Valliste for Onarheim)	4
Election list for Uggdal (Valliste for Uggdal)	9
Election list for Tysnes and Lunde school districts (Valliste for Tysnes og Lunde skulekrets)	10
Total number of members:	25

Tysnes kommunestyre 1971–1975
Party name (in Nynorsk)	Number of representatives
Local List(s) (Lokale lister)	25
Total number of members:	25

Tysnes kommunestyre 1967–1971
Party name (in Nynorsk)	Number of representatives
Local List(s) (Lokale lister)	25
Total number of members:	25

Tysnes kommunestyre 1963–1967
Party name (in Nynorsk)	Number of representatives
Labour Party (Arbeidarpartiet)	2
Conservative Party (Høgre)	3
Local List(s) (Lokale lister)	20
Total number of members:	25

Tysnes heradsstyre 1959–1963
Party name (in Nynorsk)	Number of representatives
Labour Party (Arbeidarpartiet)	2
Conservative Party (Høgre)	2
Local List(s) (Lokale lister)	21
Total number of members:	25

Tysnes heradsstyre 1955–1959
Party name (in Nynorsk)	Number of representatives
Labour Party (Arbeidarpartiet)	3
Local List(s) (Lokale lister)	22
Total number of members:	25

Tysnes heradsstyre 1951–1955
Party name (in Nynorsk)	Number of representatives
Local List(s) (Lokale lister)	32
Total number of members:	32

Tysnes heradsstyre 1947–1951
Party name (in Nynorsk)	Number of representatives
List of workers, fishermen, and small farmholders (Arbeidarar, fiskarar, småbrukarar liste)	1
Local List(s) (Lokale lister)	31
Total number of members:	32

Tysnes heradsstyre 1945–1947
Party name (in Nynorsk)	Number of representatives
List of workers, fishermen, and small farmholders (Arbeidarar, fiskarar, småbrukarar liste)	2
Local List(s) (Lokale lister)	30
Total number of members:	32

Tysnes heradsstyre 1937–1941*
Party name (in Nynorsk)	Number of representatives
Local List(s) (Lokale lister)	30
Total number of members:	30
Note: Due to the German occupation of Norway during World War II, no elections were held for new municipal councils until after the war ended in 1945.

=== Mayors ===
The mayors (Nynorsk: ordførar) of Tysnes:

- 1838–1841: Georg Døderlein Greve
- 1842–1845: Hans Olsen Bakke
- 1846–1849: Rudolph Grip Normann
- 1850–1853: Johan Frederik Voss
- 1854–1861: Herman Olai Hermandsen
- 1862–1863: Bård J. Nordbustad
- 1864–1873: Carl Marius Mohr
- 1874–1881: Herman Olai Hermandsen
- 1882–1885: Halvor Gjestland
- 1886–1889: Ole H. Mevatne
- 1890–1898: Amund J. Utne
- 1899–1918: Lars B. Sunde
- 1918–1934: Aksel Gjersvik
- 1935–1942: Jens Flornes
- 1942–1944: Erling Jonsgard (NS)
- 1944–1945: Reidar Johannessen (NS)
- 1945–1945: Jens Flornes
- 1947–1947: Johannes M. Lunde
- 1948–1955: Torbjørn Onarheim
- 1956–1959: Johannes Heggland
- 1960–1967: Martinus A. Færevaag
- 1968–1971: Johannes Heggland
- 1972–1979: Leif Andersland
- 1979–1983: Tor Ottersen (H)
- 1983–1995: Helge Hauge (Sp)
- 1995–2003: Lorentz Lunde (Sp)
- 2003–2011: Helge Hauge (Sp)
- 2011–2015: Kjetil Hestad (Sp)
- 2015–2023: Kåre Martin Kleppe (H)
- 2023–present: Synnøve Bakke (Ap)

== Geography ==
The municipality consists of a group of islands, located south of the city of Bergen where the Hardangerfjorden and the coastal archipelago meet. The Bjørnafjorden lies north of the municipality and the Langenuen strait runs along the western side of the municipality. The largest of these islands, named Tysnesøya, can be reached from the mainland either by ferry to the village of Våge on the north side of the island or by the road bridge constructed on the eastern side of the island. The second largest island is Reksteren, which is connected to Tysnesøya by a small road bridge. The highest point in the municipality is the 752.09-metre (2,467.5 ft) tall mountain Tysnessåta.

Bjørnafjorden Municipality is located to the north, Kvinnherad Municipality is located to the east, Stord Municipality is located to the southeast, Fitjar Municipality is located to the west, and Austevoll Municipality is located to the northwest.

== Population ==
Historical population

Year	Pop.	±% p.a.
1845	3,758	—
1855	4,110	+0.90%
1865	4,274	+0.39%
1875	4,464	+0.44%
1891	4,590	+0.17%
1900	4,603	+0.03%
1910	4,951	+0.73%

Year	Pop.	±% p.a.
1920	4,416	−1.14%
1930	4,379	−0.08%
1946	4,009	−0.55%
1951	3,866	−0.72%
1960	3,559	−0.92%
1970	3,019	−1.63%
1980	2,774	−0.84%

Year	Pop.	±% p.a.
1990	2,915	+0.50%
2000	2,843	−0.25%
2010	2,779	−0.23%
2020	2,869	+0.32%
2023	2,910	+0.47%

Source: Statistics Norway and Norwegian Historical Data Centre

== Media ==
The newspaper Tysnes has been published in Tysnes since 1953.

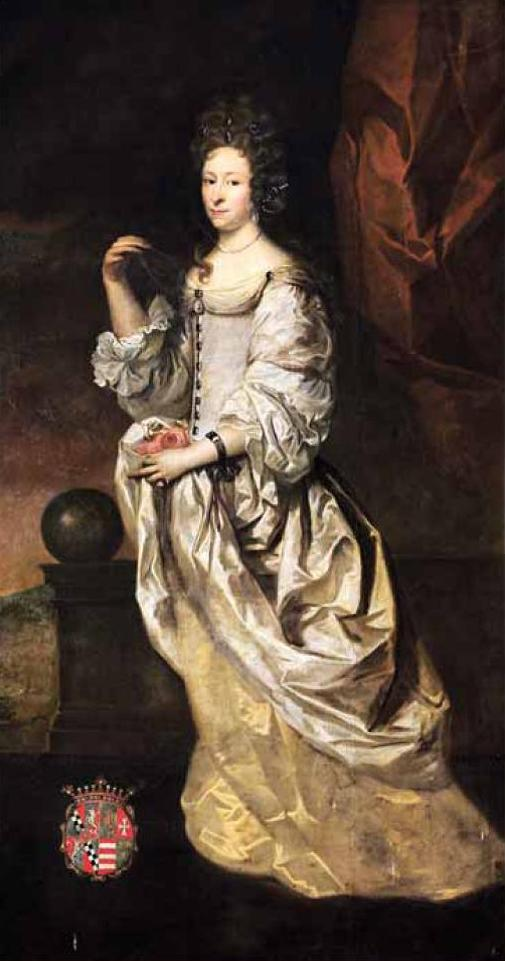
Karen Mowat, 17th century

== Notable people ==
- Anders Mowatt of Hugoland (ca. 1530 – ca. 1610 in Tysnes), a Scottish merchant, navy admiral, and landowner
- Axel Mowat (1592 in Tysnes – 1661), a naval officer and land owner becoming Barony Rosendal
- Karen Mowat (ca. 1630 in Tysnes – 1675), a Norwegian noblewoman, heiress, and landowner of Scottish origins
- Claus Pavels Riis (1826–1886), an author who settled in Tysnes as a landowner and gardener
- Olav Gurvin (1893 in Tysnes – 1974), a musicologist and academic
- Johannes Heggland (1919 in Tysnes – 2008), a novelist, short story and children's literature writer, playwright, and politician
- Magnus Aarbakke (born 1934 in Tysnes), a judge and Norwegian Supreme Court Justice from 1994 to 2002

== Gallery ==
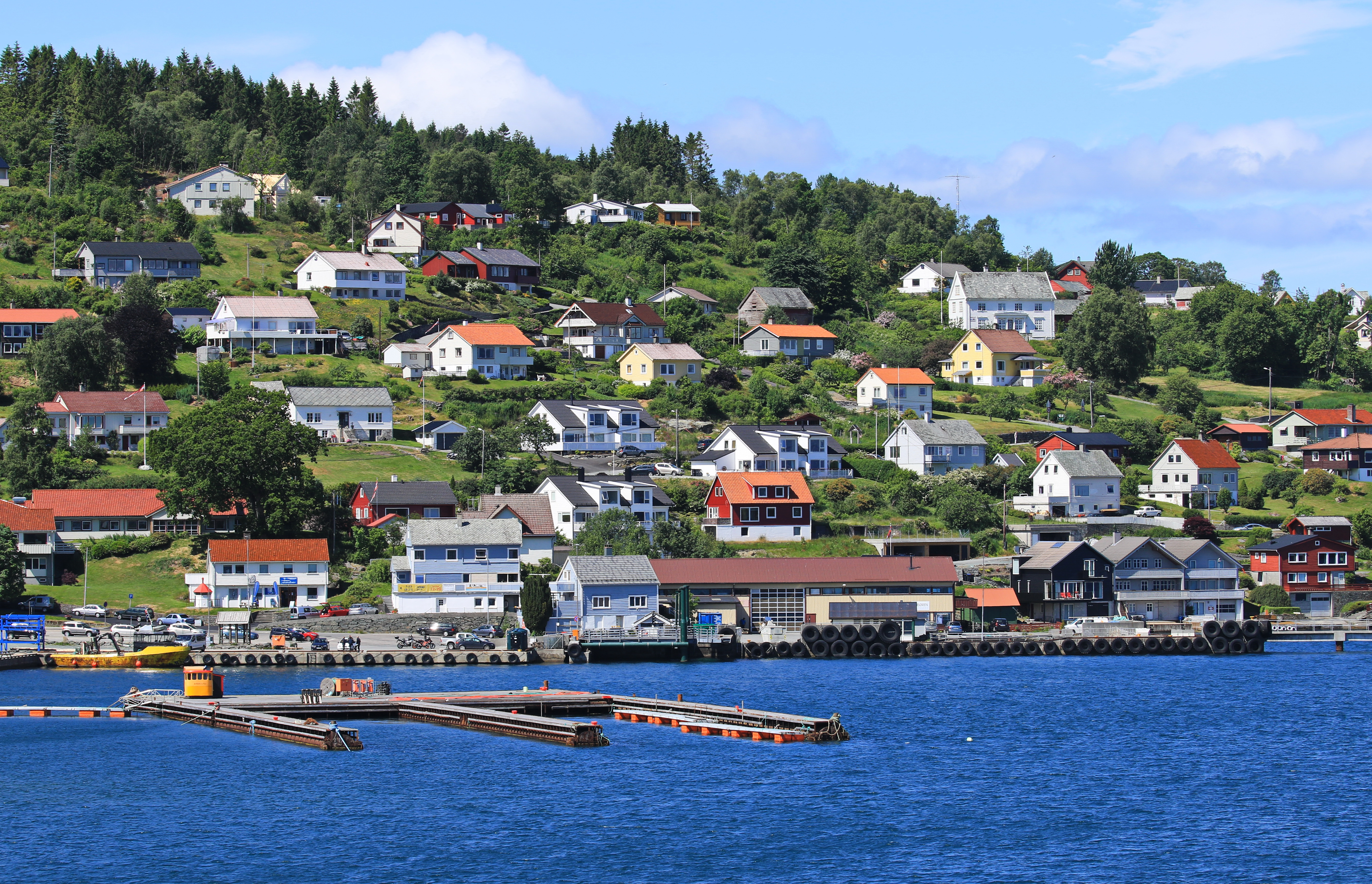
Island of Tysnes

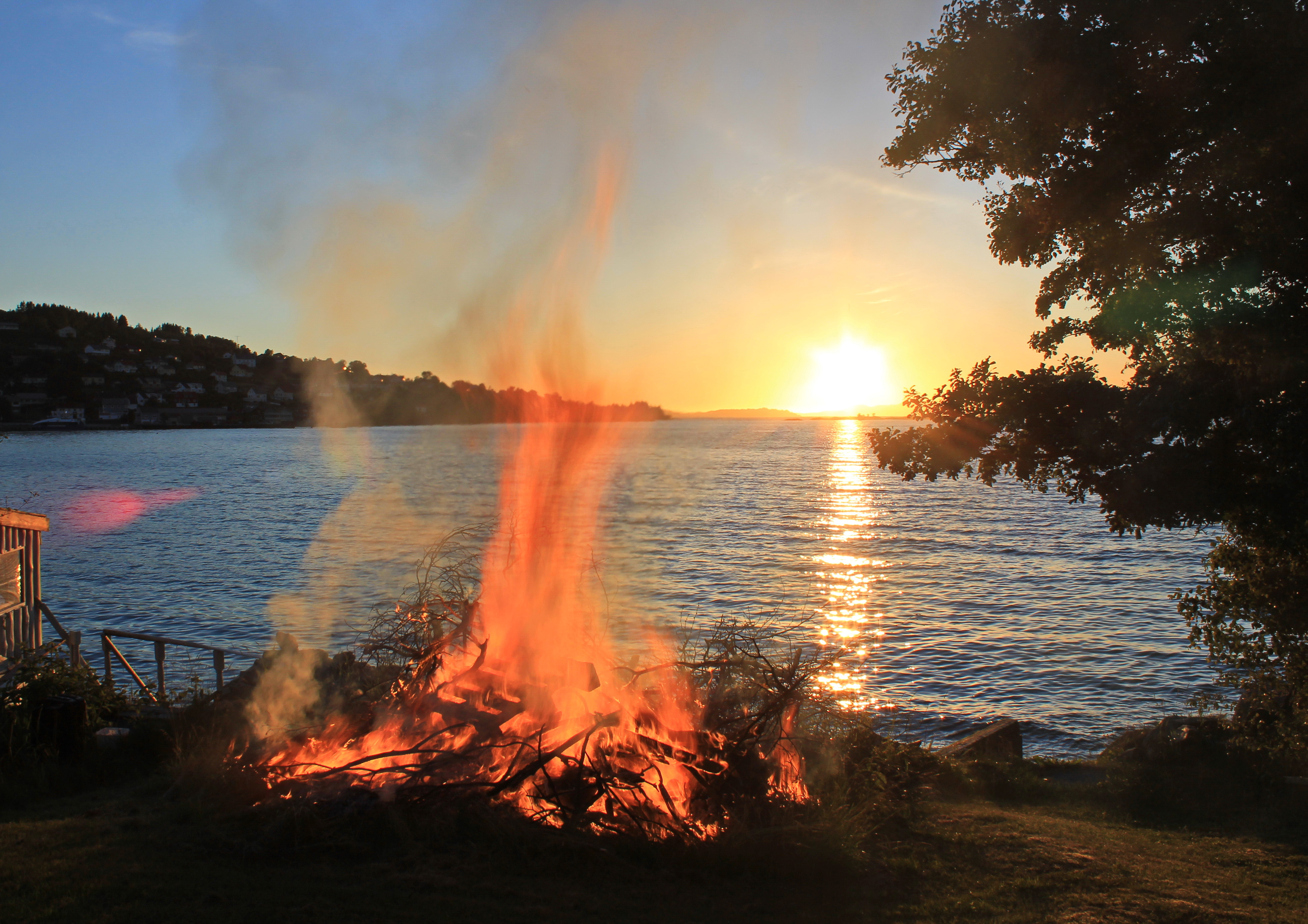
Midsummer festival, Island of Tysnes

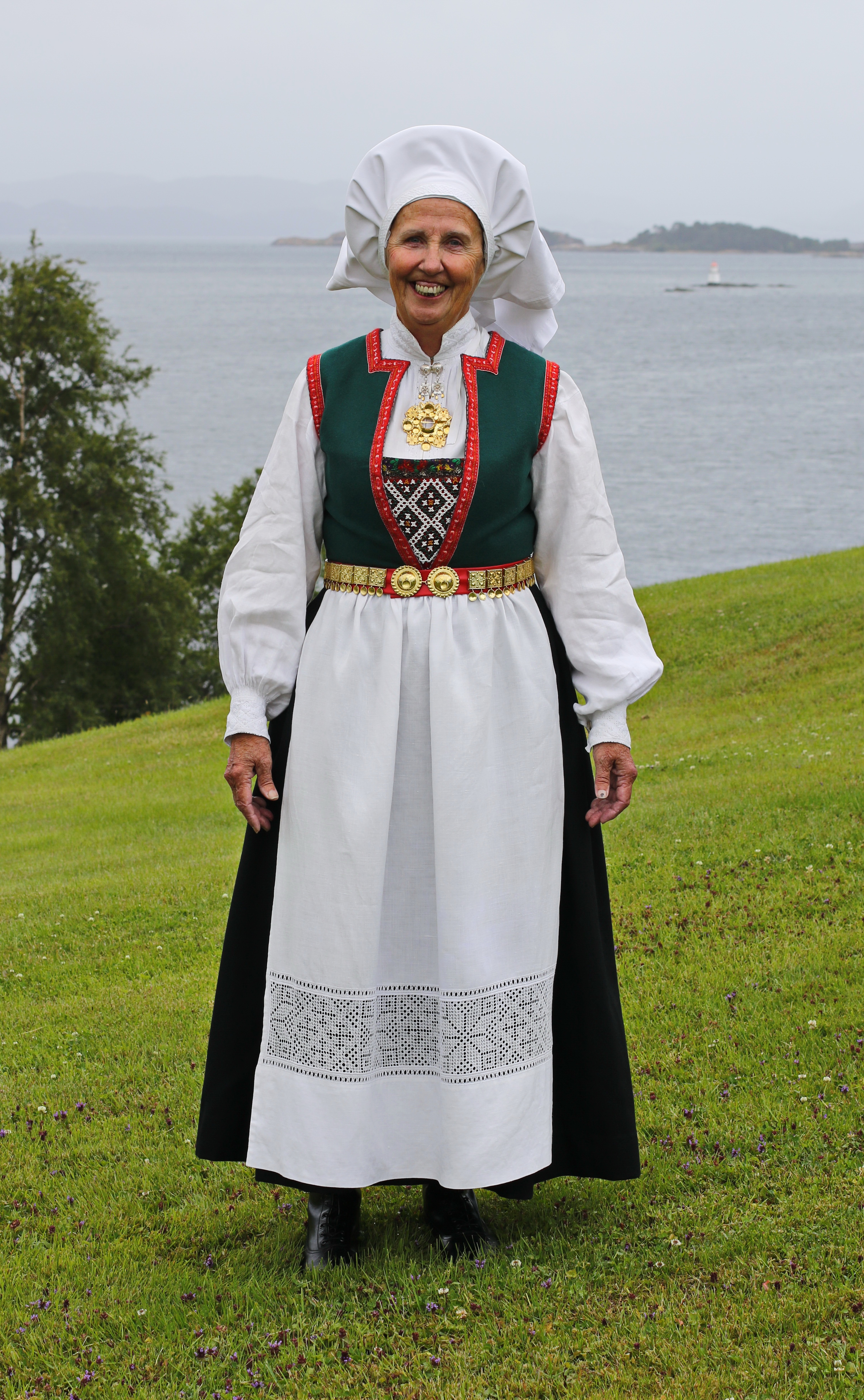
National dress on the island of Tysnes

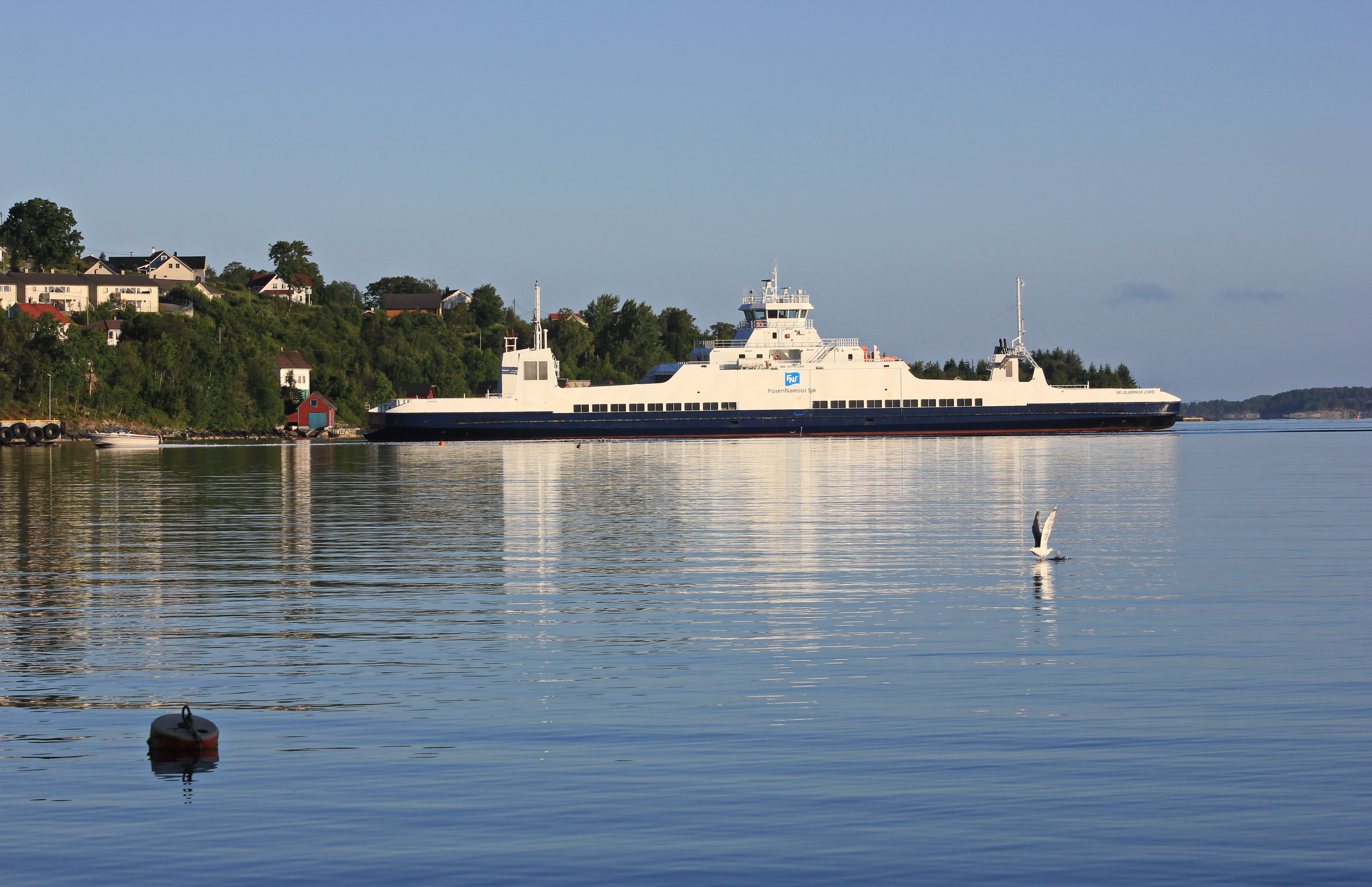
Ferry in Tysnes
