= Tysnesøya =

Island in Norway

Tysnesøya Tysnes
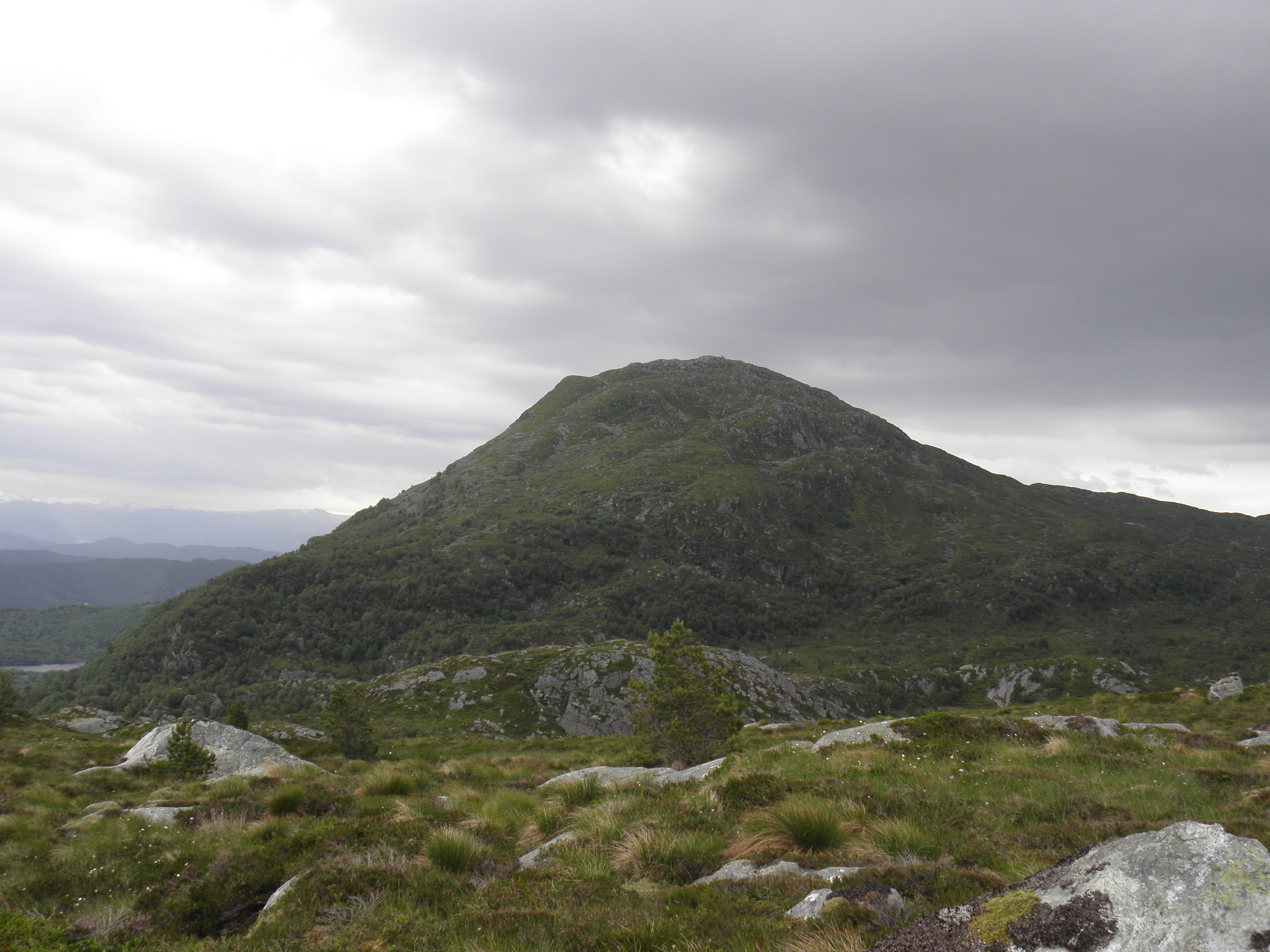
- View of Tysnessåto, the highest point on the island
- Interactive map of the island

Geography
- Location: Vestland, Norway
- Coordinates: 59.9759°N 5.4457°E
- Area: 198 km^{2} (76 sq mi)
- Length: 20 km (12 mi)
- Width: 18 km (11.2 mi)
- Highest elevation: 753 m (2470 ft)
- Highest point: Tysnessåto

Administration
- Norway
- County: Vestland
- Municipality: Tysnes Municipality

Demographics
- Population: 2,690 (2023)
- Pop. density: 13/km^{2} (34/sq mi)

Tysnesøya (Urban East Norwegian: [ˈtŷːsneːsˌœʏɑ]) is an island in Tysnes Municipality in Vestland county, Norway. The 198-square-kilometre (76 sq mi) island makes up the vast majority of Tysnes Municipality. The highest point on the island is the 753-metre (2,470 ft) tall mountain Tysnessåto.

The island lies in a large group of islands on the northern side of the mouth of the Hardangerfjorden. The Bjørnafjorden lies north of the island and the Langenuen strait runs along the west side of the island. The island of Reksteren lies to the northwest, Stord lies to the southwest, and the smaller islands of Skorpo and Huglo lie to the south of the island. The islands of Skorpo and Reksteren are connected to Tysnesøya by road bridges. The mainland lies just east of Tysnesøya, and there is a short road bridge connecting the two. Bjørnafjorden Municipality and Kvinnherad Municipality are located on the mainland to the east of Tysnesøya.

The island is rocky and mountainous in the north-central part of the island, while the rest of the island is more forested and hilly. The main agricultural areas are in the northeast and south. Some of the more notable villages on the island include the village of Våge in the north, Uggdal in the west, and Onarheim in the southeast.

== See also ==
- List of islands of Norway
