= Johan Frederik von Marschalck =

German-born Norwegian government official and landowner

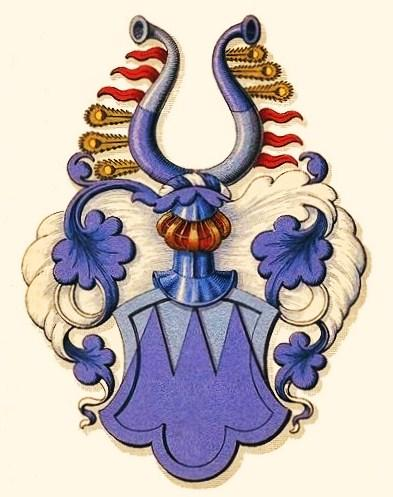
- Coat of arms of the Marschalck von Bachtenbrock family (modern reproduction)

Chancellor of Norway
- In office 1674–1679
- Monarch: Christian V
- Preceded by: Ove Bjelke
- Succeeded by: Office abolished

Vice-Chancellor of Norway
- In office 1669–1674
- Chancellor: Ove Bjelke

Governor of Bergenhus stiftamt
- In office 1669–1679
- Governor General: Ulrik Frederik Gyldenløve
- Preceded by: Hans Hansen Lillienskiold
- Succeeded by: Hans Hansen Lillienskiold

Governor of Bratsberg amt
- In office 1662–1669
- Governor: Ulrik Frederik Gyldenløve
- Preceded by: Jørgen Bjelke
- Succeeded by: Preben von Ahnen

Personal details
- Born: 26 November 1618 Bremervörde, Prince-Archbishopric of Bremen, Holy Roman Empire
- Died: 16 March 1679 (aged 60) Bergen, Norway, Denmark-Norway
- Spouse: Margrethe Bjelke (m. 1653)
- Children: Among others; Christian Frederik von Marschalck (1668–1738)
- Parents: Levin von Marschalck (father); Judith von Marschalck (mother)
- Relatives: Jens Bjelke (father-in-law); Ove Bjelke (brother-in-law); Henrik Bjelke (brother-in-law); Jørgen Bjelke (brother-in-law)
- Occupation: Nobleman, jurist and statesman

Johan Frederik von Marschalck (26 November 1618 – 16 March 1679) was a German-born, Norwegian government official and landowner. He served as the last Chancellor of Norway, ending a tradition that had lasted for over 400 years.

He was born in Bremervörde, capital of the Prince-Archbishopric of Bremen. He was a son of Levin von Marschalck (1585-1629), Bremian prince-archiepiscopal Landdrost (1615–1626) and chancellor of the German Chancery in Copenhagen (1628–1629). He first went to Denmark when he accompanied his father in the service of King Christian IV of Denmark-Norway. He was officially naturalized as Danish nobleman in 1652. He then moved to Norway, and was district governor in 1662-69 at Bratsberg amt and took office in 1669 as staple commander of Bergenhus. In 1674, he was elected Chancellor of Norway where his main functions were within the judiciary.

== Personal life ==
In 1653, he was married to Margrethe Bjelke (1622-1698), daughter of Chancellor and squire Jens Ågessøn Bjelke (1580-1659) and Sophie Henriksdatter Brockenhuus (1587-1656). She was the sister of Ove Bjelke (1611-1674), Henrik Bjelke (1615-1683) and Jørgen Bjelke (1621-1696) all of whom held prominent positions in Norway, and he does became a Norwegian nobleman. They were the parents of a number of children including Christian Frederik von Marschalck (born ca. 1650) who in 1686 became owner of the estate at Austrått (Austråttborgen) in Sør-Trøndelag, Norway.

Government offices
Preceded by Ove Bjelke	Chancellor of Norway; 1674–1679	Office abolished
Preceded by Hans Hansen Lillienskiold	County Governor of Bergenhus stiftamt 1669–1679	Succeeded by Hans Hansen Lillienskiold
Preceded by Jørgen Bjelke	County Governor of Bratsberg amt 1662–1669	Succeeded by Preben von Ahnen
