= Bjelke (noble family) =

- Nobility
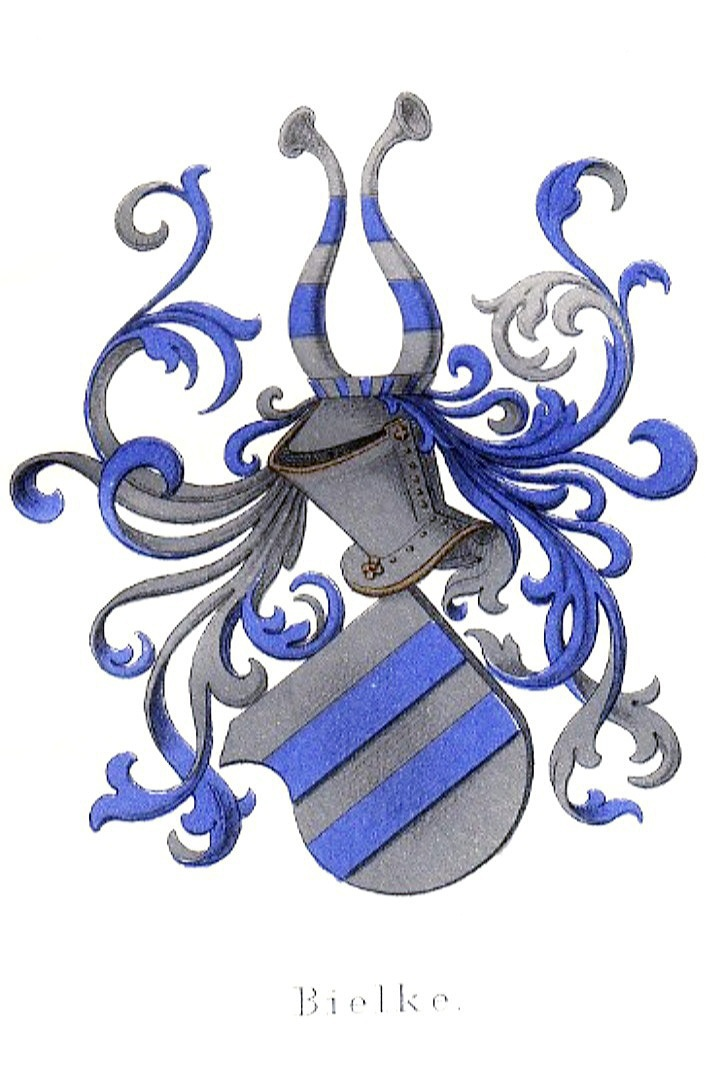
- Bjelke coat of arms.
- Country: Denmark; Norway
- Founded: 1400s
- Founder: Josef Andersen
- Estate: Austrått
- Dissolution: 1868 (agnatic)

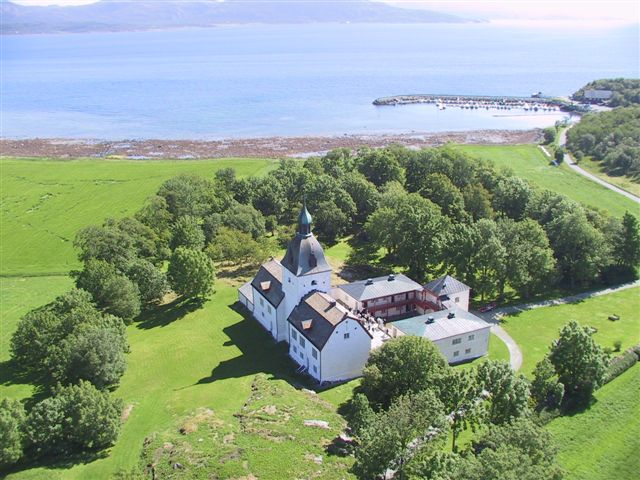
Manor of Austrått.

The Bjelke family, also spelled Bielke, was a Danish and Norwegian noble family, known since the mid-15th century and extinct in 1868.

== History ==
The family's progenitor was Josef Andersen of Gyllarp in Scania, living in the middle of the 15th century. His son Tilluf Josefsen to Gyllarp was the father of Jens Tillufsen Bjelke, who by his marriage to Lucie Nielsdatter Gyldenløve came to possess Austrått Fortress and Estate in the present-day Ørland Municipality, Norway. In the 17th century, this family was among the mightiest in the kingdom. The last man of the family was Carl Frederik Bjelke (1837–1868).

== Coat of arms ==
The family's arms are a silver shield depicting two blue beams (Norwegian: bjelke).

The coat of arms appears, among other places, in family members' wax seals, in heraldic artworks at Austrått Fortress, and in a portrait of Ove Bjelke.

== Connection to other families ==
The family has no confirmed connection to the Swedish family Bielke.

The other Bjelke family in Norway, living today, descends from the Swedish Bielke family known as Lilliebjelke (‘Lily Beam’).

== Prominent members ==
- Jens Tillufssøn Bjelke (died 1559), Feudal lord of Jemtland.
- Jens Bjelke (1580–1659), Chancellor of Norway.
- Ove Bjelke (1611-1674), Chancellor of Norway.
- Henrik Bjelke (1615-1683), Admiral of the Realm.
- Jørgen Bjelke (1621–1696), Commander-in-chief of the Norwegian army.

== Gallery ==
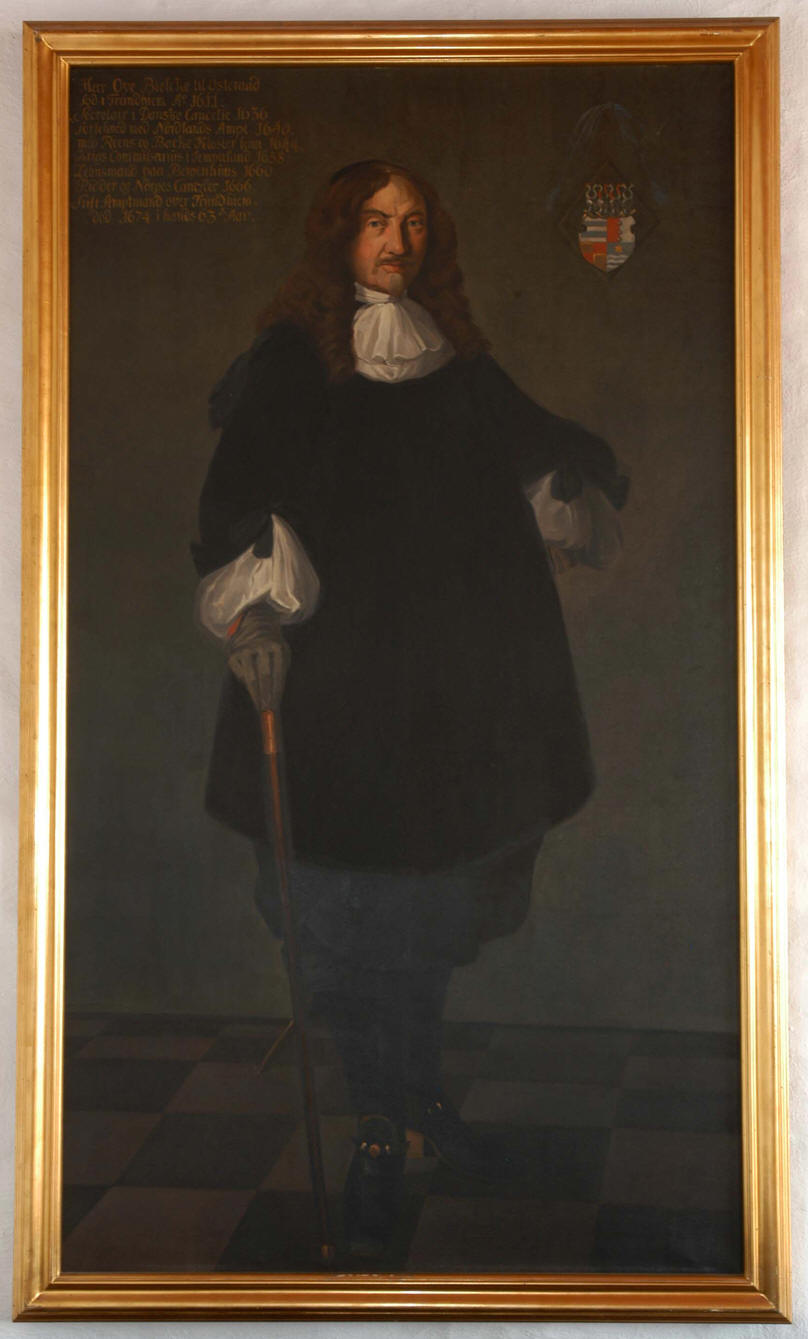
Ove Bjelke.
Unknown painter.

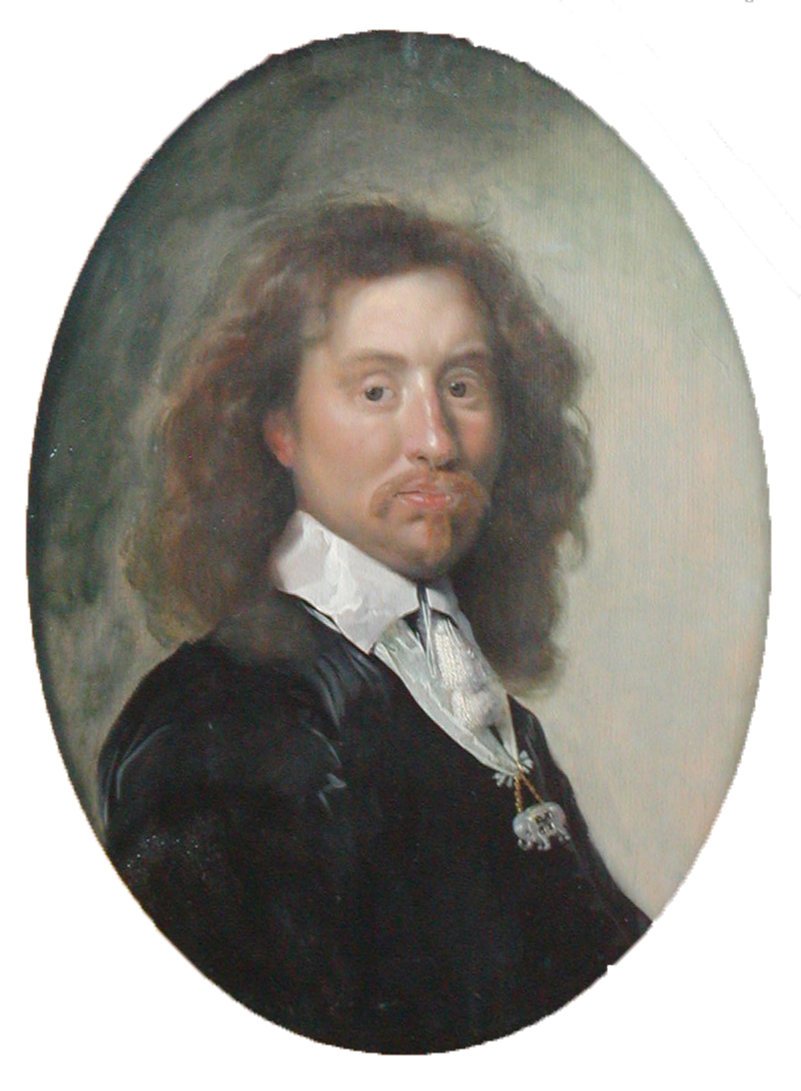
Henrik Bjelke.
Painter: Karel van Mander

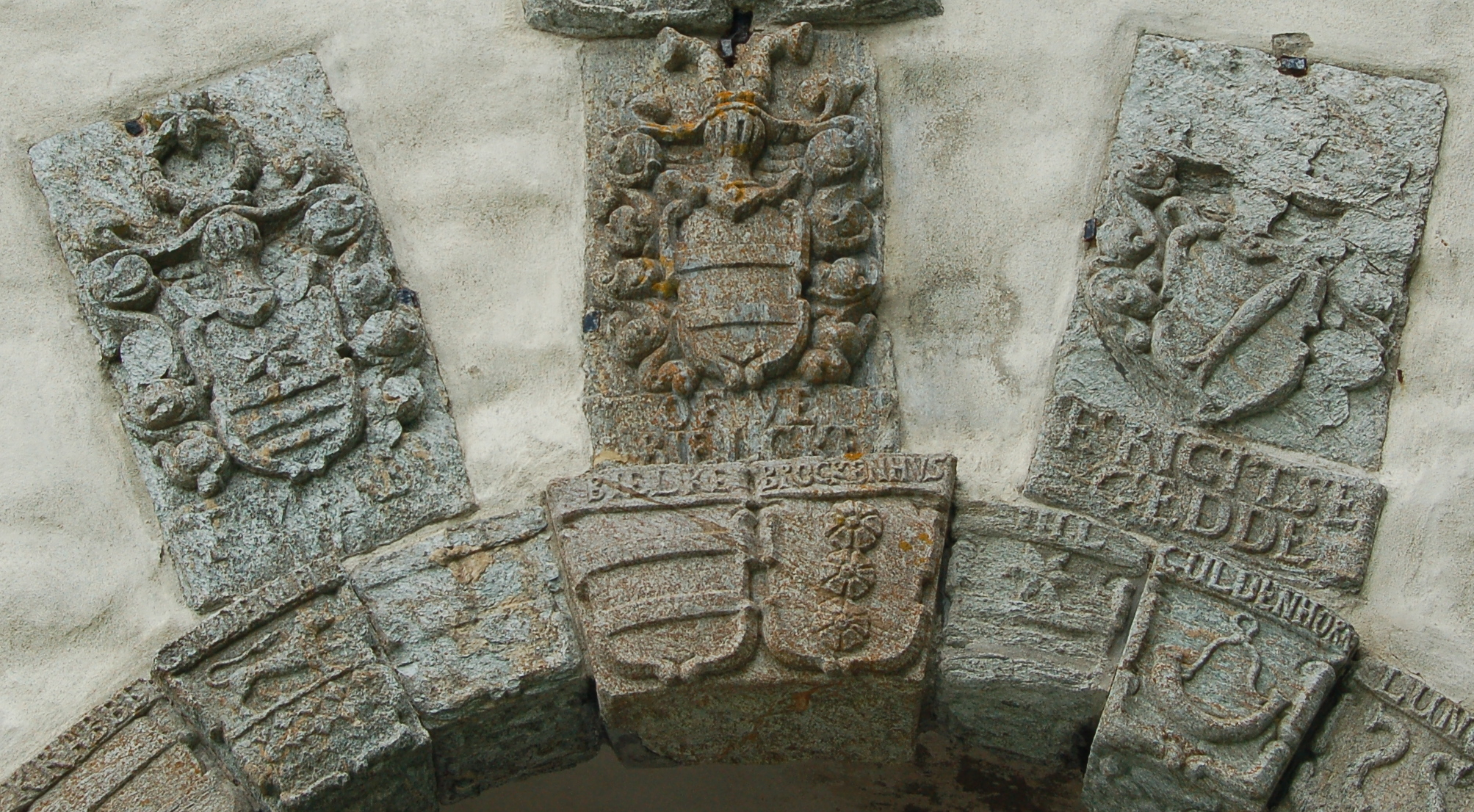
From Austrått: Arms of Juel (left), Bielke, and Giedde.

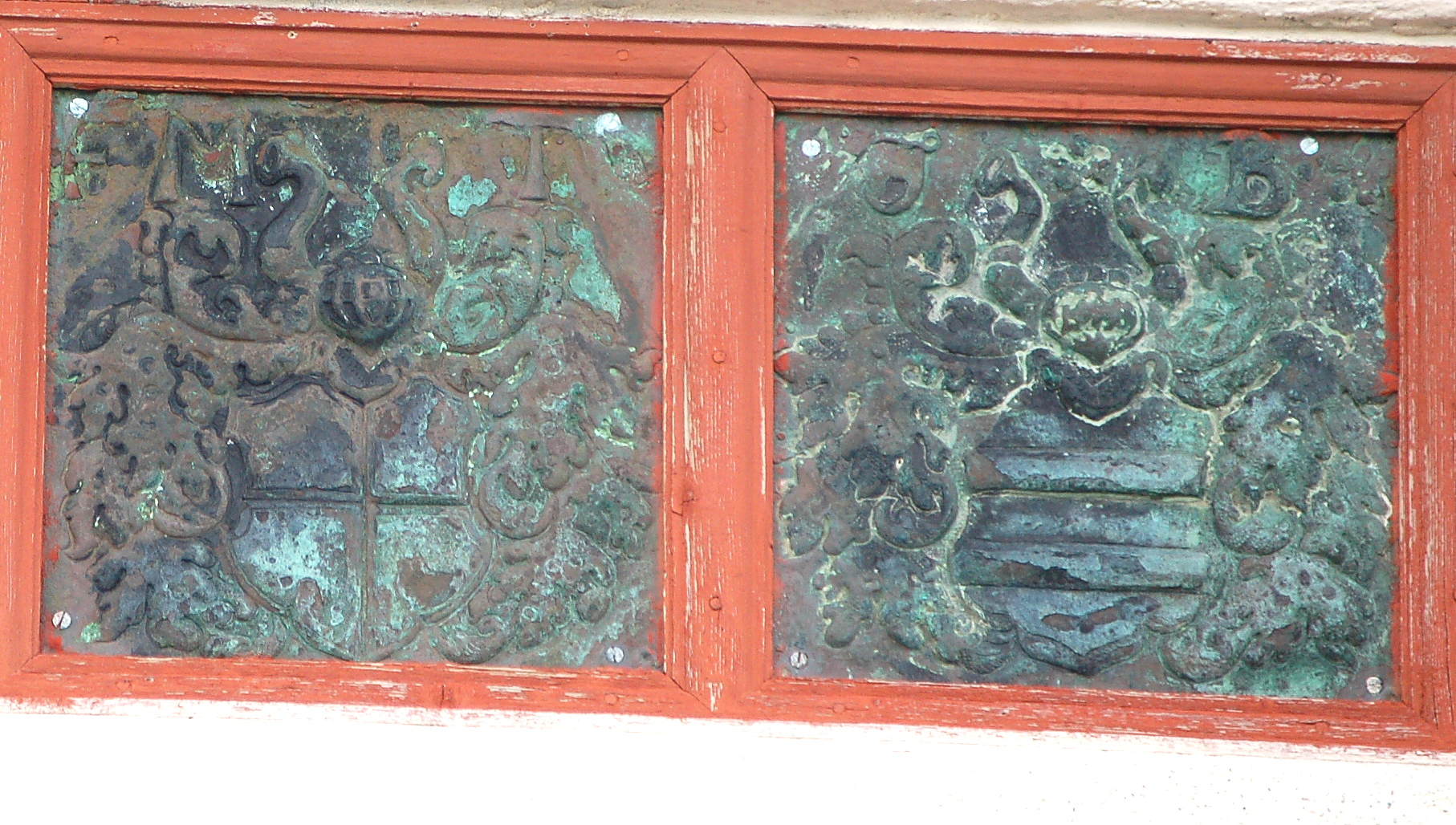
From Austrått: Arms of Tott and Bjelke.

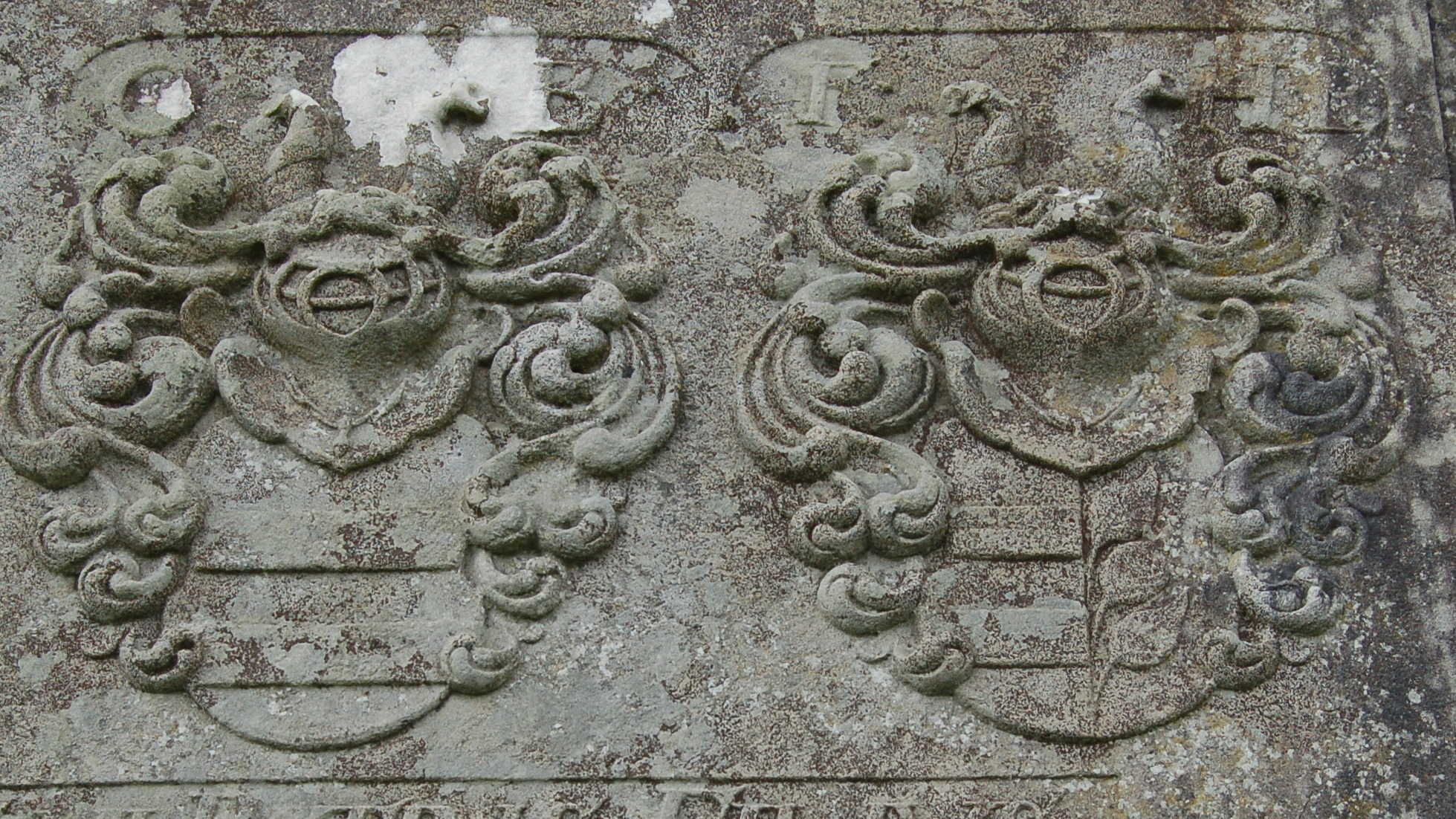
From Austrått: Arms of Bjelke and Lindenow.

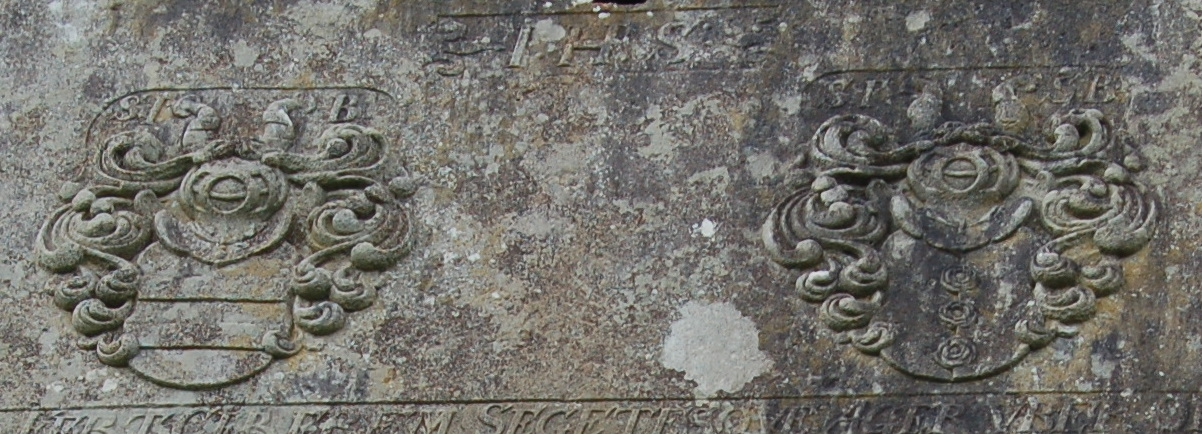
From Austrått: Arms of Bjelke and Brockenhuus.

== See also ==
- Bielke
- Bjelke
- Danish nobility
- Norwegian nobility

== Literature ==
- Danmarks Adels Aarbog
- A. Thiset og P.L. Wittrup: Nyt dansk Adelslexikon, Copenhagen 1904
- Hallvard Trætteberg: Norges våbenmerker. Norske by- og adelsvåben, Kaffe Hag, Oslo 1933
- Sven Tito Achen: Danske adelsvåbener, Copenhagen 1973
