= Elingård =

Manor house and estate in Fredrikstad, Norway

Coordinates: 59°15′08″N 10°48′09″E

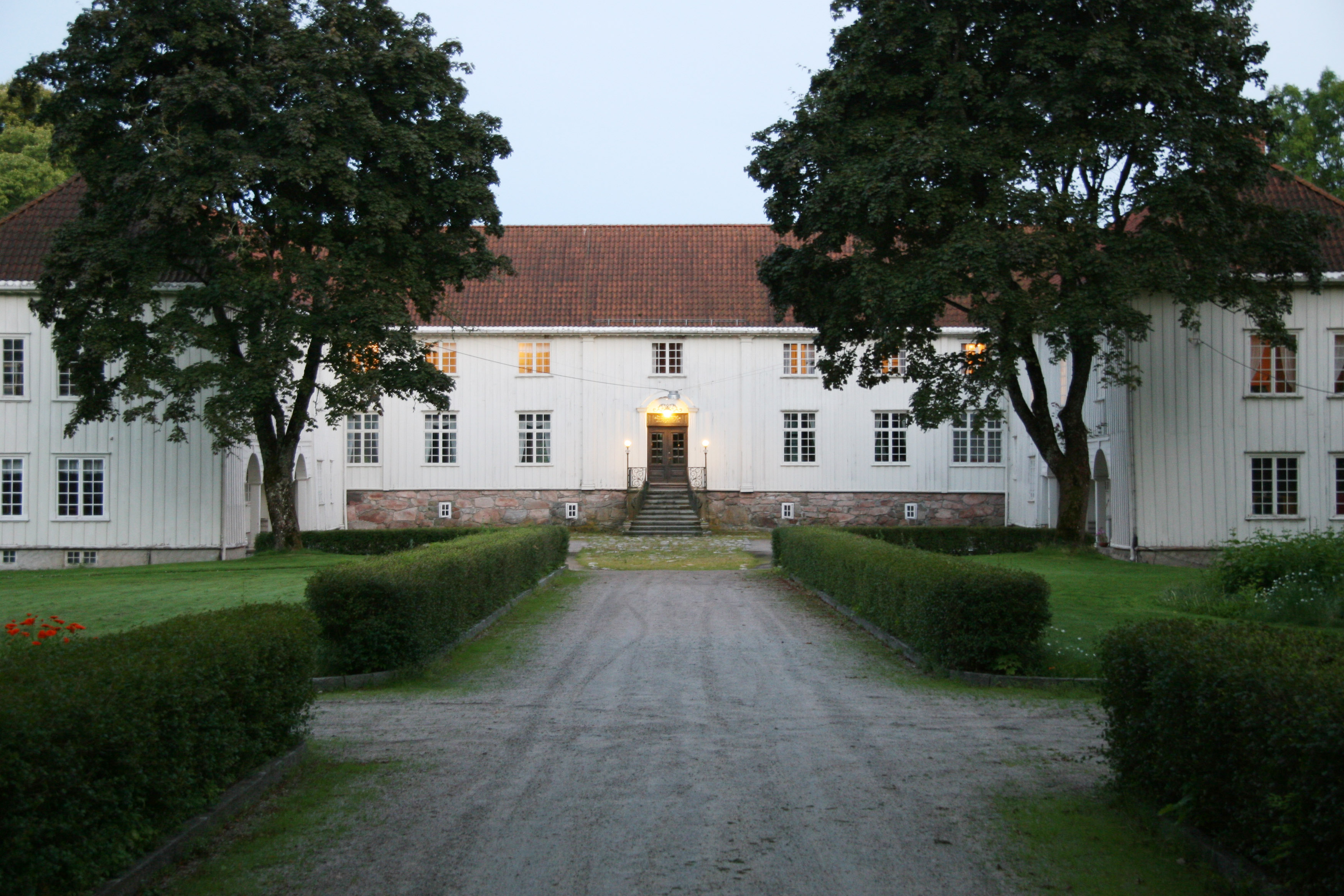
Elingård Manor

Elingård (Elingaard herregård) is a manor house and an estate located at Fredrikstad in Østfold county, Norway. The manor is situated on the Onsøy peninsula outside of Fredrikstad. Elingaard manor is currently operated as a museum.

== History and description ==
The current main building was erected in the Renaissance style and was completed early in 1749. The building was constructed on two floors and consists of a main wing and two side wings. Outside is a garden laid out in the English manner.

Elingård estate was owned by members of the Rosensverd and Gyldenhorn families in the 15th century and of the noble family Brockenhuus in the 16th century. Chancellor of Norway Jens Bjelke acquired the estate through marriage with Sophie Brockenhuus in 1610. With this marriage, he became one of the wealthiest nobles in Norway. It was later inherited by his son, Admiral Henrik Bjelke.

Elingård burned down in 1645. In the 18th century the estate was transferred to the Huitfeldt family through marriage. The main building burned down again in 1746, and the current manor dates from 1749. In 1778 the estate was sold to Hans Møller. It has later had various owners, including Libertas which used the manor as conference center. Elingaard is now owned by Fredrikstad Museum. Elingaard Manor is operated today as a museum and used as venue for social events and by local associations. Since 1 January 2006 it has been a part of Østfold Museum (Østfoldmuseet), which organizes all museums in the county.

== Gallery ==
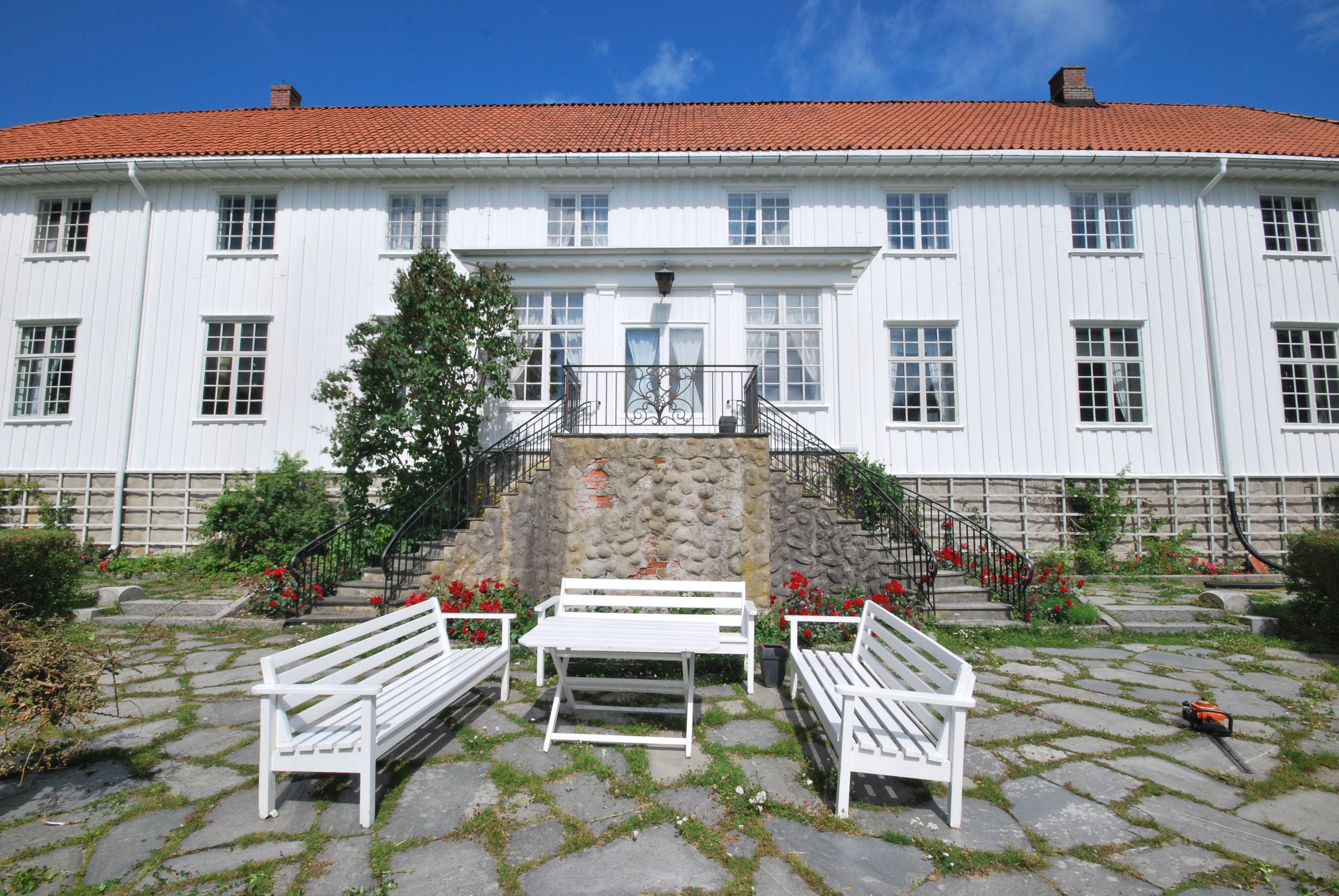
Manor house seen from the garden

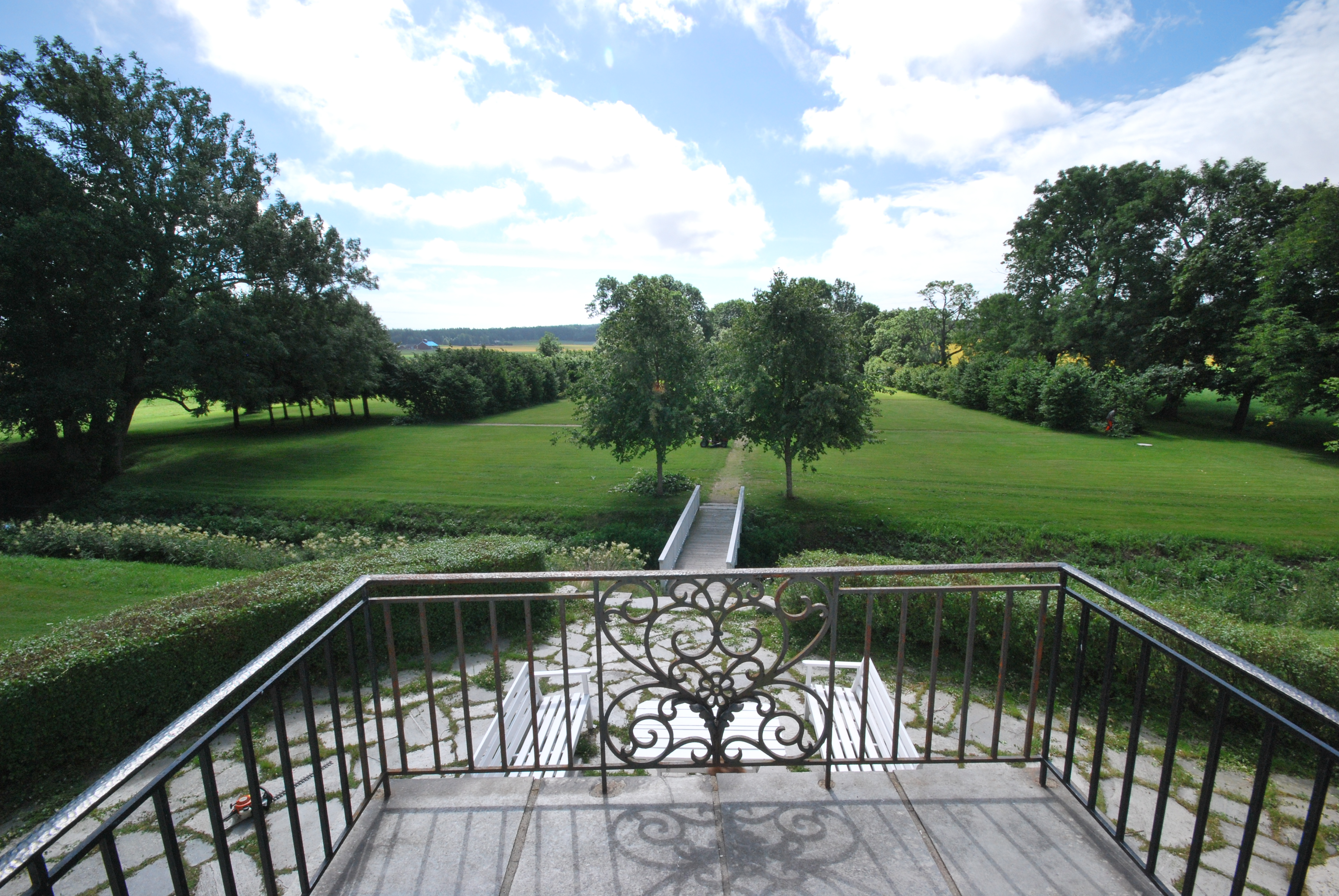
Elingaard manor garden

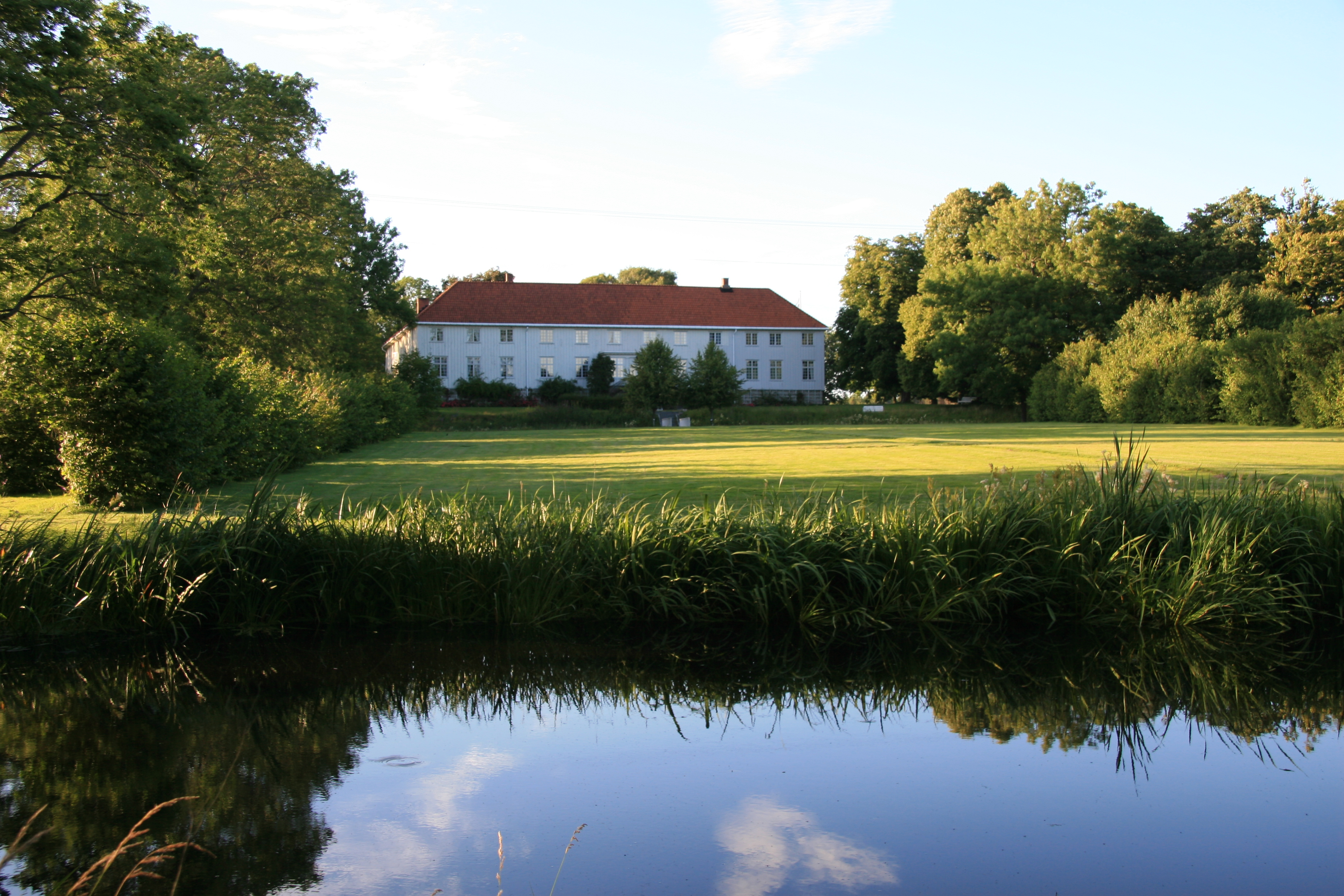
Manor house and pond

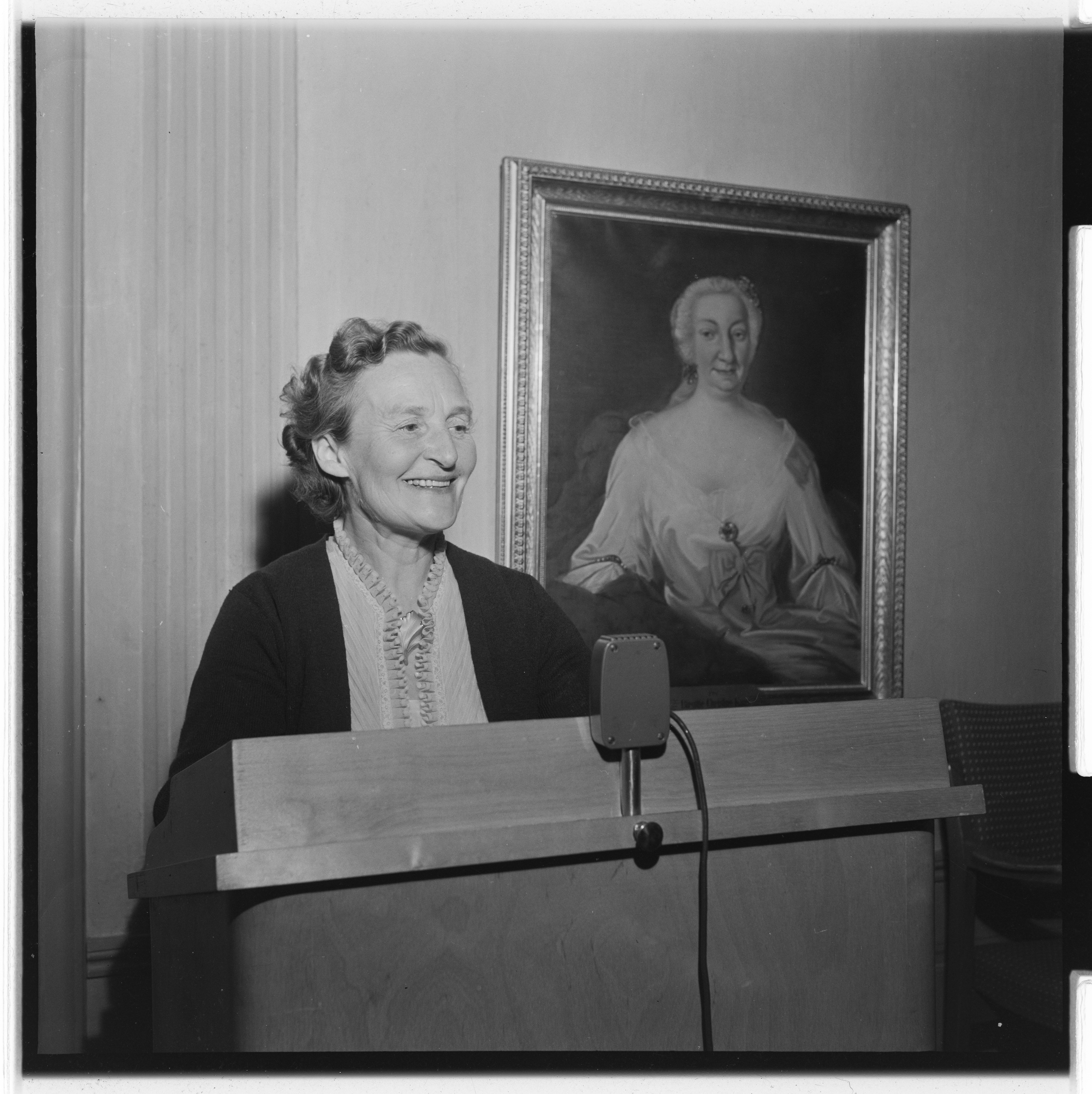
1954 speaker in Elingaard before the portrait of Birgitte Christine Kaas

== Other sources ==
- Borges, Grethe (2007) Elingaard: et gammelt herresete (Oslo: Stiftelsen Elingaard) ISBN 978-82-90301-21-2
