= Gyldenhorn =

Noble family

- Noble family
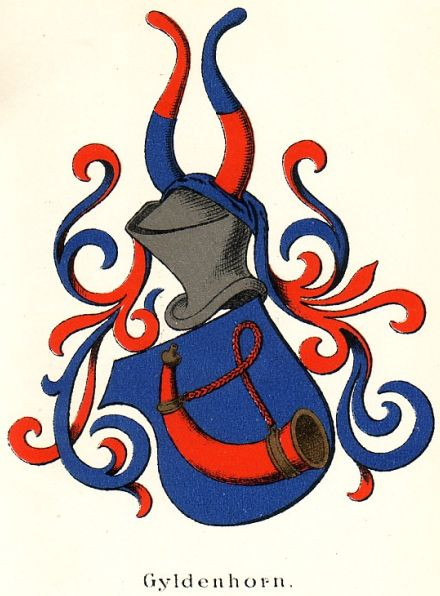
- Country: Norway
- Founded: 1420; 606 years ago
- Founder: Oluf Torsteinssøn til Eline
- Titles: Rigsråd Erik Erikssøn (Council of the State)
- Members: Erik Erikssøn; Olav Ericssøn
- Connected families: Norwegian royal family Gyldenhorn family
- Estates: Elingård, Onsøy; Tronstad, Hurum; Hafslund, Sarpsborg

The Gyldenhorn family was an aristocratic family in The Kingdom of Denmark-Norway originating from Østfold and founded in the 14th century.

The name Gyldenhorn was later given by genealogists after the coat of arms, a golden horn.

== History ==
=== Descent and claims ===
The House was founded in the 14th century by Oluf Torsteinssøn to Eline (Elingård), who lived around 1420, from whom all members descend. The most prominent member of the family was Erik Erikssøn, who in the 1460s was a bailiff in Skien, since a lawyer in Oslo, wrote «to Eline». His son Erik Erikssøn (ca. 1470 – ca. 1535) was a lawman in Oslo, later a commander at Tunsberghus, in 1524 became a ‘Riksråd’ (councillor) and a commander at Båhus castle, and was married to Eline, daughter of councillor Peder Griis. Their daughter Kirsten married the Danish nobleman Eiler Brockenhuus (died 1546).

=== Estate ===
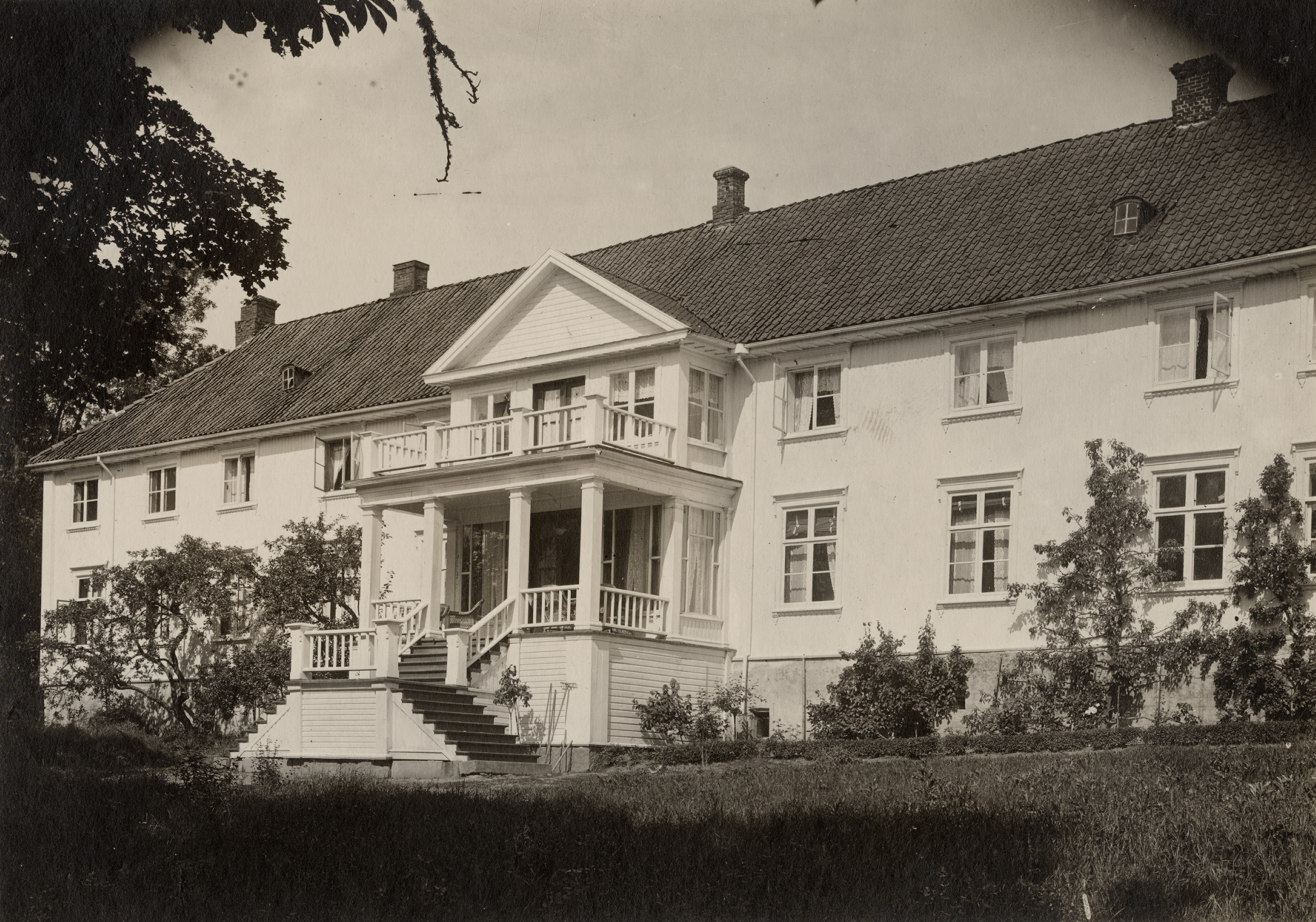
Elingård estate 1920

Elingård is a manor house in Fredrikstad (formerly Onsøy) municipality, about 10 kilometres northwest of the city centre. The farm houses the Elingaard Manor Museum, which is located under the Fredrikstad Museum. The current main building dates from 1749 and has large, vaulted cellars that show the remains of Jens Bjelke's main building, which burned down in 1645. The park contains remains of moats and bastions, also from Jens Bjelke's time.

Elingård was a manor house already in the late Middle Ages. Jon Havtoresson of the Sudrheimsætten, who owned it in the 14th century, possibly inherited it from his father Havtore Jonsson. Around 1460, the farm belonged to the noble family Gyldenhorn, and it came in the 16th century through marriage owned by the Danish nobleman Eiler Brockenhuus. His granddaughter Sophie Brockenhuus married Chancellor Jens Bjelke to Austrått, and Elingård inherited first to their son Admiral Henrik Bjelke, and then to their granddaughter's daughter Sophie von Pultz, who was married to Lieutenant General Henrik Jørgen Huitfeldt. The farm then belonged to his descendants until 1778.

Elingård was haunted by fire in 1645 and again in 1746. In 1824 the estate was bought by Baron Wilhelm Frederik Wedel-Jarlsberg, whose widow sold it in 1855. Elingård then changed owner several times, and the property was subdivided, including the islands Misingen, Rauer and Hankø and several large farms separated.

In 1923, Elingård was bought by contractor Arnt Holm, who laid out approximately 6,000 acres for a zoo for wild boar, fallow deer, hares and birds. The main building is listed from the same year. In 1948, the building with 300 acres of infield and 700 acres of forest was sold to the association Libertas, which restored and modernized the main building and established a study institute for business and economics here, while the rest of the forest is still kept together under the name Elinborg. The farm was taken over by the municipality in 1975 and is open to the public during the summer season two days a week.

=== The name ===
The name Elingård is not certainly explained. In the 15th century, the forms are found in Ælini and a Eline (probably of áll, 'stripe' or ál, 'strap' and wine, 'natural meadow'). Another theory is that the first part is Norse alh, 'sanctuary'.

== Members of the family ==
- Oluf Torsteinssøn, to Eline.
- Erik Erikssøn to Eline.

== Coat of arms ==
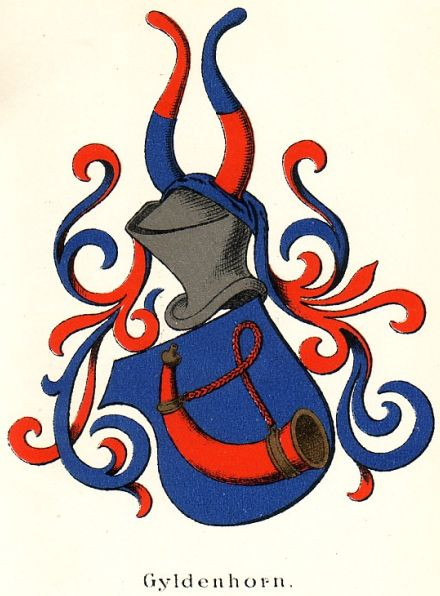
Arms of the Gyldenhorn family.

Arms of the Gyldenhorn family

== Bibliography ==
- Borges, Grethe: ’’Elingaard : et gammelt herresete’’, New edition., 2007, ISBN 978-82-90301-21-2
- Coldevin, Axel: ’’Norske storgårder’’, b. 1, 1950.
- Coldevin, Axel: ’’Elingaard: et gammelt herresete og dets historie’’, 1963.
- Eliassen, Sven G.: Herregårder i Østfold, 1997, ISBN 978-82-7412-049-5
