= Preben von Ahnen =

Norwegian civil servant and landowner (1606–1675)

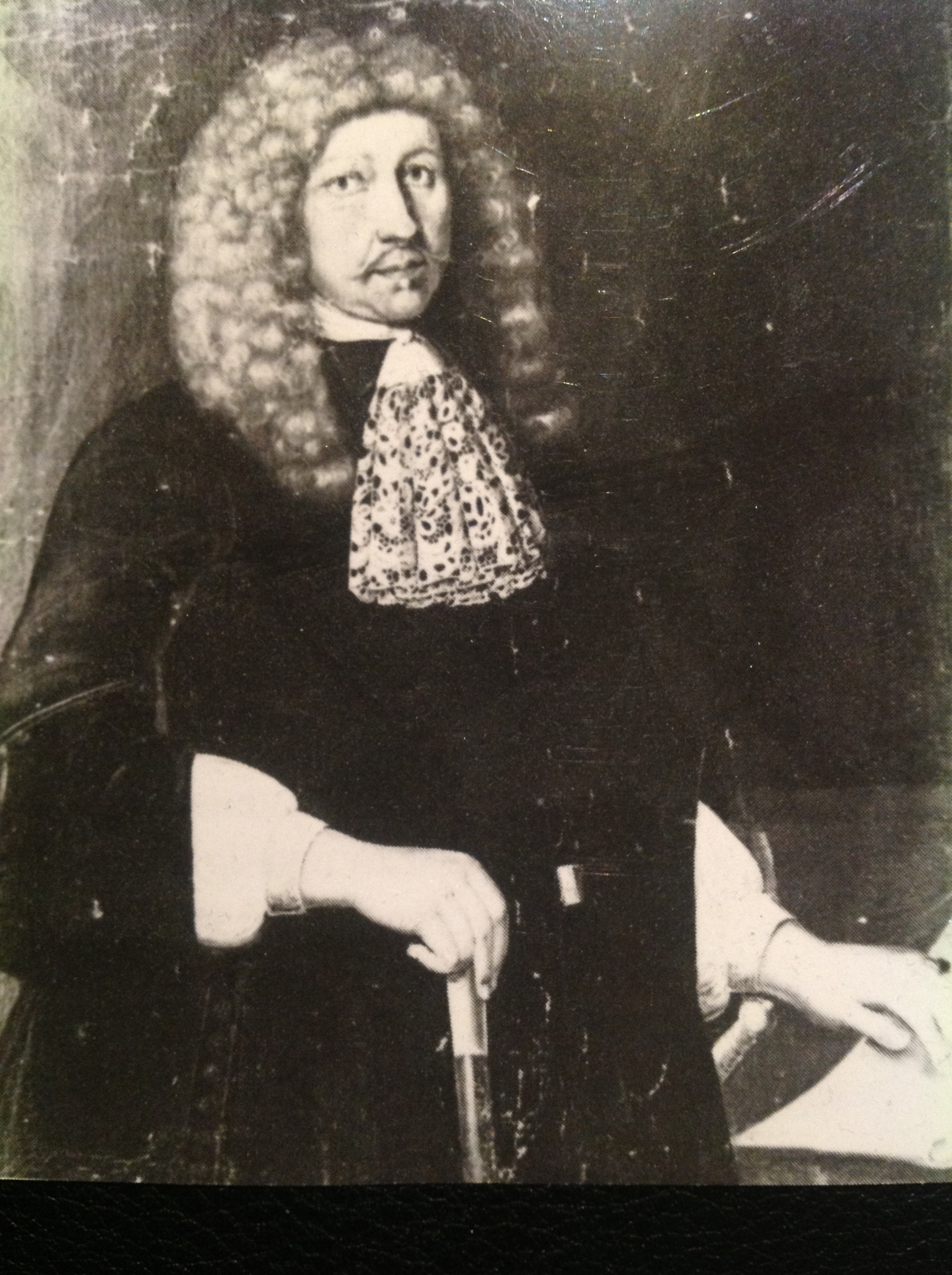
Preben von Ahnen

Preben von Ahnen (18 September 1606 – 15 November 1675) was a civil servant and landowner from Denmark–Norway.

== Biography ==
Preben von Ahnen was born on the island of Rügen, off the Pomeranian coast in the Baltic Sea. He was a son of Pomeranian nobleman Staffen von Ahnen (born c. 1580) and nephew of Claus von Ahnen (c. 1560–1628), who was a bailiff of Sem in Tønsberg in Vestfold and Eiker in Buskerud. He was the father of Iver von Ahnen (1659–1722), a Norwegian military officer who served as Governor of Romsdal.

Preben von Ahnen became a sizable landowner as a result of his two marriages. From his first marriage to Else Urne (1595–1643), he acquired Dønnesgodset på Helgeland, an extensive estate located along the coast of Nordland. Through his marriage in 1657 to his second wife, Karine Iversdatter Vind (1626–1705), he became the owner of Kaupanger Hovedgård in Sogn og Fjordane.

In 1657, he established the iron foundry Ulefos Jernværk at Ulefoss (in the present-day Nome Municipality), together with Ove Gjedde. He served for 20 years as bailiff and district governor in Nordland. He retired from public service as county governor of Bratsberg amt where he had served from 1669 to 1675.

Government offices
Preceded by Johan Frederik von Marschalck	County Governor of Bratsberg amt 1669–1675	Succeeded by Niels Sørensen Adeler
