= Bjelke =

Bjelke is a surname. Notable people with the surname include:

- Bjelke (Dano-Norwegian family)
- Bjelke-Petersen, the name of an Australian family of both Danish and Swedish descent
- Bjelke-Petersen Dam, built 1984–1988, creating the lake called "Barambah" after the original property in the region
- Flo Bjelke-Petersen (1920–2017), Lady Bjelke-Petersen, Australian politician
- Jens Tillufssøn Bjelke, Danish-Norwegian nobleman and a feudal lord of Jemtland, Norway
- Joh Bjelke-Petersen KCMG (1911–2005), New Zealand-born Australian politician
- Koowarta v Bjelke-Petersen, significant court case in the High Court of Australia
- Marie Bjelke Petersen (1874–1969), Danish-born Australian novelist and physical culture teacher

See also Bielke.
