= Siege of Trondheim =

Dano-Norwegian siege of Trondheim in 1658

Coordinates: 63.4269°N 10.4106°E

- Part of the Dano-Swedish War (1658–1660)
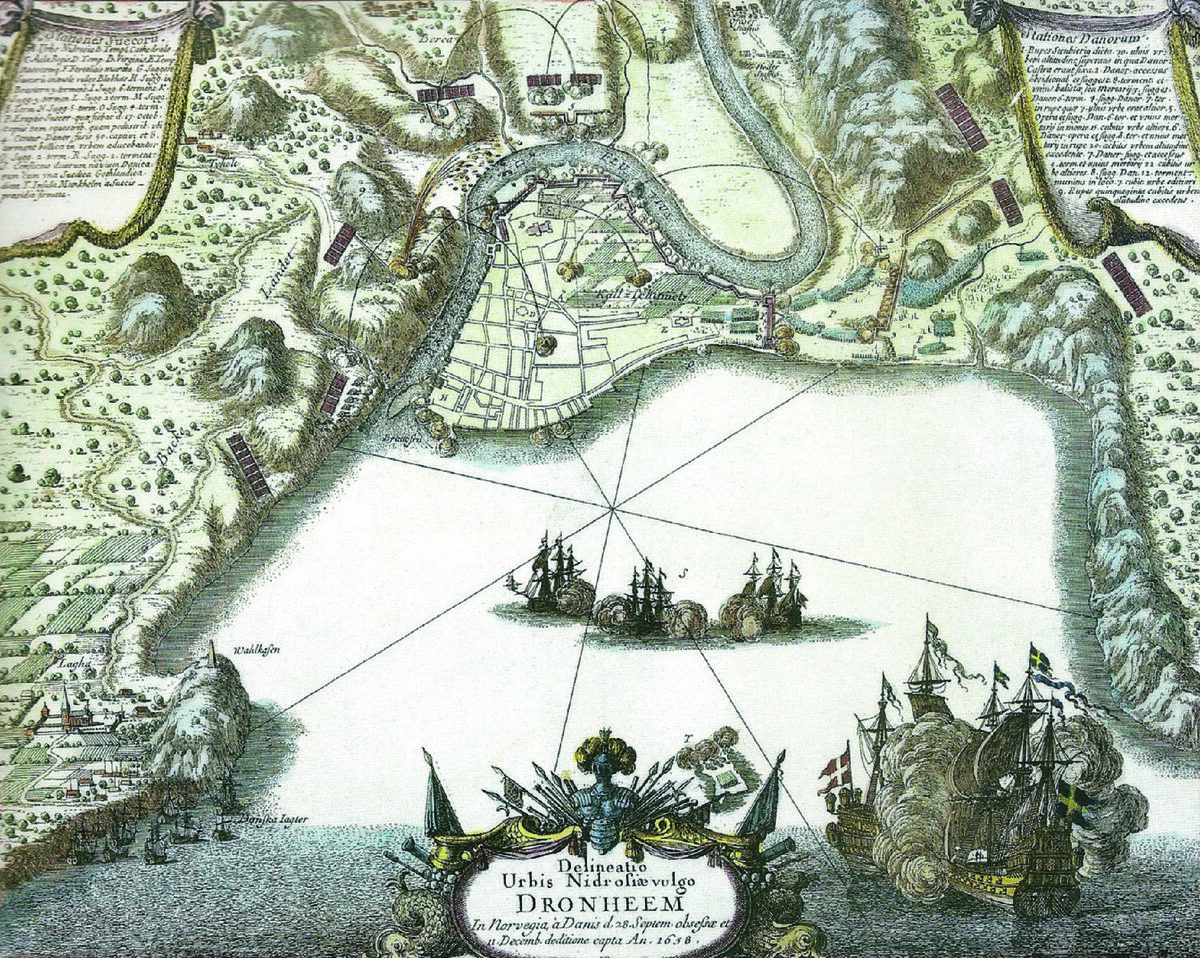
- Map over Trondheim from 1658 showing Bjelkes counteroffensive.
Date	9 September – 21 December 1658
Location	Trondheim
Result	Dano-Norwegian victory
Territorial changes	Trondheim is captured by Denmark–Norway

Belligerents
(yes) Swedish Empire	Denmark–Norway

Commanders and leaders
(Swedish Empire) Axel Posse	(Denmark–Norway) Jørgen Bjelke

Units involved
(Swedish Empire) Trondheim garrison	(Denmark–Norway) Tønsbergske regiment (Denmark–Norway) Vesterlenske regiment

Strength
606 men	At least 2,500 men

Casualties and losses
265 killed (Note: Only 341 survived the siege)	Unknown

The siege of Trondheim was the successful siege and recapture of the city of Trondheim by Norwegian troops in 1658 that had been previously lost with the Treaty of Roskilde.

== Background ==
Lorentz Creutz, the Governor of Dalecarlia, went to Trondheim in May 1658 with 50 cavalry and 480 infantry divided into six companies. His orders were to take control of the city, according to the Treaty of Roskilde. Reinforcements from Hälsingland, Medelpad, and Ångermanland soon joined him. A new governor, Claes Stiernsköld, was appointed, while a commandant, Lieutenant Colonel Axel Posse was appointed to defend the new province with 606 men and eight officers. Due to shortages in Sweden of artillery, gunpowder, and ammunition, meant that Axel lacked many of these.

=== Prelude ===
After the outbreak of the Dano-Swedish War (1658–1660), the Norwegian commander Jørgen Bjelke, immediately marched out to recapture Trondheim. Bielke would raise two new regiments, these being the Tønsbergske regiment in August and the Vesterlenske regiment in October.

== Siege ==
Bielke arranged two expeditionary forces, one from Akershus, which would march towards Trondheim overland, and one from Bergenhus, which moved by sea. On 9 September, some 2,500 Norwegians from Bergenhus landed at Trondheim, supported by land artillery and shipborne artillery from the sea. On 8 October, the force from Akershus arrived as well. Posse and the Swedish garrison, many of whom were ill, did their best to defend the city, which lacked fortifications. However, the burghers soon rose against the Swedes, the ammunition supplies were low to begin, and the defenders were forced to reuse bullets fired into the city, or alternatively buy them from the Trondheim burghers. After a siege of 15 weeks or 3 months, with only three hours of gundpowder left, and shortages of everything else, along with freezing temperatures, Claes Stiernsköld negotiated a surrender for the remaining 341 men, of whom 153 were too ill to move.

== Aftermath ==
A few days after the capitulation, the remaining Swedes in the Trondheim garrison marched out with full military honors. After the siege, Bjelke quickly rushed down to assist Fredrikshald, which the Swedes had made their main attack on.

== Works cited ==
- Johnsen, Arne Odd (1967). Krabbekrigen og Gjenerobringen av Jämtland, 1657–1658 [The Crab War and the reconquest of Jämtland, 1657-1658] (in Norwegian). Gyldendal.
- Lind, Gunner (1994). Hæren og magten i Danmark 1614-1662 [The army and power in Denmark 1614-1662] (in Danish). University Press of Southern Denmark.
- Essen, Michael Fredholm von (2023). Charles X's Wars: Volume 3 - The Danish Wars, 1657-1660. Helion & Company. ISBN 9781915113603.
