= Battle of Møn (1657) =

1657 battle

Coordinates: 54.9535°N 13.0315°E

- Part of Dano-Swedish War (1657–58)
Date	12–13 September 1657
Location	Between Møn and Bornholm, Denmark
Result	Inconclusive

Belligerents
(yes) Swedish Empire	Denmark–Norway

Commanders and leaders
(Swedish Empire) Klas Bjelkenstierna	(Denmark–Norway) Henrik Bjelke (Denmark–Norway) Niels Juel

Strength
25 ships of the line 8 armed merchant ships 2 fireships 4 smaller ships 1,231 cannons 6,000 men	21 ships of the line 7 armed merchant ships 956 cannons 4,640 men

Casualties and losses
40 dead	150 dead

The indecisive naval battle of Møn was a battle during the Dano-Swedish War (1657–1658). A large number of ships was involved, but the fight was not very intense.
