= Ulefos Jernværk =

Iron foundry in Ulefoss, Norway

Coordinates: 59°17′3″N 9°15′30″E

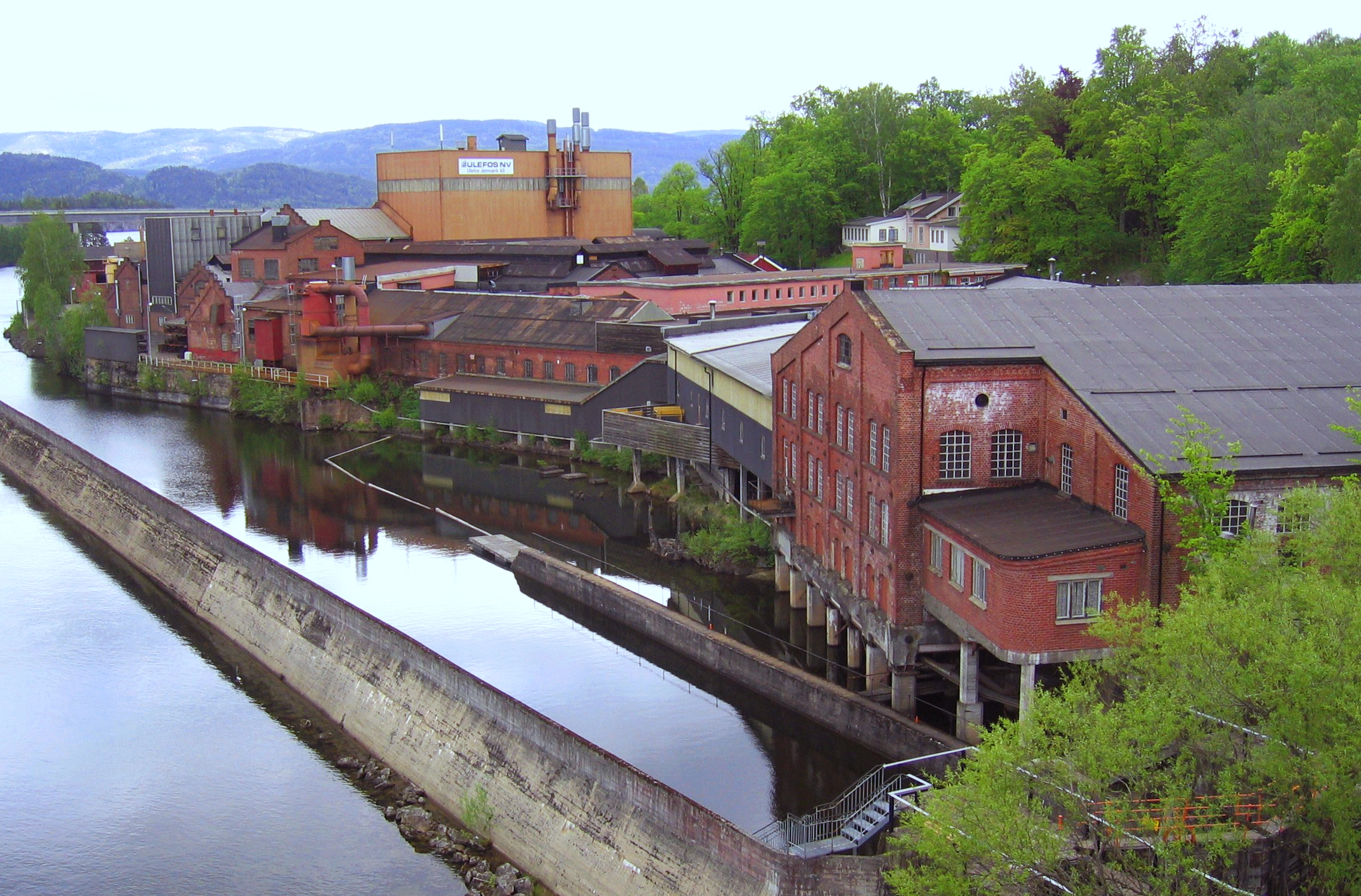
- Ulefos Jernværk in 2007
- Industry: iron foundry

Ulefos Jernværk is an iron foundry located at Ulefoss in Nome Municipality, Norway. It was established in 1657 by Ove Gjedde and Preben von Ahnen. The company produced pig iron until 1877. Wood-burning stoves were important products until the 1950s. From 1999 the foundry is owned by the holding company Ulefos NV.
