= Claus von Ahlefeldt =

Danish-Norwegian nobleman and field marshal

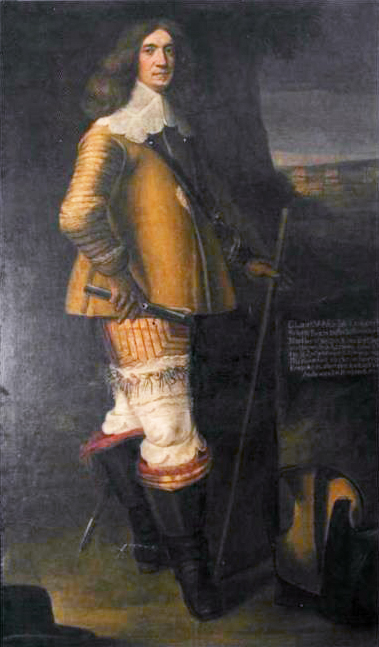
- Born: 2 September 1614; Schloss Gelting, Gelting, Duchy of Holstein
- Died: 15 January 1674 (aged 59)
- Burial place: Nikolaikirche, Kiel
- Military career
- Allegiance: Holy Roman Empire; Denmark-Norway
- Service years: 1630?-1634; 1634-1674
- Rank: Field Marshal
- Commands: Commander-in-chief Norway
- Conflicts: War of the Mantuan Succession; Sack of Mantua; Thirty Years War; Torstenson War; Dano-Swedish War (1657–58); Dano-Swedish War (1658–60); Siege of Copenhagen; Assault on Copenhagen (1659); Battle of Nyborg; Second Anglo-Dutch War; Battle of Vågen
- Awards: Order of the Elephant; Order of the Dannebrog

Claus von Ahlefeldt (1614–1674) was a member of the Ahlefeldt noble family of Holstein, who married the King of Denmark-Norway's natural daughter and rose to become a field marshal in Danish-Norwegian service.

== Early career ==
Ahlefeldt began his military career by serving as a page and an officer in Imperial service, and as an officer in Wallenstein's army. He later became a groom of the bedchamber to King Christian IV of Denmark-Norway. His first wife having died, he was in 1643 betrothed to the King's natural daughter with Vibeke Kruse, Elisabeth Sofie Gyldenløve, although she was only ten; they finally married five years later.

== Senior officer ==
When the war with Sweden began in 1643, Ahlefeldt became first a lieutenant colonel, and soon enough a major general, of cavalry. After the death of Christian IV, he was persecuted by Corfitz Ulfeldt, who had him dismissed from his posts and sent to Glückstadt as commandant. Ahlefeldt supported Frederick III in his struggle with Ulfeldt, and became Generalfeldwachtmeister in 1653. In 1659, Ahlefeldt, by now a lieutenant general, successfully defended the western front of Copenhagen against desperate Swedish attacks during the siege of Copenhagen. He then commanded all Danish forces in Jutland, and took Frederiksodde from the Swedes. In 1660 Ahlefeldt became commander-in-chief of the Norwegian army, as well as Amtmann of Bergenhus len. As such he commanded the Danish-Norwegian forces during the Battle of Vågen, having refused the bribes offered him by the English. During the reign of Christian V, he had the rank, but not the command, of a field-marshal, and was in practice retired to the governorship of Nyborg Slot, and the amtmannship of Nyborg amt.

== Personal life ==
Ahlefeldt was married three times. His first wife, Catharina von Qualen, died in 1639. His second wife, the King's daughter, died in 1654. With her he had a daughter. With his third wife, Anna Hedwig Buchwald, he had five children that reached adult age. He managed his many estates wisely, and acquired great wealth.

Government offices
New office	County Governor of Trondhjems stiftamt 1662–1665	Succeeded by Ove Bjelke
Preceded by Ove Bjelke	County Governor of Bergenhus stiftamt 1665–1666	Succeeded by Georg Reichwein
