= Tønne Huitfeldt =

Norwegian military officer and landowner (1625–1677)

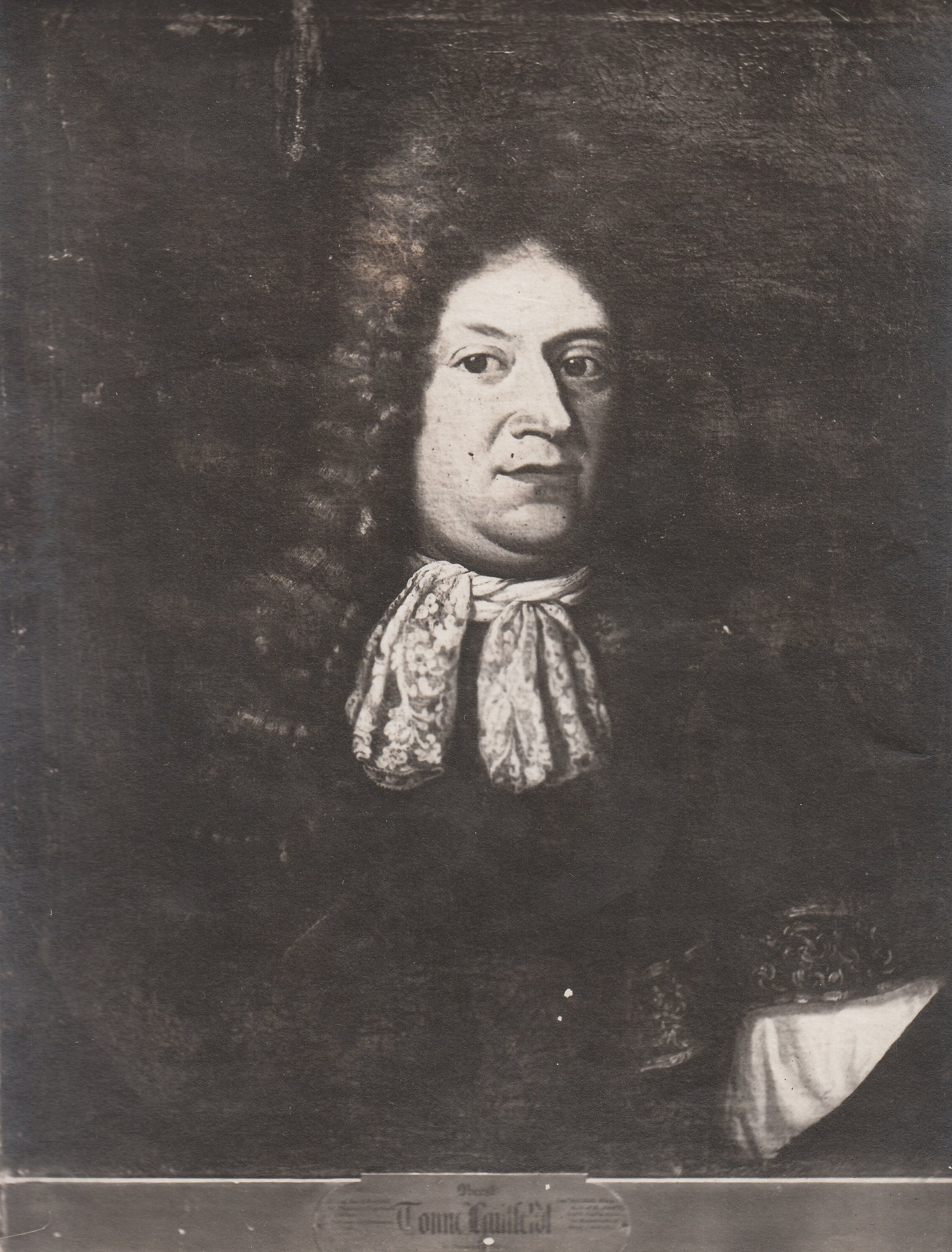
- Born: November 20, 1625; Hurum, Norway
- Died: September 12, 1677 (aged 51)
- Occupation: Military officer

Tønne Huitfeldt (20 November 1625 – 12 September 1677) was a Norwegian military officer and landowner. He is best known for leading the defense of Halden, during the Second Northern War. He was a signatory of the 1661 Sovereignty Act, the new constitution of Denmark-Norway, as one of the representatives of the noble estate.

== Career ==
Tønne Huitfeldt was born in Hurum in Buskerud. In 1644, he was appointed lieutenant governor by Hannibal Sehested, Governor-general of Norway. In 1657, Huitfeld was promoted to lieutenant colonel and chief of the Norwegian soldiers who were sent to Denmark. In 1651, he was appointed captain in the Båhusiske Regiment at Bohus Fortress. In 1659, Huitfeld was appointed a colonel and commander of the defense of Halden. Situated at the mouth of the Tista River on the Iddefjord, Halden is located near the southernmost border crossing between Norway and Sweden. In 1660, the town and fortress came under attack by Swedish army under Field Marshal Lars Kagg. Huitfeld successfully led the defense of the city along with Lieutenant General Jørgen Bjelke. Concurrently, Huitfeldt began construction of fortifications at Fredriksten Fortress which was the citadel of the fortification system.

Huitfeld owned several properties in the region of Oslofjord. Among these were the farms Tronstad (Tronstad gård) at Hurum in Buskerud and Tomb (Tomb Herregård) at Råde in Østfold. Huitfeld was married twice and was the father of Danish-Norwegian naval officer, Iver Huitfeldt.

== Other sources ==
- Huitfeldt, Erik Tønne (1983) Grunnloven og injurievernet (Universitetsforlaget) ISBN 978-8200069836
