= Ove Bjelke =

Norwegian nobleman, feudal lord and statesman

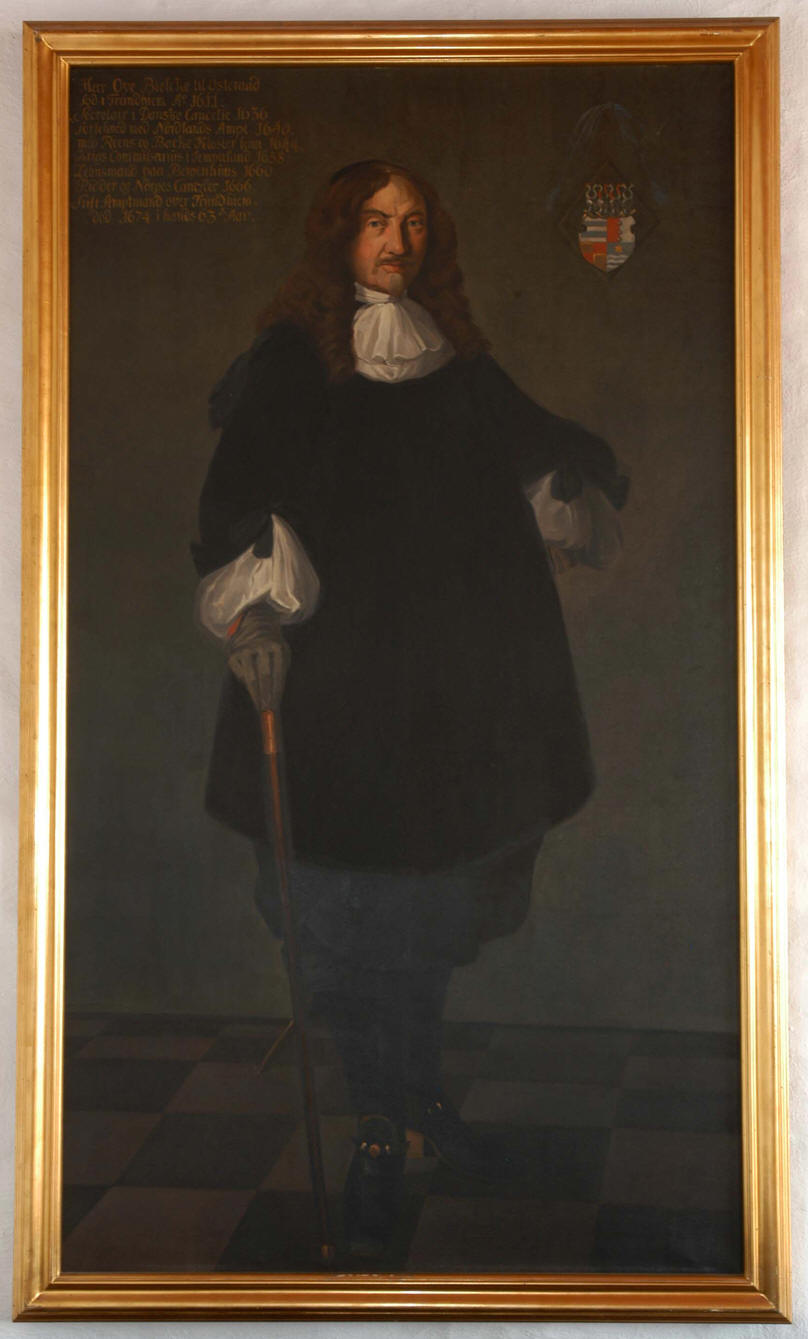

Chancellor of Norway
- In office 1660–1674
- Monarchs: Frederick III; Christian V
- Preceded by: Jens Bjelke
- Succeeded by: Johan Frederik von Marschalck

Governor of Trondhjems stiftamt
- In office 1665–1674
- Governors General: Ulrik Frederik Gyldenløve; Frederik Gabel
- Preceded by: Claus von Ahlefeldt
- Succeeded by: Joachim Frederik Wind

Governor of Bergenhus stiftamt
- In office 1662–1665
- Governors General: Iver Krabbe; Ulrik Frederik Gyldenløve
- Preceded by: Office established
- Succeeded by: Claus von Ahlefeldt

Personal details
- Born: 26 October 1611 Trondheim, Norway, Denmark-Norway
- Died: 29 March 1674 (aged 62) Trondheim, Norway, Denmark-Norway
- Resting place: Austrått Manor
- Spouses: Maren Juel (m. 1643; died 1644) Regisse Gjedde (m. 1647; died 1657) Hedvig Lindenov (m. 1660)
- Parents: Jens Bjelke (father); Sophie Brockenhuus (mother)
- Relatives: Henrik Bjelke (brother); Jørgen Bjelke (brother)
- Education: University of Padua
- Occupation: Nobleman, feudal lord and statesman

Ove Bjelke (26 October 1611 – 29 March 1674) was a Norwegian nobleman, feudal lord and statesman. He served as Chancellor of Norway (1660–1674).

== Biography ==
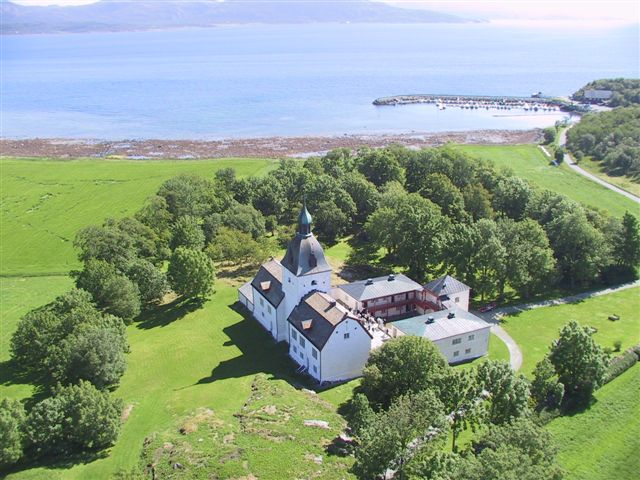
The Renaissance Manor at Austrått (completed around 1656).

He was born in Trondheim; the son of Jens Bjelke (1580–1659) and Sophie Brockenhuus (1587-1656). He was the brother of Henrik Bjelke (1615-1683) and Jørgen Bjelke (1621-1696), both of whom also held prominent positions.

He grew up in a rich and cultured environment. He was educated at the University of Padua in Padua, Italy. His father held the office of Chancellor of Norway from 1614. When his father died in 1659, he took over several of his properties including Austrått manor in Sør-Trøndelag. Much of the manor as it stands today is the result of his efforts. He also served as Chancellor of Norway from 1660. In 1666 he was transferred as staple commander from Bergen to Trondheim. He was a signatory of the 1661 Sovereignty Act (Enevoldsarveregjeringsakten), the new constitution of Denmark-Norway, as one of the representatives of the noble estate.

== Personal life ==
Ove Bjelke was married three times; first time in 1643 with Maren Juel (died 1644), the second time in 1647 with Regitze Geddes (1629-1657), the third time in 1660 with Hedvig Lindenow (1635-1678). He was the father of several daughters.

== Other sources ==
- Andersen. Håkon A. (1992) Austrått (Trondheim: Nordenfjeldske Kunstindustrimuseum) ISBN 82-90502-11-7
- Welle-Strand, Erling (1974) Museums in Norway (Oslo: Royal Ministry of Foreign Affairs) ISBN 8271770039

Government offices
Preceded by Jens Bjelke	Chancellor of Norway; 1660–1674	Succeeded by Johan Frederik von Marschalck
Preceded by Claus von Ahlefeldt	County Governor of Trondhjems stiftamt 1665–1674	Succeeded by Joachim Frederik Wind
New office	County Governor of Bergenhus stiftamt 1662–1665	Succeeded by Claus von Ahlefeldt
