= Henrik Bielke =

Norwegian-Danish military officer

Henrik Bjelke
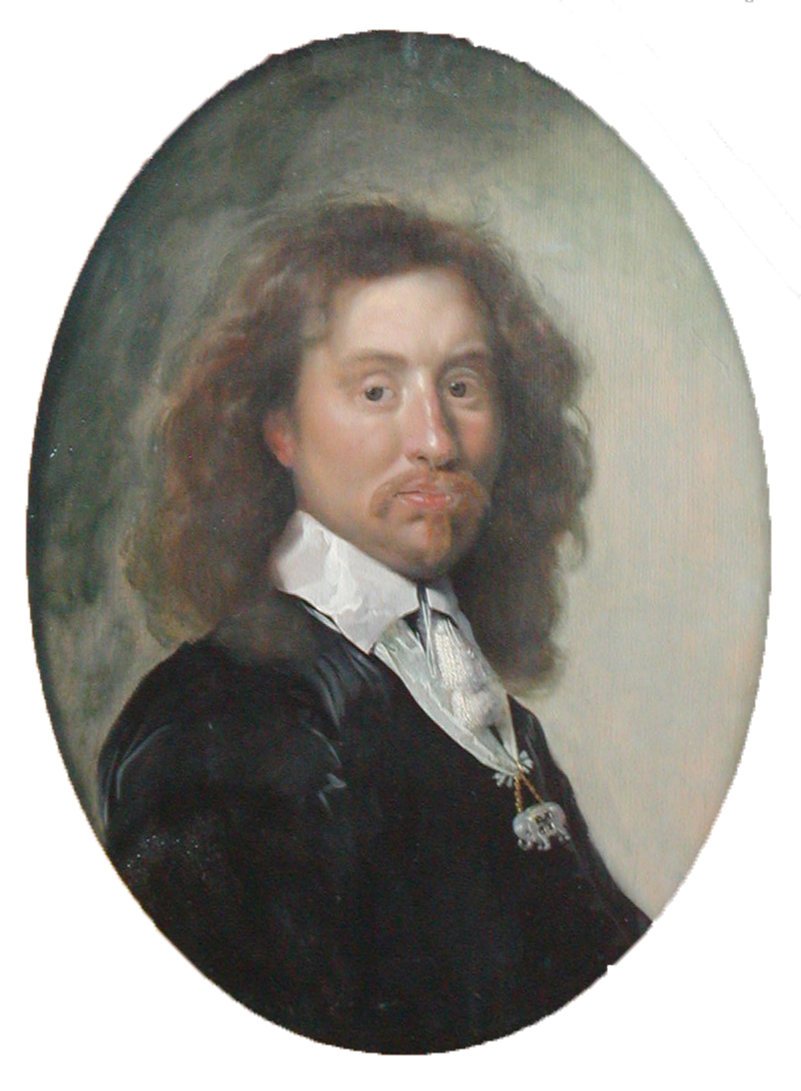
- Portrait of Henrik Bjelke by Karel van Mander III
- Born: 13 January 1615; Elingård, Onsøy, Norway
- Died: 16 March 1683 (aged 68); Copenhagen, Denmark
- Occupation: Admiral of the Realm
- Parent: Jens Bjelke
- Relatives: Ove Bjelke (brother); Jørgen Bjelke (brother)
- Awards: Knight of the Elephant (1648)

Henrik Bjelke (13 January 1615 – 16 March 1683) was a Norwegian-Danish military officer who served as Admiral of the Realm of Denmark-Norway from 1662 to 1679. He was in command of the Royal Dano-Norwegian Navy from 1657 to 1679. He owned the estates Næsbyholm, Bavelse, and Tersløsegaard south of Copenhagen.

== Early life and education ==
Bjelke was born at Elingård Manor on Onsøy in Østfold, Norway. He was the son of Chancellor of Norway Jens Bjelke and Sophie Brockenhuus. He was the brother of Ove Bjelke (1611–1674) and Jørgen Bjelke (1621–1696), both of whom also held prominent positions.

Although while still very young, he enrolled and registered in 1633 in the University of Padua in Italy.

== Career ==
Bielke became a soldier under Frederick Henry, Prince of Orange. He resigned from the service of Frederick Henry when he learned of the invasion of Jutland under the command of Swedish Field Marshal Lennart Torstenson in 1644 and went to Denmark. In March of that year King Christian IV of Denmark-Norway sent him to Norway where he served under Governor-general of Norway Hannibal Sehested. In August 1645, he defended the fortress against a Swedish bombardment.

After the peace agreements of the Second Treaty of Brömsebro (1645), he left to journey abroad and was for a time with Corfitz Ulfeldt in the Netherlands but then went into the service of General Peter Melander Graf von Holzappel in Westfalia. In 1648 he returned to Denmark and was made administrator of Iceland.

In 1653 he was promoted to captain and in 1654 he was sent to Iceland against English pirates. During the Dano-Swedish War (1658–60) along with Niels Juel, he fought the Swedish fleet under the command of Klas Hansson Bjelkenstjerna during the Battle of Møn on 12 September 1657. He earned a seat on the Danish Privy Council in 1666 and was promoted to Riksadmiral in 1662.

== Property ==
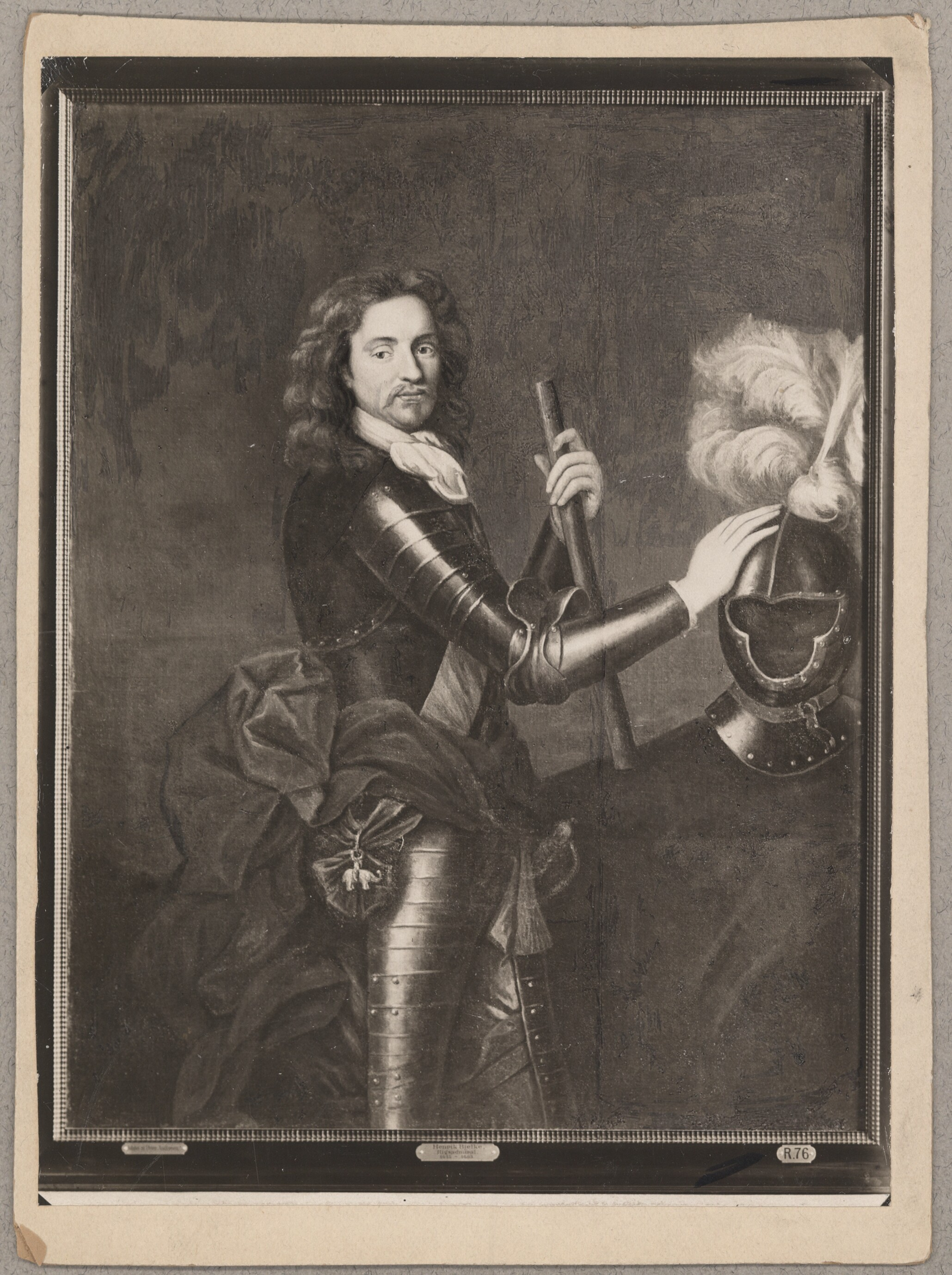
Henrik Bielke.

In 1663, he purchased Næsbyholm, Bavelse, and Tersløsegaard on southern Zealand.

In 1663, Frederick III also granted a property north of Copenhagen to Bjelke and his wife Edel Ulfeldt for life. Five years later, the king created a deed which ceded the property to Edel Ulfeldt and her descendants. It mentions the name "Edelgave" as the name of a future manor house at the site. Bjelke expanded the estate with several new tenant farms prior to its elevation to manor house in 1682. He also constructed a new half-timbered, three-winged main building.

Bjelke also inherited Elingård in Norway. His son, Christoffer, inherited Austråt after his uncle's death in 1674.

== Legacy ==
Henrik Bjelke married Edel Christoffersdatter Ulfeldt (15 March 1630 - 10 January 1676), a daughter of Christoffer Ulfeldt of Svenstorp (1583–1653) and Maren Urup (died c. 1651), on 20 December 1649. He was the father of Christian Frederik Bielke and Christoffer Bielke.

Bjelke died on 16 March 1683 in Copenhagen. He was buried at Næsby Church in Glumsø. Bjelkes Allé in Copenhagen is named after him.

== Works cited ==
- Munthe, Carl Oscar (1901). Hannibalsfejden 1644–1645: Den norske hærs bloddåb [Hannibal's feud 1644–1645: The Norwegian army's blood baptism] (in Danish). Oslo: Grøndahl & Søns bogtrykkeri.
