= Onsøy =

Peninsula in Østfold, Norway

Coordinates: 59°15′N 10°51′E

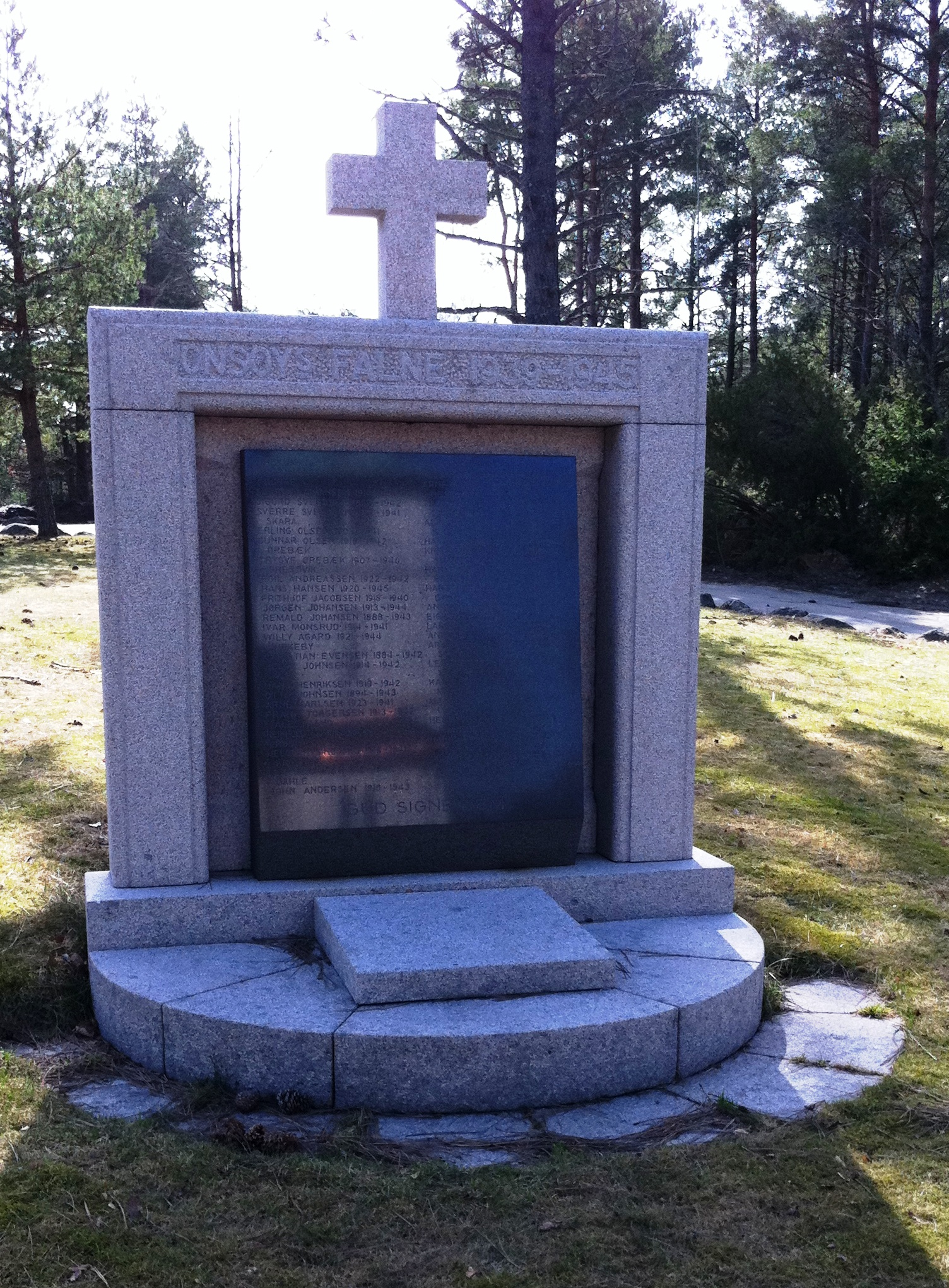
World War II memorial at Onsøy

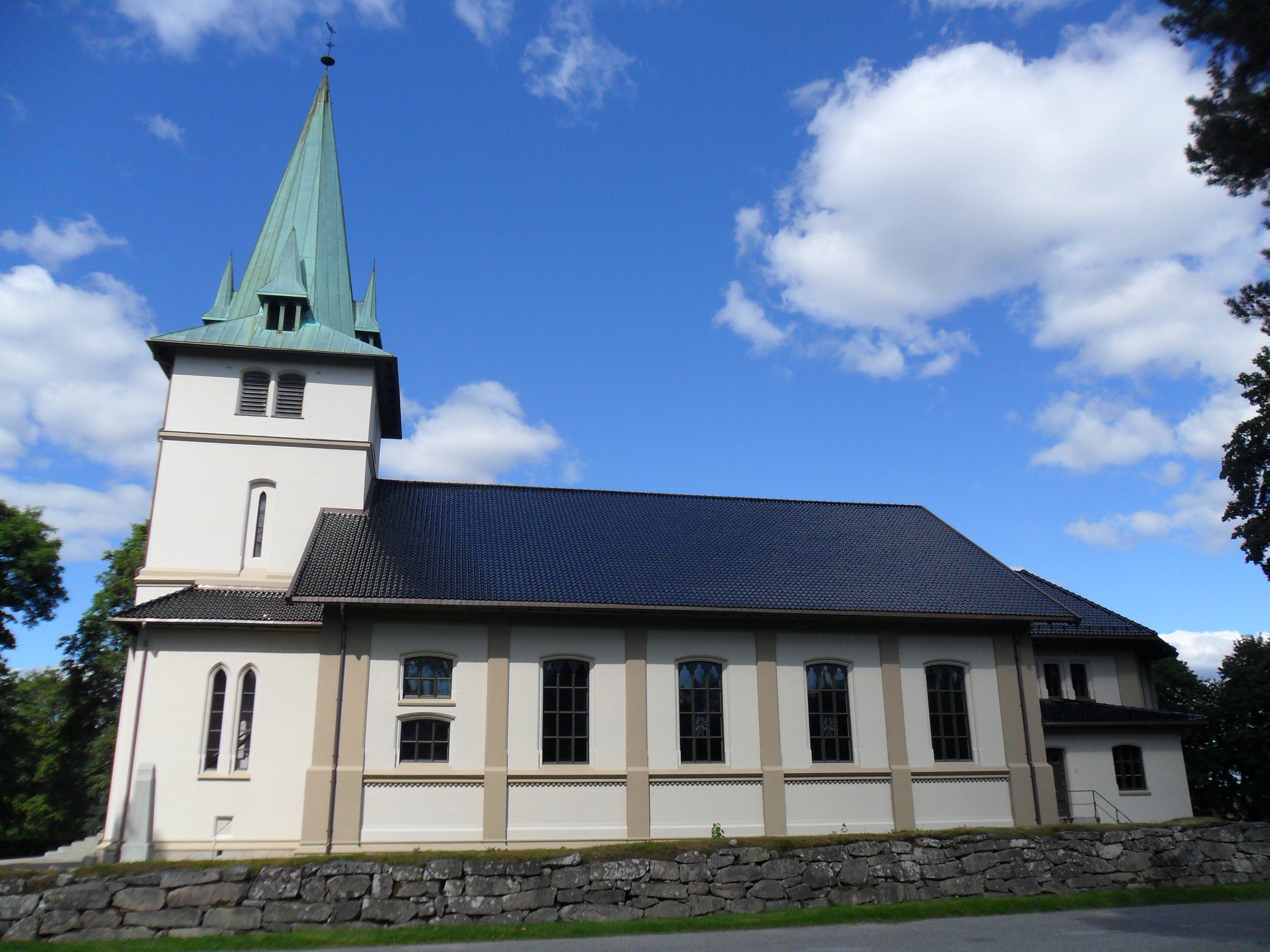
Onsøy Church

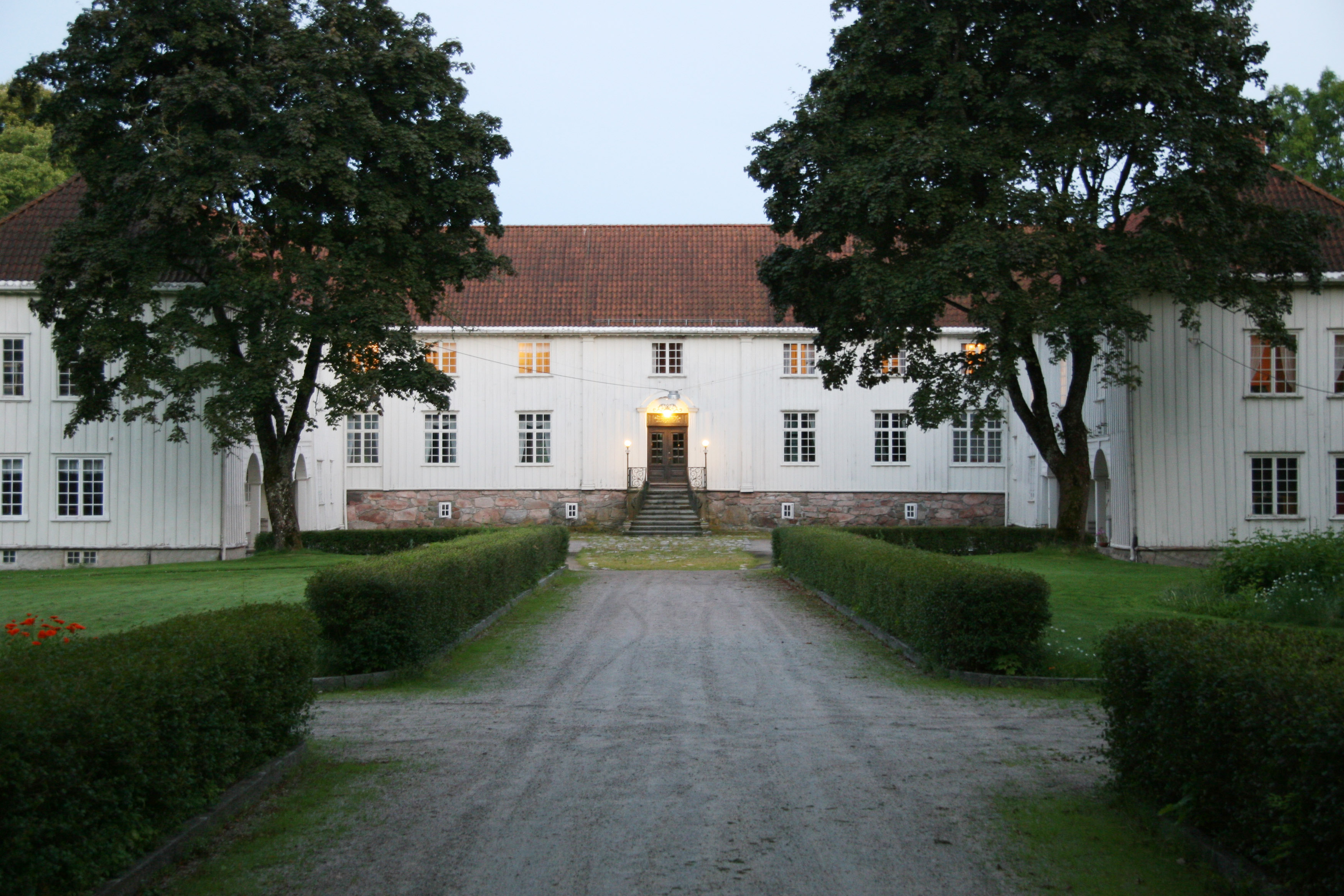
Elingaard Manor

Onsøy is a peninsula and a former municipality in Østfold county, Norway. The administrative centre was Gressvik.

== History ==
The parish of Onsø was established as a municipality on January 1, 1838 (see formannskapsdistrikt). A part of Onsøy with 170 inhabitants was merged into the neighboring municipality Fredrikstad on 1 January 1968.

On 1 January 1994 the rest of Onsøy was incorporated into Fredrikstad. Prior to the merger, Onsøy had a population of 12,923.

== Etymology ==
The Old Norse form of the name was Óðinsøy. The first element is the genitive case of the name of the god Odin, the last element is øy meaning 'island'. The former island was later turned into a peninsula because of post-glacial rebound.

== Onsøy Church ==
Onsøy Church (Onsøy kirke) was built in 1877. The architect was Henrik Thrap-Meyer. The church is of Gothic Revival style and constructed of brick with has 375 seats. Onsøy Church is located in Fredrikstad parish. Jens Bjelke was buried in the churchyard.

== Elingaard Manor ==
Elingaard Manor (Elingaard herregård) is a manor house located on Onsøy. The current main building was erected in the Renaissance style and was completed early in 1749. The building was constructed on two floors and consists of a main wing and two side wings. Outside is a garden laid out by English model. The manor house was developed by Chancellor Jens Ågessøn Bjelke (1580–1659). Jens Bjelke, one of the wealthiest men in Norway, was the grandson of Jens Tillufssøn Bjelke and the father of Jørgen Bjelke. His elder son Admiral Henrik Bjelke (1615–83) inherited Elingaard Manor. Elingaard manor is currently operated as a museum.

== Farms of Onsøy ==
Onsøy is a former municipality in the Norwegian county (fylke) of Østfold, in the region of Østlandet. Østfold was known from 1662 to 1919 as Smaalenenes county (amt). Currently it is part of the municipality of Fredrikstad, which was established in 1838 and merged with the municipality of Glemmen in 1964. A small portion of Onsøy was switched to Fredrikstad in 1968, and the remainder of Onsøy joined Fredrikstad in 1994, along with the municipalities of Borge, Onsøy, Kråkerøy, and Rolvsøy. From 1070 to 1968, Onsøy was a parish in the Oslo diocese; since 1969 it has been part of the Borg diocese. From 1559 to 1660 it was part of what was then known as Akershus county (len).

=== Maps of the farms of Onsøy ===
Coordinates are approximate.
Note that each map has a maximum number of listings it can display, so the map has been divided into parts consistent with the enumeration districts (tellingskrets) in the 1920 census. This map will include one farm (gaard) name per farm number; other farm names or subdivision numbers may exist.

Onsøy municipality, tellingskrets 1-4 from 1920 census
Farms:
1 1: Ørmenneset
2 2: Havnen
3 6: Ørmen sæter
4 8: Høyum
5 10: Mollestad
6 11: Krabberød
7 12: Svierød
8 13: Fosse
9 14: Ammundrød
10 15: Torbjørnrød
11 35: Kjølberg
12 36: Kjevelsrød
13 37: Ingulsrød
14 38: Strand nedre
15 39: Krabberød
16 16: Valle nordre
17 17: Ulvedalen
18 18: Valle sondre
19 19: Ørmenveien
20 20: Ek
21 21: Slottet
22 22: Skogen
23 23: Mossigrød
24 24: Mossig nordre
25 26: Mossighuset
26 27: Kolberg nordre
27 29: Kolberghuset
28 31: Torp
29 32: Skuggerødmyren
30 33: Borge mellem
31 34: Borge østre
32 40: Skaare
33 41: Skaare mellem
34 42: Skaare søndre
35 43: Dale
36 44: Ørebæk vestre
37 45: Ørebæk østre
38 46: Brekke
39 47: Hurrød
40 Onsøy kirke (church), built 1877

Tellingskrets (enumeration districts): 1: gaards 1-15 (lime); 2: Haredalen, gaards 35-39 (black); 3: gaards 16-34 (blue); 4: Åle gnr. 40-47 (green)

Onsøy municipality, tellingskrets 5-11
Farms:
1 48: Græsvik
2 49: Hauge
3 50: Aale øvre
4 51: Aale nedre
5 52: Rød
6 53: Okseviken
7 54: Krosnes
8 55: Viker
9 56: Fjelle store
10 57: Dale lille
11 58: Langeteig
12 59: Elslet
13 60: Torgauten
14 61: Søstrene
15 62: Nøklegaard
16 63: Oksrød
17 64: Slevik østre
18 65: Mellegaard
19 66: Slevik vestre
20 67: Langgaard
21 68: Dyrød
22 69: Halvorsrød
23 70: Brekke
24 71: Fjelle lille
25 72: Stenakrød
26 73: Gløsen
27 74: Fuglesangen
28 75: Tvete østre
29 76: Tvete vestre
30 77: Kjenne østre
31 78: Kjenne vestre
32 79: Lere
33 80: Lilleng
34 81: Torp søndre
35 82: Lund store
36 83: Lund lille

Tellingskrets (enumeration districts): 5: Græsvik (lime); 6: Hauge (black); 7: Aale nedre og Rød (green); 8: Okseviken - Krosnes - Viker (red); 9: gaards 56 Fjelle store to 63 Oksrød (purple); 10: Slevik (teal); 11: gaards 74 Fuglesangen to 83 Sund lille (blue)

Onsøy municipality, tellingskrets 12, 14, 15
Farms:
1 84: Øtne østre
2 85: Øtne vestre
3 86: Skollerød
4 87: Sanderup
5 88: Stene lille
6 89: Stene store
7 90: Hauge søndre
8 91: Hauge nordre
9 92: Gjølberg
10 93: Forsetlund søndre
11 94: Forsetlund store
12 95: Forsetlund nordre
13 96: Bossum søndre
14 97: Bossum mellem
15 98: Bossum nordre
16 99: Lund vestre
17 100: Huseby store
18 101: Huseby lille
19 102: Ellinggaard
20 103: Espesti
21 104: Ytterstad
22 105: Hankø
23 106: Rauø
24 107: Smauet
25 108: Haviken
26 109: Rød vestre
27 110: Gaustad nedre
28 111: Tvete østre
29 112: Engelsviken
30 113: Skontorp
31 114: Stene vestre
32 115: Manstad
33 116: Husløs søndre
34 117: Lervik
35 118: Skjælø
36 119: Husløs nordre
37 120: Berge
38 121: Kjære
39 122: Koret
40 123: Kallerød
41 124: Østenstad
42 125: Saltnes mellem
43 126: Solberg
44 127: Røtne

Tellingskrets (enumeration districts): 12: Stene (lime); 14: gaards 106 Rauø to 112 Engelsviken (black); 15: Manstad (blue)

=== Farm names and numbers ===
Following are the farms in the Onsøy (formerly Smaalenes) municipality, as they are listed in O. Rygh's series Norske_Gaardnavne ("Norwegian farm names"), the Smaalenes volume of which was published in 1897. Here is a digital version of that volume: <>

The farm numbers are used in some census records, and numbers that are near each other indicate that those farms are geographically proximate. Handwritten Norwegian sources, particularly those prior to 1800, may use variants on these names. For recorded variants before 1723, see the digital version of O. Rygh. Note that the 1920 census records mapped above may not match O. Rygh. Additional farm numbers missing from the O. Rygh record were found in the 1950 Draft Land Registry.

Farm names were often used as part of Norwegian names, in addition to the person's given name and patronymic or inherited surname. Some families retained the farm name, or toponymic, as a surname when they emigrated, so in those cases tracing a surname may tell you specifically where in Norway the family was from. This tradition began to change in the mid to late 19th century, and inherited surnames were codified into law in 1923.

Farm Name	Farm Number
Ørmenneset	1
Havnen	2
Ørmen	3
Ørmen sæter	6
Høyum	8
Mollestad	10
Krabberød	11
Svierød	12
Fosse	13
Ammundrød	14
Torbjørnrød	15
Valle nordre	16
Ulvedalen	17
Valle søndre	18
Onsø Præstegaard	19
Ek	20
Slottet	21
Skogen	22
Mossigrød	23
Mossig nordre	24
Mossig søndre	25
Mossighuset	26
Kolberg nordre	27
Kolberg søndre	28
Kolberghuset	29
Torp vestre	30
Torp østre	31
Skuggerødmyren	32
Borge Mellem	33
Borge østre	34
Kjølberg	35
Kjevelsrød	36
Ingulsrød	37
Strand nedre	38
Krabberød	39
Skaare nordre	40
Skaare mellem	41
Skaare søndre	42
Dale	43
Ørebæk vestre	44
Ørebæk østre	45
Brekke	46
Hurrød	47
Græsvik	48
Hauge	49
Aale øvre	50
Trondalen	51
Rød	52
Okseviken	53
Krosnes	54
Viker	55
Fjelle store	56
Dale lille	57
Langeteig	58
Elslet	59
Torgauten	60
Søstrene	61
Nøklegaard	62
Oksrød	63
Bjorkjønlien	64
Mellegaard	65
Slevik vestre	66
Langgaard	67
Dyrød	68
Halvorsrød	69
Brekke	70
Fjelle lille	71
Stenakrød	72
Solbrekke	73
Fuglesangen	74
Tvete østre	75
Tvete vestre	76
Kjenne østre	77
Kjenne vestre	78
Lere	79
Lilleng	80
Torp søndre	81
Lund store	82
Lund lille	83
Øtne østre	84
Øtne vestre	85
Skollerød	86
Sanderup	87
Stene lille	88
Stene store	89
Hauge søndre	90
Hauge nordre	91
Gjølberg	92
Forsetlund søndre	93
Hageengen	94
Forsetlund nordre	95
Bossum søndre	96
Bossum mellem	97
Bossum nordre	98
Lund vestre	99
Huseby store	100
Huseby lille	101
Ellinggaard	102
Espesti	103
Ytterstad	104
Hankø	105
Rauø	106
Smauet	107
Haviken	108
Rød vestre	109
Gaustad nedre	110
Gaustad øvre	111
Engelsviken	112
Skontorp	113
Stene vestre	114
Manstad	115
Husløs søndre	116
Lervik	117
Skjælø	118
Husløs nordre	119
Berge	120
Kjære	121
Koret	122
Kallerød	123
Østenstad	124
Saltnes mellem	125
Solberg	126
Røtne	127

== Other sources ==
- Borges, Grethe (2007) Elingaard : et gammelt herresete (Fredrikstad] : Fredrikstad museum) ISBN 978-82-90301-21-2
- Dag Jukvam / Statistics Norway (1999). "Historisk oversikt over endringer i kommune- og fylkesinndelingen".
