= Jens Bjelke =

Norwegian nobleman (1580–1659)

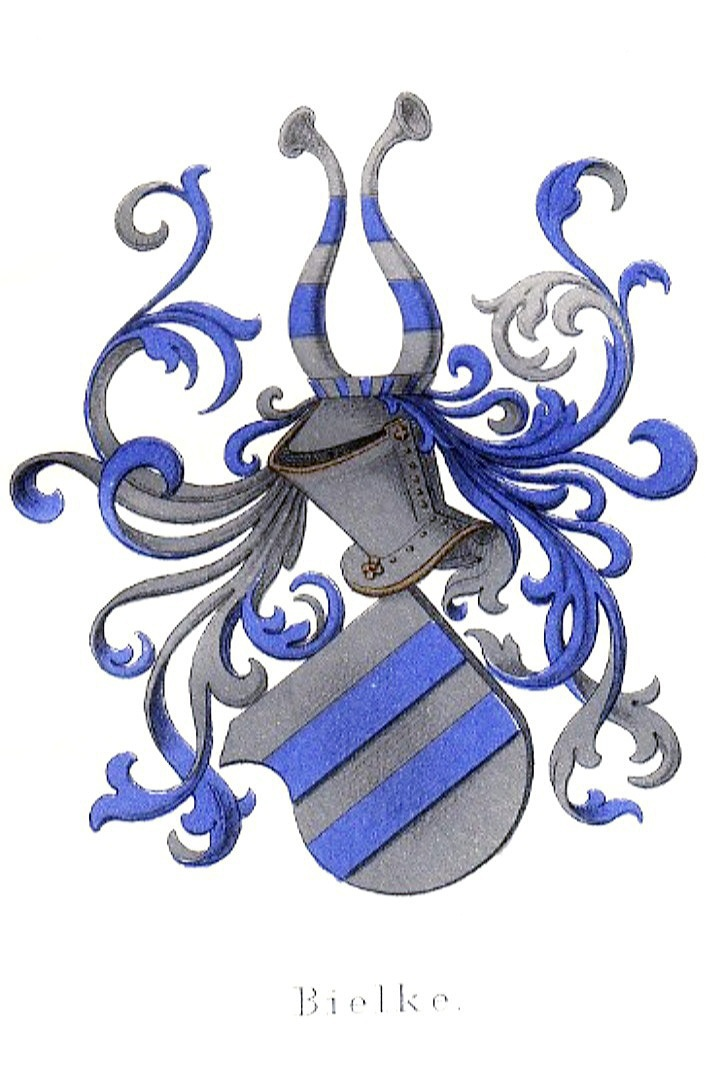
- Coat of arms of the Bjelke family (modern reproduction)

Chancellor of Norway
- In office 1614–1659
- Monarchs: Christian IV; Frederick III
- Preceded by: Anders Lauritsson Green
- Succeeded by: Ove Bjelke

Personal details
- Born: Jens Ågessøn Bjelke; 2 February 1580 Austrått, Norway, Denmark-Norway
- Died: 7 November 1659 (aged 79) Tune, Norway, Denmark-Norway
- Resting place: Onsøy Church
- Spouse(s): Sophie Brockenhuus (m. 1610; died 1656)
- Children: Ove Bjelke (1611–1674); Henrik Bjelke (1615–1683); Jørgen Bjelke (1621–1696); Margrethe Bjelke (1622–1698)
- Parents: Åge Bjelke (father); Margrethe Thott (mother)
- Relatives: Jens Tillufssøn Bjelke (grandfather)
- Education: University of Rostock
- Occupation: Nobleman, feudal lord, jurist and statesman

Jens Ågessøn Bjelke (2 February 1580 – 7 November 1659) was a Norwegian nobleman who was Chancellor of Norway from 1614 to 1659, and was succeeded by his son Ove Bjelke. He was the son of Åge Bjelke and Margrethe Thott. At the time of his death, he was Norway's largest land owner. After his tenure as Chancellor, the office largely lost its influence and was abolished in 1679.

== Education and early career ==
Bjelke was born at Austrått. At 20 years of age, he was sent abroad to study, studying in Rostock, Leipzig, Leiden and elsewhere. He studied medicine, among other things. On his return on 20 February 1605 he was employed at the Danish Chancery and remained there as a secretary until 20 January 1609. During this time he was assigned the prosecution of the case against Jørgen Dybvad in 1607. He also continued his pursuit of literary works and wrote "Regarding Greenland" on the occasion of expeditions to rediscover that country.

When he terminated work at the chancery and was proceeding to Norway, he accompanied Christian Friis to the Danish Council meeting in Horsens, in late January 1609, addressing Sweden's continuing attempts to penetrate into Northern Norway (Nordland and Finnmark). From Horsens, he served as courier to convey the letters directing the men governing these northern Norwegian territories.

== Norway's largest landowner ==
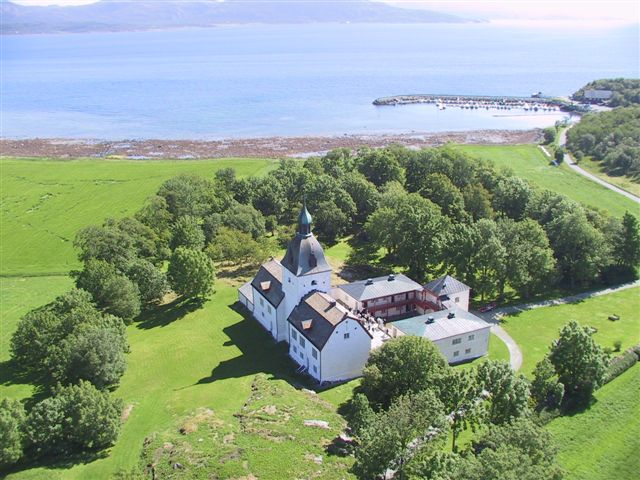
The Renaissance Manor at Austrått (completed around 1656).

Upon his return to Norway, he resided at Austrått, which he had inherited from his father, who died in 1603. Austrått was a setegård or noble-seat farm, which was therefore exempt from taxes and tithe.

In 1610 he married Sophie Brockenhuus (who died 1656). She brought substantial land to the marriage, including Elingård and Sande farms in Smaalenene, Hovinsholm farm in Hedemarken and Kanestrøm farm at Nordmøre, as well as the allodial rights to Evje farm in Smaalenene. With this marriage, he became one of the wealthiest nobles in Norway. Later he bought Storfosna farm (another setegård) and Tøndel farms near Austrått, Holden farm in Nordmøre, Mel and Hatteberg farms (now Rosendal) in Sunnhordland, Skredshol farm in Hedemarken, Toyen farm near Christiania, and Kjølberg, Veden and Herrebrøden farms in Smaalenene. By the time of his death, he was the largest landowner in Norway.

In 1611 he received his first fief, Rein Monastery in Rissa, near Trondheimfjord's northern shores, which fell under the crown following the Reformation.

== Kalmar War ==
In April, 1611 King Christian IV declared war on Sweden. Jens Bjelke and Steen Bille, then Governor of Trondelag, were directed to assemble 2,000 men and muster them in Jämtland. Their movement of Norwegian troops into Sweden from Jämtland was rebuffed and then-Catholic Sweden took control of then-Catholic Jämtland, with a notable welcome from the natives. Jämtland was returned to Norway in the peace treaty and Jens did not suffer seriously for the failed invasion of Sweden as he went on to become Chancellor of Norway. Jens Bjelke held the office of Chancellor from 1614, was feudal overlord to Bergen from 1633, in Stavanger from 1641 and later on Elingård as well.

== Norway's Chancellor ==
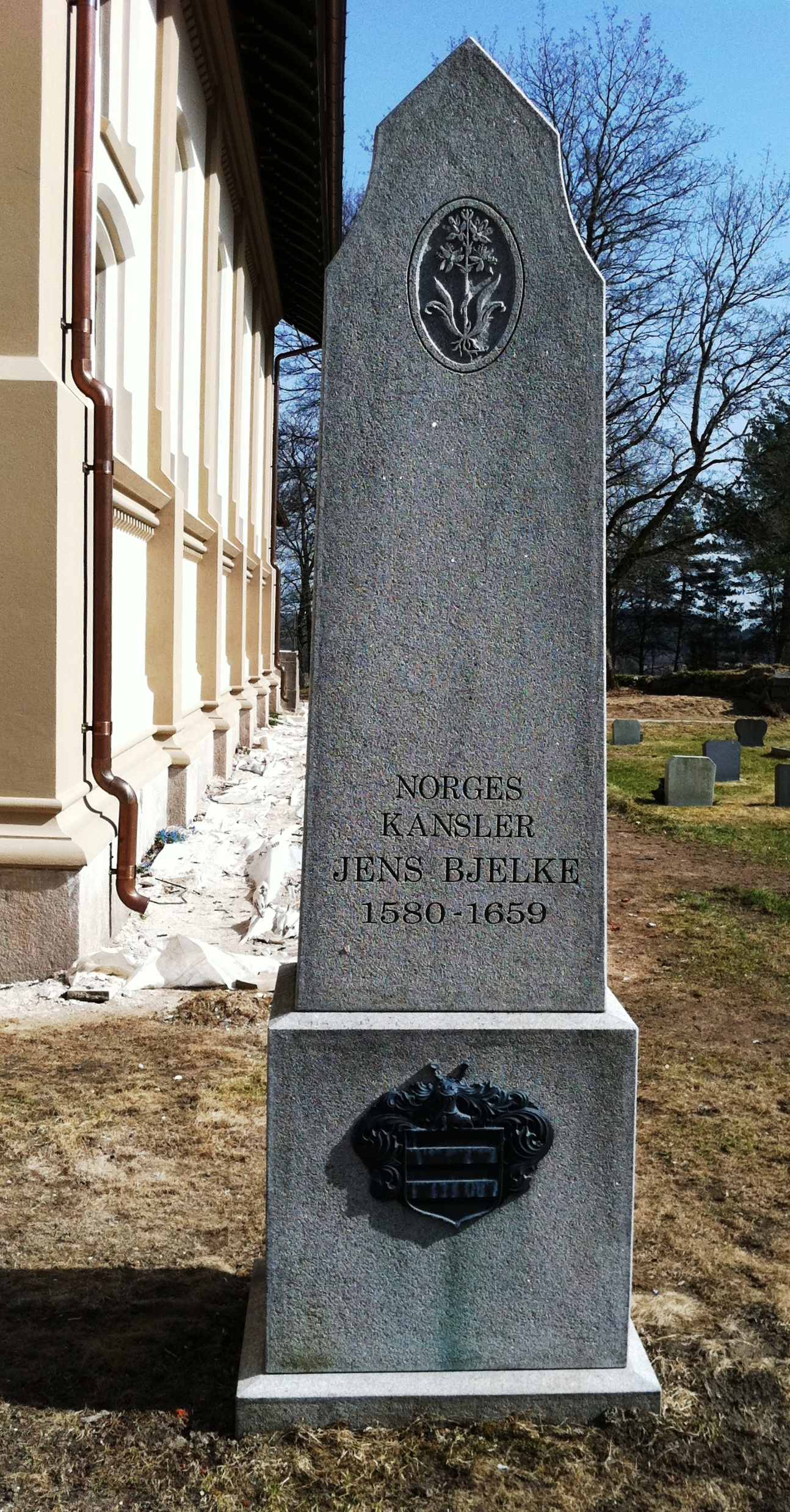
Memorial at Onsøy Church

On December 8, 1614 he became Chancellor of Norway and was awarded lay canon status in Oslo, together with the fief of Onsøy in Smaalenene and the Nonneseter monastic properties. In the position as chancellor he was the senior authority in the national judicial system and was routinely a member of the investigative and judicial commissions. In 1623 and 1624, along with Jeens Juel, he studied the state of forests in Norway and performed the same service again in 1631, working with the Governor-general of Norway Christoffer Urne. From April to August 1632 he traveled throughout Norway to adjudicate matters between common people and sheriffs. Bjelke developed an interpretation of the ancient Norwegian laws, along with a recommendation that the older laws be revised. His interpretation was used until Christian V of Denmark-Norway's Norwegian law revision was developed by a commission and approved in 1687.

In June 1633 he was invested with the fief of Bergen, which he exchanged for the fief of Stavanger on May 1, 1641. In 1643, Denmark-Norway made preparations to intervene for a second time in the Thirty Years' War. During this war, from 1643 to 1645, he served as war commissioner. Chancellor Jens Bjelke collaborated with Governor General Gregers Krabbe on several initiatives, including the construction of municipal granaries, fortifications along the border with Sweden and the fortification of Fredrikstad. He resigned from public service in 1646 and received the Mariekirkens rectory in Stavanger. He died, aged 79, at Sande, Østfold.

== Termini Juridici – The first Norwegian dictionary ==
In 1634 Bjelke published the first Norwegian dictionary (Termini Juridici, english; Legal Terms). The book was intended to serve as an aid for Danish individuals who served in Norway. The Norwegian language had, at that time, begun to be influenced by Danish, but the Norwegian Law Codes was written in Old Norwegian, making them hard to read for Danish speakers.

== Family ==
He had 14 children, of whom 8 lived to maturity and survived him. His three sons Ove Bjelke (1611–1674), Henrik Bjelke (1615–1683) and Jørgen Bjelke (1621–1696) held prominent positions.

Government offices
Preceded by Anders Lauritsson Green	Chancellor of Norway; 1614–1659	Succeeded by Ove Bjelke
