= Jørgen Bjelke =

Norwegian officer and nobleman

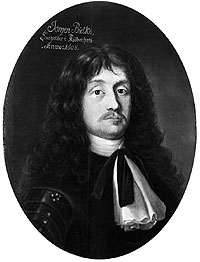
- Born: 1621; Fredrikstad, Norway
- Died: 1696 (aged 74–75) Aunsøgård, Denmark
- Allegiance: Denmark-Norway
- Rank: Lieutenant general
- Commands: Commander-in-chief of the Norwegian army
- Conflicts: Torstenson War; Dano-Swedish War (1657–1658); Dano-Swedish War (1658–1660); Siege of Trondheim

Jørgen Bjelke (2 June 1621 – 17 June 1696) was a Dano-Norwegian or Norwegian officer and nobleman. He was born at Elingaard Manor on Onsøy near Fredrikstad, in Østfold County, Norway, and died in Kalundborg, Denmark.

== Early and personal life ==
He was the son of the Reich Chancellor of Norway, Jens Ågessøn Bjelke, and Sophie Brockenhuus. His brothers were Ove and Henrik Bjelke.

He matriculated at the University of Leyden and later at the University of Orléans.

== Military career ==
He served as a captain in the Hannibal Feud 1644-45. He subsequently saw Danish-Norwegian imperial service in the fighting against the Swedish forces in Germany.

During what is referred to in Norway as "The Bjelke Feud", lieutenant general Bjelke served as the commander-in-chief of the Norwegian army. In August 1658 Charles X of Sweden ignored the recently negotiated Treaty of Roskilde and invaded Copenhagen. The Norwegian army mobilized under the leadership of Jørgen Bjelke. Belke's goal was to recapture Trøndelag in the north and to defend the southern Norwegian border at Halden, an areas which Charles X had demanded be turned over to Sweden as it provided both an excellent port for timber export from the newly acquired Bohuslän and a point from which further invasions of Norway could be launched. He would succeed with this in December. In September 1658 the new Swedish governor of Bohuslän invaded Norway with 1,500 men and attempted to invade Halden. The inhabitants put up a vigorous defense and the Swedes retreated to Bohuslän.

Gjerset indicates that, "Peder Vibe was commandant of Trondhjem, but the expedition against Sweden in this quarter was to be led by Jørgen Bjelke, probably the most able officer in the Norwegian army at that moment. His forces numbered 2000 men, who had been recruited primarily in Trøndelagen. With this force he invaded Jaemtland and Herjedalen, drove out the Swedish garrisons, and returned the two provinces once more under Norwegian administration."

Five months later, in February 1659, the Swedes again attacked. Since the first attack, Bjelke had directed the garrison to be strengthened. Under the leadership of Tønne Huitfeldt, the Norwegians again repulsed the Swedish forces. Concurrently, Huitfeldt began construction of fortifications. Cretzenstein, later to be renamed Fredriksten, was the citadel of the fortification system. After each attack on Frederiksten, Bjelke invaded the former Norwegian province of Bohuslän and twice succeeded in reconquering most of it.

== Rise and downfall ==
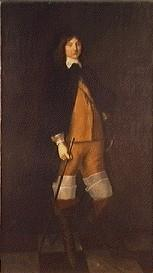
Jørgen Bjelke.

Bielke was one of Peter Griffenfeld's favourites. On 24 May 1658, Bjelke was promoted to general-lieutenant. On 22 November, he was created a privy councillor. 1661 saw him appointed as vice president of Krigskollegiet. In the same year, he was also appointed as a Supreme Court justice.

His holdings included Aakjær, Trudsholm and Birkende in Denmark as well as Hovindsholm and a number of otherestates in Norway. In 1781, he was appointed as county governor of Holbæk, Kalundborg and Sæbygaard. He was later appointed as statholder of Zealand.

When Griffenfeld was arrested, Bjelke kept defending his own friend and benefactor. This resulted in his own fall from grace and. He settled on his estate at Kalundborg but his fall resulted in economic ruin, forcing him to sell most of his estates. He kept the post as county governor until his death.
