= Chancellor of Norway =

- Kansler av Norge
- Residence: St Mary's Church, Oslo
- Appointer: King of Norway
- Formation: 1266
- First holder: Askatin
- Final holder: Johan Frederik von Marschalck
- Abolished: 1679
- Succession: Appointment

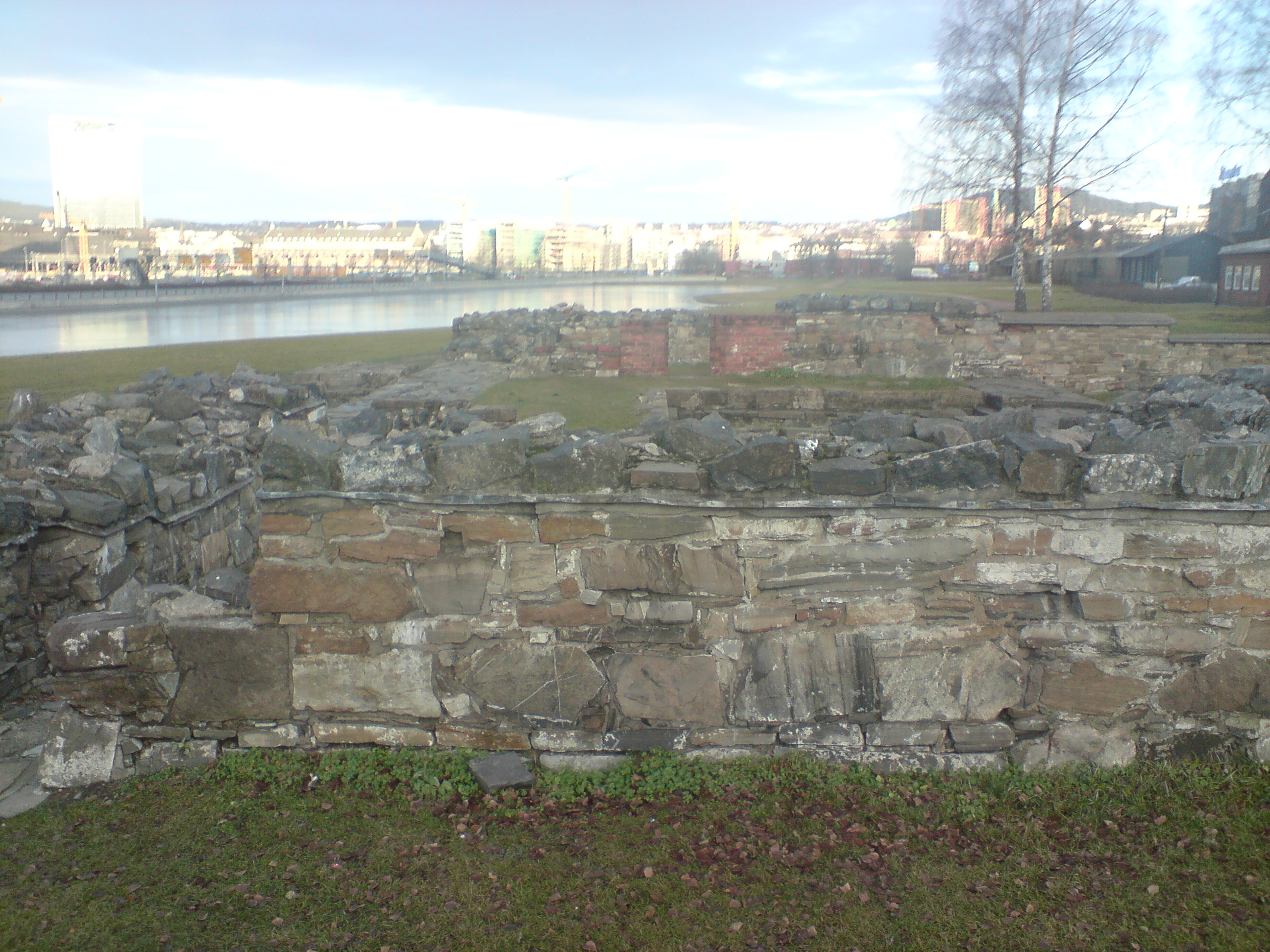
Ruins of St Mary's Church

The Chancellor of Norway (modern Norwegian: Norges rikes kansler, "Chancellor of Norway's Realm") was the most important aide of the King of Norway during the Middle Ages, and during the Union with Denmark. He issued laws and regulations, and was responsible for day-to-day administration of the kingdom. From 1270, the Chancellor resided in Bergen. Haakon V of Norway moved the Chancellor's residence to Oslo; on 31 August 1314 the provost of St Mary's Church became Chancellor on a permanent basis. He was given the Great Seal of the Realm "for eternity." The Chancellors were originally chosen from the clergy but after 1542 the position was given to people from the nobility. The position lost its importance after Jens Bjelke's tenure, and was abolished in 1679.

== Chancellors of Norway ==
=== Kingdom of Norway (872–1397) ===
- Askatin, 1266–??
- Torer Håkonsson, until 1276
- Orm Merkesmann, 1276–1280
- Bjarne Lodinsson, 1280–99?
- Bård Bartholomoeus Serksson, 1299?–1305?
- Åke chancellor, 1299?–1314
- Ivar Olavsson, 1314–19
- Pål Bårdsson, 1327−1333
- Arne Aslaksson, 1344–??
- Peter Eiriksson, 1351?−1370
- Pål Eriksson,
- Henrik Henriksson, 1382−1388
- Henrik Vinaldsson, late 14th century

=== Kalmar Union ===
- Arne Sigurdsson, 1389−1402
- Jakob Knutson, 1407−1420
- Jens Jakobssøn Blik, 1420–1439
- Andres Laurensson Mus, 1439−?
- Sigurd Bjørnsson, 1441
- Gunnar Holk, 1439?–48
- Ivar Vikingsson, 1453–85
- Bo Pederson Fleming 1485–1491
- Erik Walkendorf, 1505-10
- Mattis Hvørf, 1520–21
- Hans Olsson, 1522–23
- Mattis Hvørf, 1524–32

=== Denmark-Norway ===
- Morten Krabbe (Nilsson), 1532–42
- Peder Huitfeldt, 1547–65
- Oluf Kalips (Pedersson), 1565–67
- Johan Venstermand, 1567–72
- Hans Pederssøn Litle (Basse), 23 June 1592 – 1602
- Anders Lauritsson Green (Anders Lauritsson of Sundsby), 24 July 1604 – 1614
- Jens Bjelke, 1614–59
- Ove Bjelke, 8 December 1660–74
- Johan Frederik von Marschalck, 1674–1679
