= 16th century in Norway =

- Other decades
- 14th | 15th | 16th | 17th | 18th

Events from the 16th century in Norway.

== Significant events ==
=== 1501–1509 ===
1501

- August – Alvsson's rebellion starts.
  - Knut Alvsson led Swedish forces in an attack on Båhus Fortress.
- The rebels led by Nils Ravaldsson succeed in occupying Marstrand and Sarpsborg.

1502

- Alvsson's rebellion:
  - March – Knut Alvsson succeeds in occupying Akershus Fortress and Tønsberg Fortress.
  - July–August – Henrich Krummedige recaptures Tønsberg Fortress and lays siege to Akershus Fortress.
  - 18 August – Knut Alvsson and men loyal to him are murdered during a parley with Henrich Krummedige.
- Olsborg Castle is constructed by Nils Ravaldsson.
- The Krummedige-Tre Rosor feud ends.

1503

- Alvsson's rebellion
  - The Tønsberg Fortress was destroyed by rebels.
  - Rebels under the leadership of Nils Ravaldsson succeed in occupying Konghelle.
  - Nils Ravaldssons forces lay siege to Bohus Fortress.

1504

- Alvsson's rebellion:
  - May – A one-year ceasefire was signed between the Norwegian rebels and King Hans, but was broken by the king in December.
  - 24 December – Alvsson's rebellion was crushed at Olsborg Castle in Båhuslen.

1505

- 20 July – Nils Sveinsson was ennobled, and given the noble family name Tordenstjerne.

1506

- Prince Christian was appointed Viceroy of Norway.

1507

- Herlaug Hovudfat's rebellion starts, a large rebellion in Hedmarken.

1508

- Herlaug Hovudfat's rebellion ends.

=== 1510s ===
1513

- 22 July – King Christian II is elected King of Norway.

1514

- 23 July – King Christian II is crowned King of Norway in Oslo. This coronation was the last in Norway for 304 years when King Charles III John was crowned king in 1818.

1519

- The Orm Eriksson Tax Revolt, a large tax revolt in Rogaland.

=== 1520s ===
1521

- January – The Swedish War of Liberation starts.
- Orm Eriksson was executed by hanging for his involvement in the tax revolt of 1519.

1523

- 20 January – Christian II is deposed as King of Norway.
- 31 January – Swedish forces occupy Ranrike.
- 1 July – Olav Torkelsson becomes Bishop of Bergen.
- November
  - 8–9 November – Hansa merchants expels all Scots from Bergen.
  - Swedish War of Liberation ends. This marks the end for the Kalmar Union.
  - Supporters of Christian II surrendered Akershus Fortress and Bergenhus Fortress to the Norwegian National Council.
- December – Olav Engelbrektsson becomes the Archbishop of Norway.
- Swedish forces besiges Akershus Fortress.

1524

- 5 August – King Frederick I of Denmark is elected King of Norway.
- 1 September – Treaty of Malmö.
- Rebellion against King Frederick I in Agder starts.

1525

- Rebellion against King Frederick I in Agder ends.

1527

- The Dalejunkeren affair, a diplomatic scandal involving Sweden and Norway. Norwegian nobels proctected a Swedish rebel known as Dalejunkeren.

=== 1530s ===
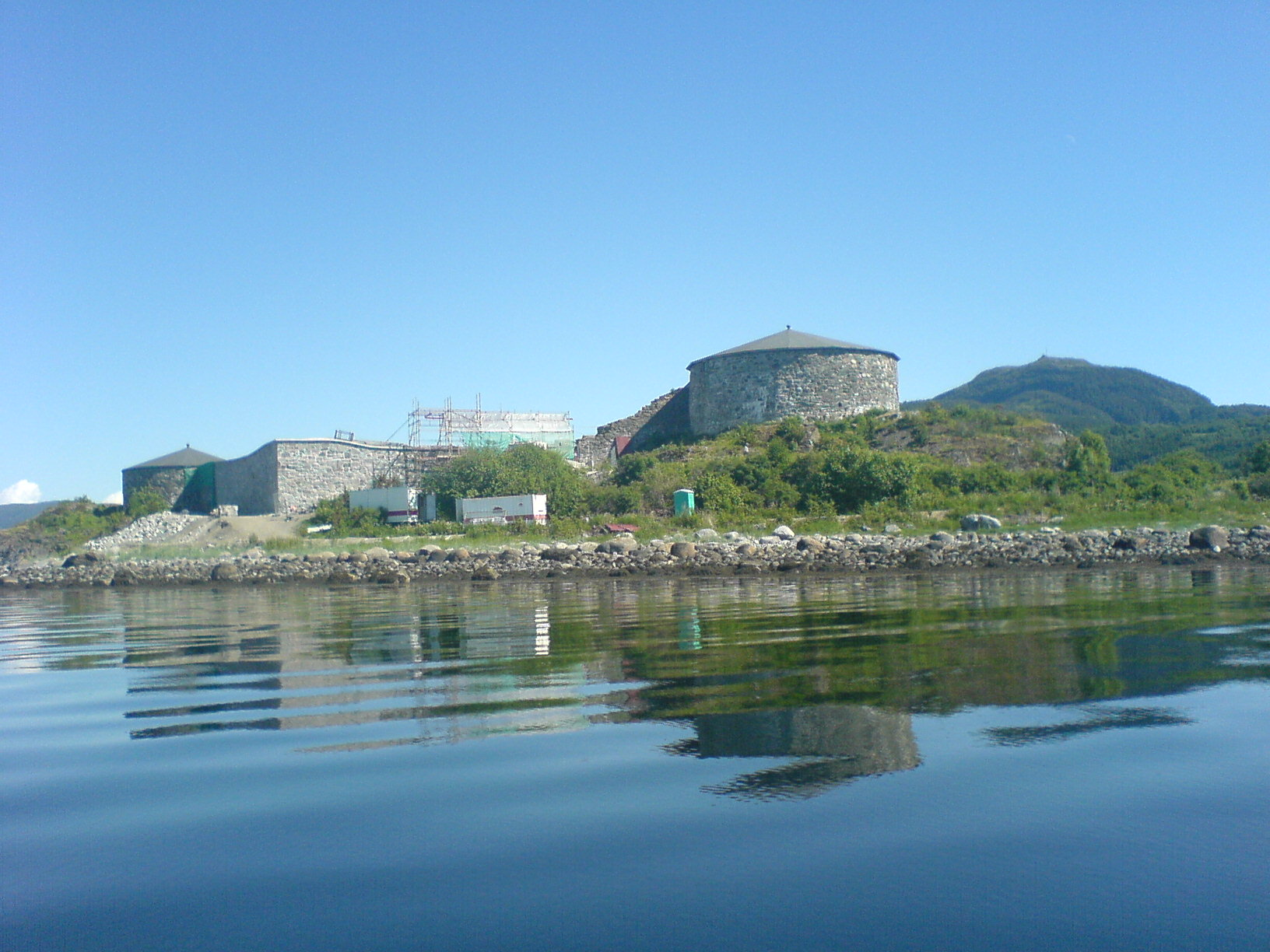
Nils Lykke was imprisoned and executed at Steinvikholm Castle.

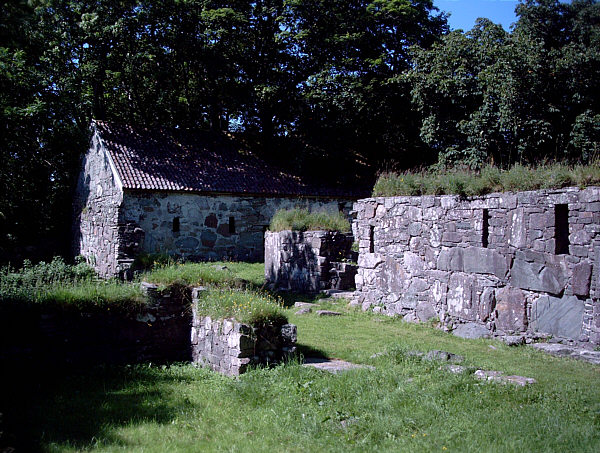
Halsnøy Abbey ruins

1531

- Christ Church in Bergen was demolished.
- November – King Christian II invades Norway, but the invasion fail, and he is taken prisoner and brought to Denmark.

1532

- 1 July – King Christian II is arrested and brought to Denmark. He was kept prisoner for the next 27 years, until his death.
- Ranrike is returned to Norway from Sweden.

1533

- 10 April – King Frederick I dies, and Norway enters a interregnum period, lasting until 1537.

1535

- Spring – The southern branch of the Norwegian riksråd elects Christian III of Denmark as king of Norway. The northern branch refuse to accept the election. The privy councils leader Olav Engelbrektsson wants Frederick the Wise as king.
- 21 July – Nils Lykke is convicted for incest and is executed later the same year.

1536

- The Reformation in Norway starts.
- 3 January – Realm council Vincens Lunge is murdered in Nidaros, and other people loyal to Christian III of Denmark is arrested. This event marks the beginning of the Reformation in Norway and Olav Engelbrektssons rebellion.
- 7 January – Archbishop Olav Engelbrektsson sent squads of supporters to villages in Eastern Norway; the squads proclaimed to the people that a new ruler (Frederick the Wise) could be on his way.
- January–April – Many farmers and bourgeoisie in Eastern Norway rises up in rebellion for the Archbishop, but it soon failed as no actual support from Frederick came.
- March – The Archbishops forces led by Kristoffer Throndsen, fails to capture Bergenhus Fortress, and Throndsen is arrested during a parley with the commanders of the fort.
- April – Olav Engelbrektsson releases supporters of Christian III from prison at Tautra.
- Fall – The Protestant forces led by Peder Hanssøn Litle, takes control over Akershus Fortress.
- Munkeliv Abbey was destroyed by fire and was never rebuilt.
- The town of Tønsberg was destroyed by fire.
- Halsnøy Abbey was dissolved.
- Lyse Abbey was dissolved.

1537

- The Reformation in Norway:
  - January–February – The Commander of Bergenhus Fortress Eske Billes forces sacks farms of supporters of Archbishop Olav Engelbrektsson in Møre og Romsdal.
  - 1 April – The Archbishop of Norway Olav Engelbrektsson flees from Trondheim to Lier, Belgium.
  - April – Christian III sends a fleet with soldiers to Norway.
  - April – Steinvikholm Castle is besieged by the Protestant forces.
  - 17 May – The Archbishops men surrenders Steinvikholm Castle to the Protestant forces.
  - May – The forces sent by Christian III arrives in Norway. The army splits in two. One part plunders setesveins of Olav Engelbrektsson, the other part heads to Hamar to arrest Bishop Mogens Lauritssøn.
  - 20 June – Siege of Hamar starts.
  - 23 June – Siege of Hamar ends with the arrest of Bishop Mogens Lauritssøn, and the Catholic rebellion is definitively ended in Norway.
  - 2 September – Gjeble Pederssøn becomes the first Lutheran bishop in Norway.
- Dissolution of all the monasteries in Norway, including:
  - Bakke Abbey
  - Munkeby Abbey
  - Tautra Abbey
  - Nidarholm Abbey
  - Gimsøy Abbey
  - Utstein Abbey
- St. Olav's shrine was destroyed.
- King Christian III of Denmark becomes King of Norway, and the real union of Denmark–Norway is formed.
- The Norwegian Riksråd was dissolved.

1538

- Christian III starts a mining project in Telemark.

1539

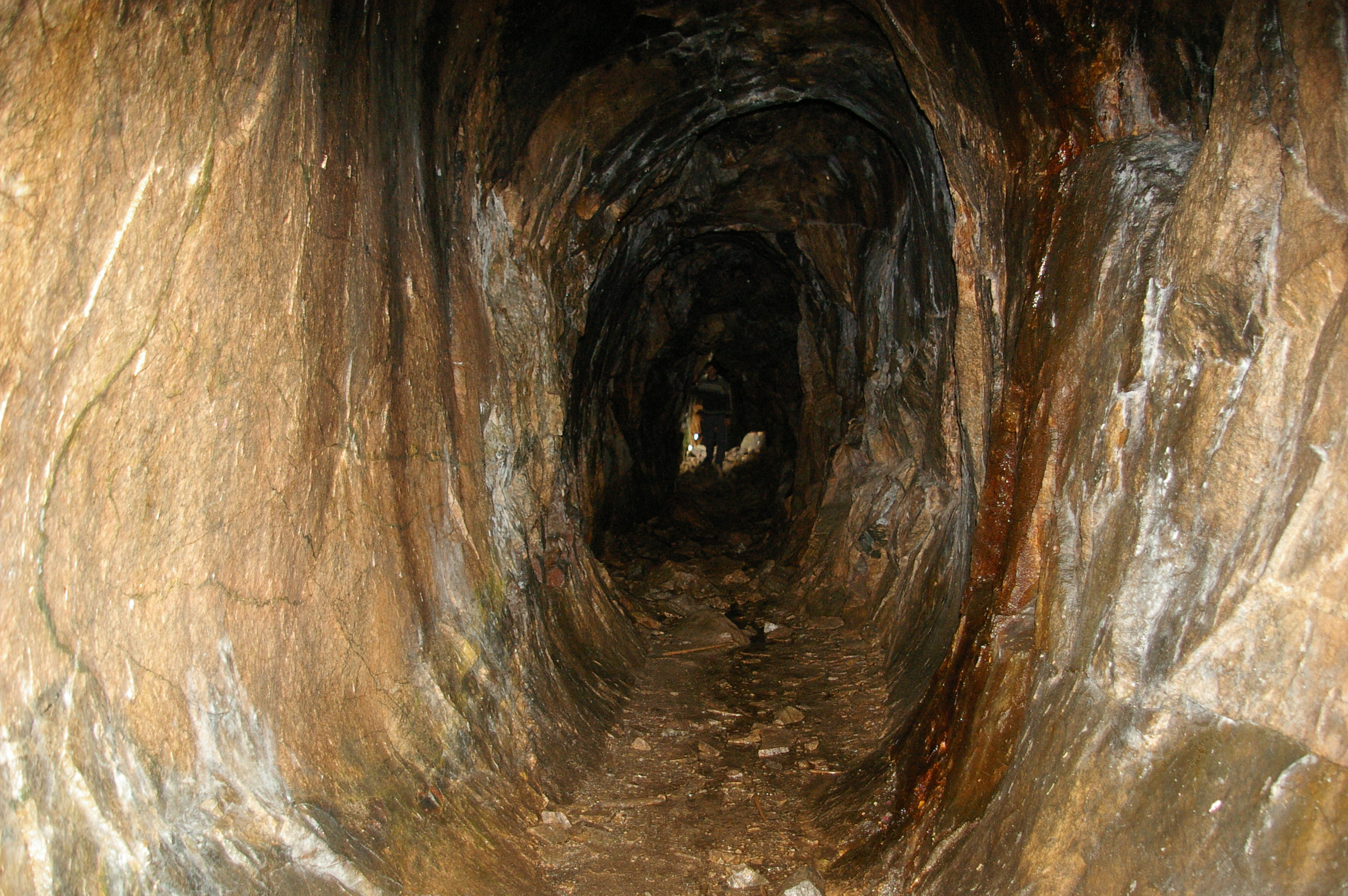
The Glaser Mine in Skien is named after Hans Glaser.

- May – Hans Glaser became bergmeister in Telemark.
- Summer – Norway's first Lutheran Church Ordinance is introduced.
- Kristoffer Throndsen raids Utstein Abbey and the Bishop's Palace in Stavanger.
- Herredag, the highest court in Norway, was established.

=== 1540s ===
1540

- The Peasant's Rebellion in Telemark.
- The Peasant's Rebellion in Agder starts.

1541

- The Peasant's Rebellion in Agder ends.

1542

- The Tamperret, a special marriage court, is established.

1544

- 23 May – The Treaty of Speyer, emperor Charles V of The Holy Roman Empire recognized Christian III as the rightful king of Denmark and Norway.

1545

- The cathedral chapter at St Mary's Church was dissolved.

1446

- A fire burns Gimsøy Abbey to the ground.

1547

- Peder Huitfeldt becomes Chancellor of Norway.

1548

- Summer – Prince Frederick II of Norway was proclaimed as heir apparent to Christian III of Norway, in Oslo.
- The Plague of 1547–1548 ends. It was a bubonic plague, that spread to large parts of South Norway.

=== 1550s ===
1553

- 22 July – Christen Munk and other notable men met at Hamarhus in Hamar. They were there to record the most important of the town's buildings, streets, organization and population. The result of there work was the Hamar Chronicle.

1555

- Inger Ottesdotter Rømer and her daughter Lucie Nilsdatter dies in a shipwrecking off the coast of Sunnmøre.
- Anti-Catholicism in Norway: Two farmers were burned to death at the stake in Vestfold. The two men had preached Catholic teachings.

1556

- Christen Munk was appointed Governor-General of Norway.

1557

- 22 January – Jon Guttormssøn resign as Bishop of Stavanger.

1558

- 22 January – The Livonian War starts.

1559

- 1 January – Frederick II of Denmark-Norway becomes king after the death of his father, Christian III. The first hereditary monarch of Norway since the abolition of the elective monarchy by Christian III.

=== 1560s ===
1562

- The first recorded theatrical performance in Norway. It was the play Adams fall (The Fall of Adam), staged outdoors in Bergen by Absalon Pederssøn Beyer and performed by his Latin school students.

1563

- 13 August – The Northern Seven Years' War starts.

1564

- Northern Seven Years War

- February – Swedish troops occupy Jemtland, Herjedalen and Trøndelag. Trøndelag is retaken the same year, but Jemtland and Herjedalen is given back in 1570.
- Helgeseter Priory is burned down by Swedish forces.
- 22 May – Norwegian forces under the command of Erik Rosenkrantz retakes Steinvikholm Castle from Swedish troops.

1565

- March – Swedish troops besieges Steinvikholm Castle, but fails in taking the castle.
- Oluf Kalips becomes Chancellor of Norway.

1567

- The Northern Seven Years' War: May – Swedish invasion of Norway.
  - Swedish forces torched Konghelle and Sarpsborg.
  - Swedish forces torches Hamar, destroying Hamar Cathedral and the bishop's fortified palace Hamarhus.
- 12 September – The city of Fredrikstad was established through a King's decree.
- Johan Venstermand becomes Chancellor of Norway.

=== 1570s ===
1570

- Værne Kloster is burned down in connection with the Northern Seven Years' War.
- 13 December – The Treaty of Stettin ends the Northern Seven Years' War.

1571

- 29 July – Battle of Hel, Denmark–Norway defeats Poland–Lithuania in a naval battle.

1572

- Povel Huitfeldt was appointed Governor-General of Norway.
- Johan Venstermand is deposed as Chancellor of Norway, and the position was vacant until 1592.

1573

- Anti-Catholicism in Norway: Ingeborg Kjeldsdatter from Skiptvet was flogged. Her crime was that she had practiced Catholic Marian devotion.

1575

- 12 December – The Danzig rebellion began. The city of Danzig rebels against Poland–Lithuania, Denmark–Norway joins the side of the rebels.

1576

- The first mention of Porsgrunn by the writer Peder Claussøn Friis in his work Concerning the Kingdom of Norway

1577

- 9 July – Ludvig Munk was appointed Governor-General of Norway.
- December – End of the Danzig rebellion.

1579

- Christen Mule erects a Renaissance building on the ruins of the previous bishop's palace in Oslo.

=== 1580s ===
1580

- The 1580 influenza pandemic.
- The first mention of the trading port of Flekkefjord.

1582

- The Noble Privileges of 1582; decreed that a noblewoman who married a non-noble man should lose all her hereditary land to her nearest co-inheritor, for example her brother.

1583

- Ludvig Munk is deposed as Governor-General of Norway, and the position was vacant until 1588.

1585

- Hamre Church was built.

1587

- Hamar lost its townstatus, when merchants in Oslo got King Frederick II to move all of Hamar's market activities to Oslo (the town regained its status in 1849).

1588

- 4 April – Christian IV of Denmark-Norway becomes king after the death of his father, Frederick II.
- August – Axel Gyldenstierne was appointed Governor-General of Norway.
- 21 September – Santiago, a Spanish Armada supply ship, got wrecked near Mosterhamn in Hardanger Fjord.

1589

- 28 October – James VI of Scotland arrives in Flekkefjord by ship.
- 23 November – James VI married Anne of Denmark at the Bishop's Palace in Oslo.
- 22 December – James VI and Anne of Denmark leaves Oslo by sled to Copenhagen.

=== 1590–1600 ===
1590

- 7 April – Anne Pedersdotter was burned alive at the stake in the city of Bergen. Her case is regarded as the starting point of the witch trials in Norway.

1591

- 8 June – King Christian IV was hailed as King of Norway in Oslo.
- 31 July – The Sorenskriver office is introduced in Norway.
- The district court system is established.
- The oldest document with the seal of Stavanger city coat of arms is made.

1592

- 23 June – Hans Pederssøn Litle becomes Chancellor of Norway.

1595

- The first pharmacy in Norway opened (Svaneapoteket in Bergen).

1599

- April - July – King Christian IV led a secret naval expedition along the Norwegian coast to Vardø to secure the northern borders against Sweden and foreign expansion, ensuring Finnmark remained Norwegian territory.

1600

- Cort Aslakssøn becomes the first Norwegian professor at the University of Copenhagen.

== Births ==
- 1501 – 18 July – Isabella of Burgundy, queen of Christian II of Denmark (d. 1526)

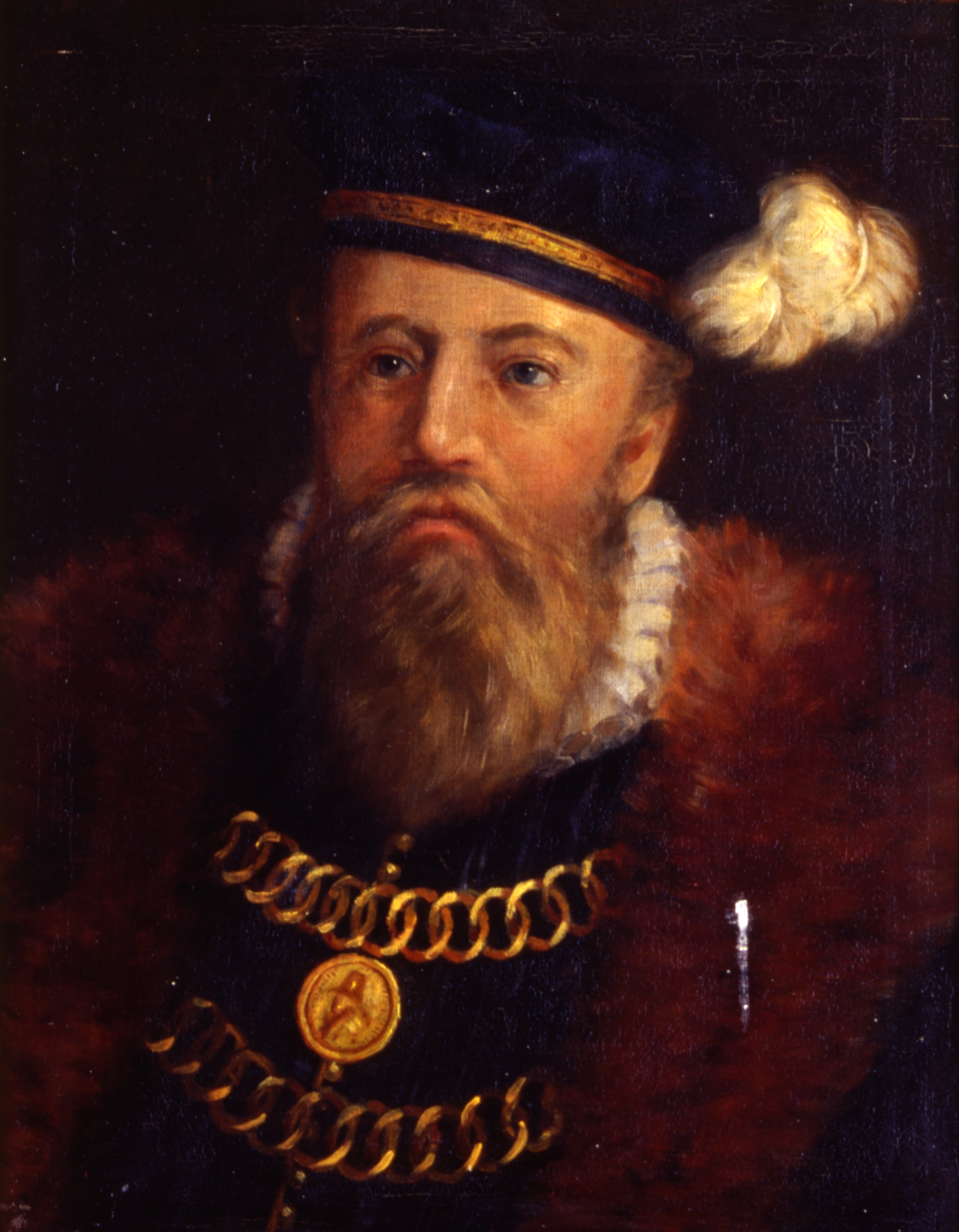
Jakob Bagge

- 1502

- 1 May – Jakob Bagge, Norwegian-born Swedish admiral (died 1577).
- Torbjørn Bratt, clergyman (died 1548).

- 1503 – 12 August – Christian III of Denmark and Norway (d. 1559)
- 1505 – Jens Olavssøn Bratt, clergyman (d. 1548)
- 1514 – Heine Havreki, priest (d.1576)
- 1537 – Ludvig Munk, Stadtholder of Norway (d. 1602)
- 1538

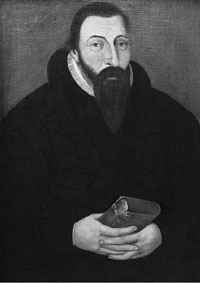
Jens Nilssøn

- Jens Nilssøn, bishop (died 1600).
- Enno Brandrøk, nobleman, mercenary and adventurer (died 1571).
- Laurentius Nicolai, Jesuit, active in service of the Counter-Reformation (died 1622).

- 1539 – 7 April – Strange Jørgenssøn, bailiff and businessman (died 1610).
- 1545 – 1 April – Peder Claussøn Friis, author (died 1614)
- 1561 – Christoffer Hjort, priest, expelled from the country for Catholicism in 1613 (died 1616).
- 1564 – 28 June – Cort Aslakssøn astronomer, theologist and philosopher (died 1624).
- 1579 – 3 June – Jens Munk, polar explorer (died 1628).
- 1580

- 8 January – Jens Hermansson Juel, nobleman, Governor-general of Norway (died 1634).
- 2 February – Jens Bjelke, nobleman, Chancellor of Norway (died 1659).

- 1590

- Peter Paulson Paus, provost (died 1653)
- Probable – Magdalena Andersdotter, shipowner (died c.a 1650)

- 1592 – Axel Mowat, admiral and land owner (died 1661).

== Deaths ==
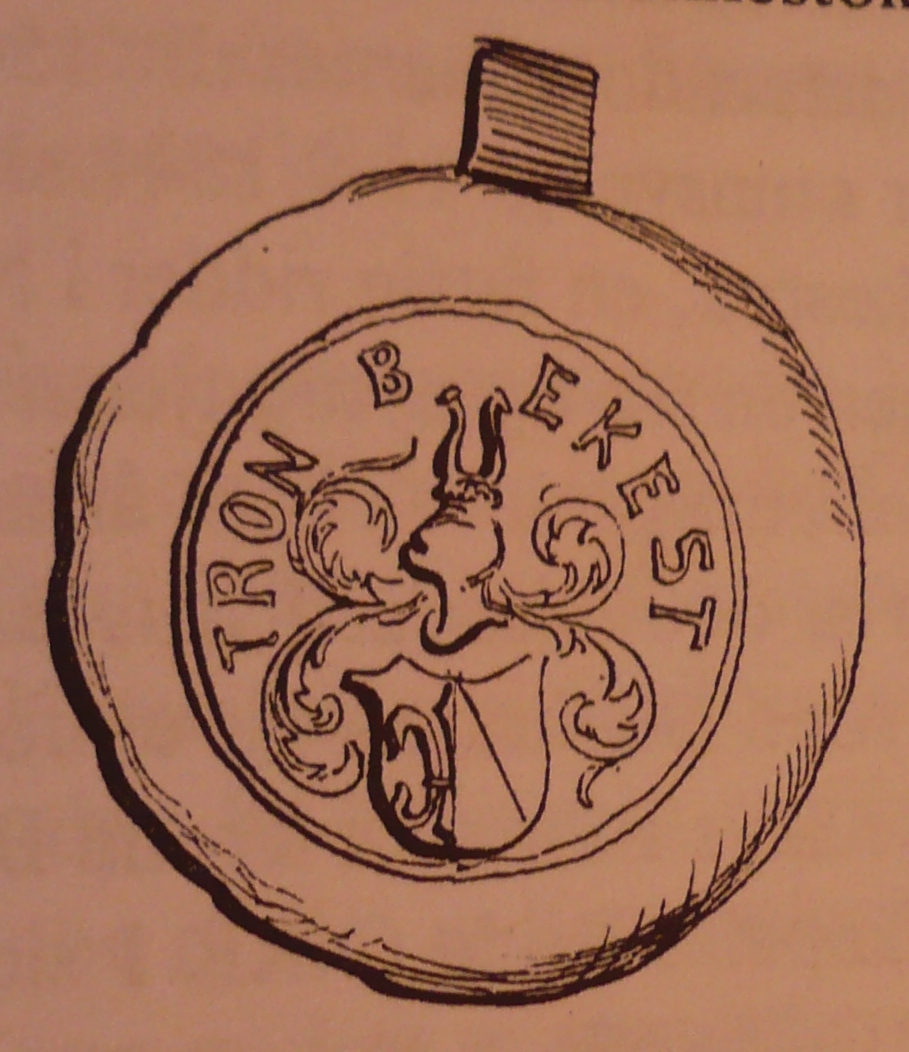
Seal of Trond Torleivsson Benkestok

- 1502 – 18 August – Knut Alvsson, nobleman and landowner (born c. 1455).
- 1505 – Nils Ravaldsson, leader of Alvsson's rebellion
- 1521 – Orm Eriksson, nobleman (born c. 1476).
- 1523 – Nils Henriksson, knight, landowner, National Counselor, Lord High Steward of Norway (born c. 1455)
- 1535

- 30 May – Olav Torkelsson, Roman Catholic bishop.
- 24 December – Nils Lykke, nobleman.
- Anders Mus, bishop.

- 1536 – 3 January – Vincens Lunge, Realm counselor.
- Probable 1537 – Hoskuld Hoskuldsson, Bishop of Stavanger (b. c. 1465/1470)
- 1538 – 7 February – Olav Engelbrektsson, Archbishop of Norway (born c. 1480).
- 1545

- Hans Glaser, bergmeister (b. c. 1480)
- Hans Rev, bishop (b. c. 1489)

- 1548

- 12 June – Jens Olavssøn Bratt, clergyman (born c. 1505).
- Torbjørn Bratt, clergyman and bishop (born c. 1502).

- 1555 – Inger Ottesdotter Rømer, wealthy landowner, Lady of Austraat (born c. 1475).
- 1557 – 9 March – Gjeble Pederssøn, bishop (born c. 1490).
- 1558 – 14 February – Trond Torleivsson Benkestok, nobleman, estate owner and overlord (born c. 1495).
- 1570 – 18 September – Hans Olufsson, high-ranking cleric and nobleman (b.c 1495–1500)
- 1575

- 9 April – Absalon Pederssøn Beyer, clergyman, writer, historian (born c. 1528).
- 29 July – Jon Simonssøn, city manager, lawspeaker, humanist (born 1512).

- 1576 – Heine Havreki, priest (born 1514)
- 1577 – 20 September – Jon Guttormssøn, Lutheran superintendent.
- 1578 – 17 September – Hans Gaas, clergyman (born c. 1500).
- 1581 – Mogens Svale, military commander and landowner (born c.1530).
- 1588

- 4 April – Frederick II, king of Denmark and Norway (born 1534)
- Axel Gyntersberg, nobleman and overlord (born c. 1525).

- 1589 – Christen Mule, merchant and Mayor of Oslo (born c.1525).
- 1590

- 7 April – Anne Pedersdotter, alleged witch (born c. 1530)
- Gude Axelsen Giedde, military officer and priest (born 1510)

- 1591 – 2 November – Frants Berg, bishop (born 1504 ?).
- 1592 – Oluf Kalips, nobleman, landowner and Chancellor of Norway.
- Probable 1593 – Jon Trondson Benkestok, nobleman (born c.1530)
- 1595 – 30 November – Hans Mogenssøn, bishop (born c.1525)
- 1600 – Jens Nilssøn, Bishop of the Diocese of Oslo (born 1538).
