= Olav Torkelsson =

Roman Catholic bishop

Most Reverend Olav Torkelsson
- Bishop of Bjørgvin
- Church: Roman Catholic
- Diocese: Diocese of Bjørgvin
- Appointed: 6 July 1523
- Term ended: 23 May 1535
- Predecessor: Andor Ketilsson
- Successor: diocese abolished

Personal details
- Died: 30 May 1535 Voss, Bergenhus len (now Vestland, Norway)

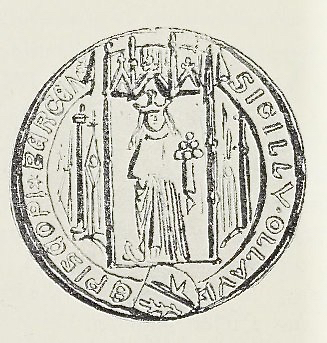
Seal of Olav Torkelsson.

Olav Torkelsson, also known as Olaf Thorkelsön (died 23 May 1535, Voss, Bergenhus len (now Vestland), Norway), was the 31st and final Roman Catholic Bishop of Bergen, from 1523 to 1535, and a member of the Riksråd (National Council of Norway).

== Background ==
Olav Torkelsson belonged to a noble family that owned properties on the islands of Finnøy in Rogaland. He was mentioned for the first time in 1511, when he was a priest in Voss in Hordaland and a canon in Bergen, both in Bergenhus len. By 1519, he had gone to Bergen to be an archdeacon. He was still there three years later, in 1522, when the Bishop of Bergen, Andor Kentilsson, died.

The Cathedral Chapter of Bergen asked the King of Denmark and Norway, Christian II, about his preferences for the successor. He replied that he would like to see the Dean of the Chapter, Hans Knudsson, chosen but he allowed the Cathedral Chapter to have the election itself. On 15 April 1523, the canons chose Olav Torkelsson as their next Bishop and he was appointed nine weeks later, on 1 July, by Pope Adrian VI. Archbishop of Nidaros, Olav Engelbrektsson, then consecrated Torkelsson as the Bishop of Bergen and the new Bishop automatically became a member of the Riksråd.

== The Bishop of Bergen ==
In the meantime, Christian II had fled from the two kingdoms. In the autumn of 1523, Olaf Torkelsson and the rikshovmester (Lord High Steward) of Norway, Nils Henriksson of Austrått (Note: Nils's wife and widow, Inger Ottesdotter Rømer, was the inspiration of Henrik Ibsen's 1857 play, Lady Inger of Ostrat.) (who died soon afterwards), answered the summons of the Bishop of Stavanger, Hoskuld Hoskuldsson, to attend the meeting in Bergen to deliver the support at the Bergenhus Fortress to Christian's uncle, Frederick, the new King of Denmark. For their efforts, he appointed Torkelsson, Hoskuldsson and Vincens Lunge (the son-in-law of Nils Henriksson) to be advisers to the stattholders, as well as the Archbishop of Nidaros Olav Engelbrektsson, for Norway north of Lindesnes. On 5 August 1524, at the meeting of the Riksråd of Norway in Bergen, all the councilors, including Torkelsson, swore their allegiance to King Frederick, two days before his coronation in Copenhagen.

To reward the Bishop, the new King added to the Diocese of Bergen the lands of Hardanger, Nordfjord, and Troms but, in 1528, the Diocese lost Troms and the parish of Gloppen.

== The Turnstile of Troubles ==
One of Olav's first acts as the Bishop was to strengthen the finances of his Cathedral Chapter. To do that, he bought the deanery, which paid the annual pension of the Dean, but it was a royal prelature. So he got into a lengthy dispute with the King and it lasted until 1528, when the Deanery was returned to the King.

Torkelsson's support of Frederick I did not keep him out of trouble. The outgoing Governor of the Bergenhus len, Jørgen Hansson, before he followed Christian II to exile in the Netherlands, counted the Bishop as one of the supporters of his King and called him "true and good" [ tru og god ]. But that did not keep the Bishop from being kidnapped in 1525 by Christian II's men in Sandviken, Norway. He was released only after paying a ransom and promising his fidelity to their King. That did not please the new Governor of the Bergenhus len, Vincens Lunge, who was also the rikshovmester [ Lord High Steward ] of Norway. He believed that the Bishop's loyalty was being questioned so he persuaded Olav to promise his allegiance to Frederick once more. Olav was so depressed by this whole experience that he was ready to resign and retire to a monastery. But he remained in Bergen.

The relationship between Torkelsson and Lunge went from good to bad after 1526, when Lunge allowed the Lutherans to stay in Bergen. They made it difficult for Olav to assert his authority over the whole city as its Bishop. The local clergy and monks were not any better. Some of them were supporting the teachings of Martin Luther and a few more were even making plans to marry. Lunge's personal chaplain, Soren Clemmentson, and the latter's own assistants went to every tavern in Bergen with the announcement that the parishioners did not have to donate any more money to the cost of candles for the Mass in the Cathedral. The news pleased many of the people, especially the merchants from the Hanseatic League, who were not pleased with the Bishop's obsession with the finances. They called him "Bishop Butter-barrel". Once in a while, they would march around his residence as they drummed on empty butter barrels and sang pasquinades. In 1527, Olav complained to a fellow bishop about the dissolute lives of the Dominican friars, who had been spending their evenings everywhere but at their monastery. Then his relationship with Lunge went from bad to worse when Lunge demanded that the Bishop put his journeymen at the disposal of the King. By then, the fight was out of the Bishop. He began to spend more and more time at his Ask estate near Askøy in Hordaland.

King Frederick made the conditions in Bergen even more difficult for Bishop Olav. In 1528, the King secularized the Nonneseter Monastery in Bergen and gave it to Lunge to be used as a private (and fortified ) residence. The King also gave letters of protection to two Lutheran preachers for them to start preaching in Bergen in 1529, inflaming the atmosphere so much that one of them almost had his house blown to the heavens. Bishop Torkelsson then told Archbishop Olav Engelbrektsson that he had had to leave the town to avoid the harassment from Lunge and de sect lutheriana. At that time, Bergen was the home of about 6,000 but 3,000 of them were German. They were allowed to have their own church but the Lutherans took over three of the city's 26 churches for their own services.

Then it was Eske Bille's turn. Having just succeeded Lunge as the Governor of the Bergenhus len and the rikshovmester, he wanted to expand and strengthen the defenses of his headquarters, the Bergenhus Fortress, but the Cathedral of Christ Church, the Royal Chapel of the Apostles, the Bishop's Palace, the Dominican convent and other ecclesiastical buildings were all sitting too close to the walls of the castle. He was the brother of a Catholic bishop (Note: The brother was Ove Pedersson Bille, the Bishop of Aarhus in Denmark. When the Reformation came to Denmark, he was sent to prison for refusing to abandon the Catholic Church but, because of his loyalty to the King and of his family's connections, he was allowed to retire to a monastery for the rest of his life. He died in 1555.) and himself a faithful Catholic but he still demanded that these buildings should be demolished at once. The Bishop and the Cathedral Chapter both agreed in 1531 in exchange for the wealthy Munkeliv Abbey as their compensation.

In November of the same year, Christian II returned and reconquered Norway. He went to the Riksråd [ National Council ] and asked for its support but three of the most important of its members, Olav Torkelsson, Eske Bille and Vincens Lunge, all refused to betray Frederick I. Eventually, in July 1532, Christian II was captured and imprisoned, ending the War of the Two Kings. The show of unity upset Archbishop Engelbrektsson, who had been feuding with Lunge since 1529. He felt that Bishop Torkelsson was aiding and abetting the enemy but the Bishop assured him in 1533 that he was willing to be friends with him again.

== Decline and Death ==
Since he became the Bishop of Bergen, Olav Torkelsson had been a member of the Riksråd. But, after the great events of 1523 and 1524, he attended very few meetings. In 1531, he did not even go to any of the meetings at all besides the united Herredag [ Assembly of the Nobles ] in Copenhagen. When he missed the national assembly in Bud in 1533, he pleaded poor security and poor health. He was indeed very ill at that time. After a long illness, he died on 25 May 1535 at his estate, the Dukstad manor near Voss.

Olav's death spared him from the fate that befell his fellow bishops two years later, when the Reformation came to Norway from Denmark. Archbishop Engelbrektsson had to flee to exile and safety but two of the three other bishops of Norway were captured and imprisoned. The Bishop of Stavanger, Hoskuld Hoskuldsson, already elderly and sickly, was left alone as long as his ally, Eske Bille, was the rikshovmester but, as soon as Bille was transferred, the Bishop was taken to prison, where he quickly died. The Bishop of Hamar, Mogens Lauritssøn, died in captivity in 1542. The third bishop, Hans Rev of Oslo, went over to the Lutheran side and stayed in office for eight more years before he died. He was joined by Olav Thorkelsson's archdeacon, Gjeble Pederssøn, who became the first Lutheran Bishop of Bergen.

Olav Torkelsson, the last Catholic Bishop of Bergen, was summarized by one of his biographers as "a committed Catholic, a man of peace and a good administrator" [ en overbevist katolikk, fredselskende og en flink administrator. ] with a "well-developed financial acumen, and he collected lands with great style. As an administrator, he was talented but rough, and he tried to change the terms of land rent to the advantage of the bishop's chair" [ en velutviklet økonomisk sans, og han samlet jordegods i stor stil. Som administrator var han dyktig, men hardhendt, og han prøvde å endre vilkårene for jordleie til bispestolens fordel ]. But he still owed large sums of money to the German merchants of Bergen when he died. He was not thought to be an educated man but he was interested in history, especially when the subject was Norway.

== Sources ==
This article is adapted from the English translation of the Norwegian biography of "Olav Torkellsson" from the Norsk biographisk lekikson website. For this biography, the author, Terje Bratberg, listed the following sources:

- (in Latin and Norwegian) Diplomatarium Norvegicum [ "Diplomas of Norway" ], Volume I No. 512; Volume IV No. 456; Volume V No. 349; Volume VI Nos. 328, 358 and 726 ff.; Volume VII No. 155; Volume VIII Nos. 531 and 545
- (in Norwegian) Edv[ard]. O[msen]. Heiberg and [ Peter ] Siegw[art Blumenthal]. Petersen, editors, Norske Rigs-Registranter, tildeels i uddrag, Forste Bind, 1523–1571 (Christiania (now Oslo) : Christian C[hristoph]. A[ndreas]. Lange, 1861), pages 25 ff.
- (in Norwegian) Absalon Pederssøn Beyer, Om Norgis Rige, 1567–70 [ The Kingdom of Norway, 1567–70 ] (Bergen : F. Beyer, 1928)
- (in Norwegian) Anonymous, “Oration om Mester Geble”, 1571, in: Ragnvald Iversen and Halkind Nilsen, editors, Dagbok og Oration om Mester Geble [ Diary and Oration of Master Geble ], 2 Volumes (Oslo : Universitetsfortaget [ University Publications ], 1963 and 1970)
- (in Norwegian) Peder Claussøn Friis, Samlede Skrifter [ Collected Works ] (Christiania (now Oslo) : A. W. Brøgger, 1881), page 336
- (in Norwegian) Ludvig Ludvigsen Daae, “Om Bergens Bispedømme i Middelalderen [ The Diocese of Bergen in the Middle Ages ]”, Historisk Tidsskrift [ Historical Journal ], Volume 3, No. 4, 1904 (Christiania (now Oslo) : Grøndahl & Sons, 1904), pages 110–115
- (in Norwegian) [Nils] Oluf Kolsrud: biography in Norsk Biografisk Leksikon, 1. Utgave, 10. Bind : Narve – Pedersen, Harald C. [ Norwegian Biographical Dictionary, 1st Edition, 10th Volume : Narve – Pedersen, Harald C. ] (Oslo : Aschehoug forlag, 1949), no pages given
- (in Norwegian) Ole Jørgen Benedictow, Fra rike til provins 1448–1536 [ From Kingdom to Province, 1448–1536 ], Volume 5 of Cappelens Norgeshistorie [ Cappelen's History of Norway ], 3rd Edition (Oslo : J. W. Cappelens Forlag, 1995), ISBN 82-02-15319-0
