= Hoskuld Hoskuldsson =

The Most Reverend Hoskuld Hoskuldsson
- Bishop of Stavanger
- Church: Roman Catholic
- Diocese: Diocese of Stavanger
- Appointed: 1513
- Term ended: 1537

Orders
- Consecration: 19 June 1513

Personal details
- Born: c. 1476/75
- Died: c. 1537

Hoskuld Hoskuldsson (1465/1470 – c.1537) was the 28th and last Roman Catholic Bishop of Stavanger, from 1513 until the Reformation in 1537, and also a member of the Riksråd.

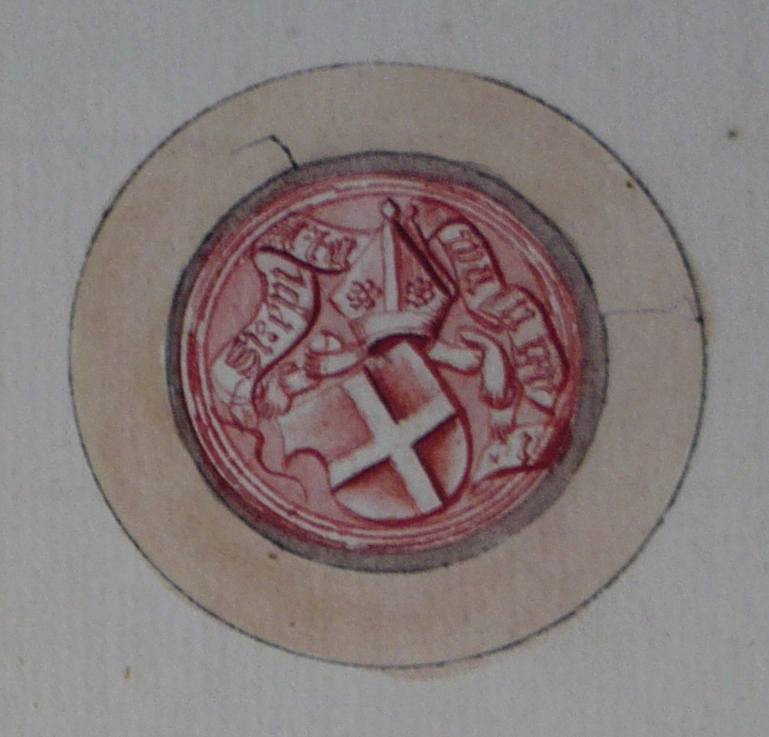
Seal of Hoskuld Hoskuldsson in 1524. Drawing of Terkel Klevenfeldt ( 1710 – 1777 ), National Archives of Denmark, Copenhagen, Klevenfeldt Private Collection, Packet 50. Photo: Arne Kvitrud in 2007

== Background ==
Hoskuld is thought to have been from the local gentry of Ryfylke in Norway, because his known writings showed words and phrases from the dialect of Ryfylke. He was enrolled in 1491 at the University of Rostock in Germany and graduated two years later with a Magister's degree. He held services at the cathedral chapter in Stavanger, where he was described as an archdeacon. He was elected as the Bishop of Stavanger in 1513 and consecrated in Rome on 19 June in the same year. For the rest of his life, he used a cross as his personal seal, with several variations, for the documents of his diocese and the Riksråd.

== The Dispute with the Abbot of the Utstein Monastery ==
Hoskuld came early into a serious conflict with the abbot of the Utstein Abbey. In 1515 the abbot, Henrik of Utstein, complained to the King of Denmark and Norway, Christian II, about the treatment he and his monastery had been getting from Bishop Hoskuld. Accused of "unpredictable realities" [ Wskelligt leffnet ] by the Bishop, Henrik had been brought to Stavanger and "put in the tower and irons" [ i tårn og jern ] in a bloody state. Hoskuld had accused Henrik of being a heretic. He also sent his servants to the Utstein Abbey to arrest a woman there. Hoskuld had her tortured, forcing her to lie about Henrik and herself. He then sent her to Sweden. The King ordered six clerics to judge and settle the dispute but the verdict is not known.

What is known is that Hoskuld afterwards sided with the next King of Denmark and Norway, Frederick I, especially after 1521, when Christian II had the Bishop's kinsman, Orm Eriksson, tried and executed on the charges of leading a tax revolt in Rogaland. In the autumn of 1523, together with the Bishop of Bergen, Olav Torkelsson, and the rikshovmester [ Lord High Steward ] of Norway, Nils Henriksson of Austrått ( who died soon afterwards), Hoskuld called for a meeting in Bergen to deliver the support at the Bergenhus to Frederick.

== The National Council ==
Since he became the Bishop of Stavanger, Hoskuld was a member of the Riksråd [ National Council ] and participated in meetings in Oslo and Copenhagen. On 15 June 1524, King Frederick I of Denmark appointed the Archbishop of Nidaros, Olav Engelbrektsson; the Bishop of Stavanger, Hoskuld Hoskuldsson; the Bishop of Bergen, Olav Torkelsson; and Vincens Lunge ( the son-in-law of Nils Henriksson ) to be advisers to the stattholders for Norway north of Lindesnes. On 5 August 1524, at the meeting of the Riksråd of Norway in Bergen, all the councilors, including Hoskuld, swore their allegiance to King Frederick, two days before his coronation in Copenhagen.

== The War of the Two Kings ==
In 1529 Norway and Bishop Hoskuld were plunged into a war-like situation. The former king Christian II was raiding their old kingdom with the aim to make himself the King of Norway again. At this time also began the followers of Martin Luther were beginning to assert themselves. Hoskuld, always concerned about his Church's safety and security, wrote letters of complaints about them. In a rare burst of emotion, he asked the new rikshovmester of Norway, Eske Bille, to keep him away from "the damned infidels and Lutherans, many of whom are blinded in their hearts, but punish them wherever it is needed" [ den fordömte vantro og lutheri, hvoraf mange i hjærtet ere forblindede, men straffe dem, hvor det behøvedes ]. The Bishop was also afraid that Vincens Lunge was going to secularize the Ustein Monastery; that was the reason for their falling out at the meeting in 1531 in Copenhagen. Meanwhile, the soldiers of King Christian II were shipped to the south of Norway, leading Eske Bille to request the help from Hoskuld but the Bishop declined. In 1532, Hoskuld gave the money to King Christian's viceroy but wrote that that was not for the support of the King but in fear of the ships that came with him to Agder in that year. A long series of letters to and from Bishop Hoskuld has been preserved for the first half of 1532, covering the campaigns and battles of King Christian II in his attempt to take control of Norway. Both parties tried to get Bishop Hoskuld to side with them but he did not want to take sides in the strife. In July 1532 Christian II was captured. His supporters, including the Archbishop of Nidaros, were politically weakened as the result. But Bishop Hoskuld still would not make a stand in the controversy and, for the next several years, he ran into problems for his explanations. On 8 May 1536, Hoskuld abstained from the royal election. Everyone in the National Council of Norway but one chose Christian III as the next King of Norway. The exception was Bishop Hoskuld – who had not spoken out – but he was pressured to affix his seal and signature to the proclamation a month later.

Hoskuld was a careful and distinctly peaceful man who did not wish to interfere with the political struggles of Denmark. At the same time he had hoped and believed that it would still be possible to preserve both the Catholic faith and the church's properties in his diocese.

== The Reformation ==
Thomas B. Willson, the British historian, wrote in 1903 that, "as long as Eske Bille remained in power, the bishop was left alone." He had Bille to deliver his present of a silver bowl to King Christian III. According to the Danish historian Arild Huitfeldt in 1595, Truid Ulfstand then brought the Bishop of Stavanger to Copenhagen as a prisoner in 1537. In a case from 1607, it was stated that Tord Rodt, the governor of the Bergenhus, had caught Hoskuld, "taken all that was under the Bishop and placed them under the King" [ tatt alt som lå under biskopen og lagt det under kongen ]. Peder Claussøn Friis wrote in the early 1600s that Hoskuld was captured along with the other bishops in 1536 and died in Bergen in 1537 or 1538. However, the contemporary details of the Bishop's actual capture and imprisonment could not be found.

== Sources ==
- (in Norwegian) Unni Kurseth, Hoskuld Hoskuldsson. Den siste katolske biskop av Stavanger 1513-37 [ Hoskuld Hosuldsson, the Last Catholic Bishop of Stavanger ], historical thesis, University of Oslo, 1985.
- (in Norwegian) Arne Kvitrud, "Personer, familier og slekter i og i tilknytning til Stavanger i perioden 1400-1599 [ People, Families and Ancestors in and related to Stavanager in the Period of 1400-1599 ]", posted 8 November 2004 and revised 7 April 2009, Lokalhistorie og Slektshistorie i hovedsak knyttet til Stavanger go Luster, retrieved 19 February 2013.
- (in Norwegian) Byhistorisk Forening Stavanger [ Historical Society of the City of Stavanger ], "1537 Archived 2014-01-06 at the Wayback Machine", Årringer i byhistorien [ Decades in the History of the City ], posted 8 November 2007.
- (in Norwegian) Halvard Bjørkvik, "Hoskold Hoskoldsson", Norsk Biografisk Leksikon [ Norwegian Biographical Dictionary ], retrieved 6 January 2014.
