= Mogens Svale =

Mogens Svale (c.1530–1581) was a Danish-born military commander and landowner in Norway. Svale is noted for his merits during the Northern Seven Years' War (1563-1570).

Mogens Svale was from a noble lower Danish family. He was the son of Verner Bertelsen Svale (died 1561) who was a judge on the island of Fyn in the central part of Denmark. He was enlisted in service at Akershus Fortress in Norway, during 1557 and 1561. In 1559, he was in charge of the blockhouse on the island of Flekkeroy in Kristiansand. In 1565, he was assigned a command in the region of Solør, which shared an eastern border with Sweden. During the Northern Seven Years' War, Swedish forces launched attacks into Eastern Norway. Mogens Svale fought several successful battles against invading Swedish armies in this border area. In 1568, he was promoted to the rank of Captain.

Mogens Svale was married twice; 1) to Ingri Eriksdatter, widow of Oluf Tordsen, 2) with Maren Bjelke (1555-1594), daughter of Jens Tillufsson Bjelke (d. 1559) and Lucie Nilsdatter (d. 1555), daughter of Nils Henriksson (ca. 1455–1523) and Inger Ottesdotter Rømer of Austrått (ca. 1475-1555).
