= Jens Tillufssøn Bjelke =

Norwegian noble (died 1559)

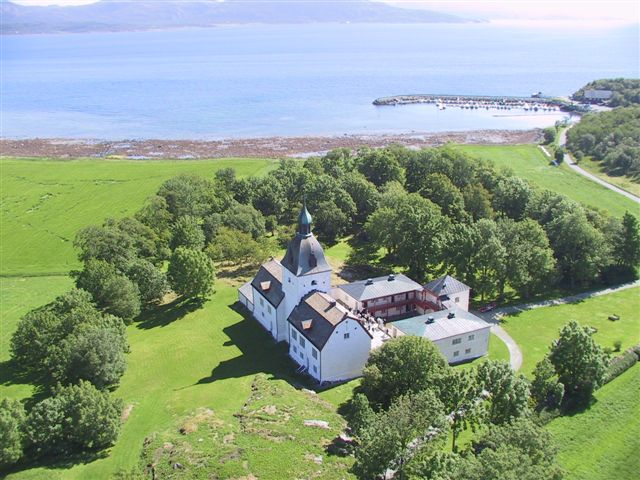
Austrått Manor

Jens Tillufssøn Bjelke (died in Copenhagen, 14 October 1559) was a Danish-Norwegian nobleman and a feudal lord of Jemtland, Norway, was originally from Danish Skåne (now Swedish). Jens Tillufssøn Bjelke was one of several notable Danes who acquired land, resided permanently in Norway, became thoroughly Norwegian and founded new Norwegian noble families, which replaced the old nobility of the first rank. He was the grandfather of Chancellor Jens Ågessøn Bjelke and great-grandfather of Governor Jorgen Bjelke.

== Up and coming ==
The first recorded mention of Jens indicates that he was a secretary for the bishop in then-Danish Lund in 1534. He came to Norway in 1537 in Christoffer Huitfeldt’s service, when Lutheran Protestantism was being promoted in the Trondheim region. During the Reformation, Nidarholm Abbey on the island of Munkholmen, was the stronghold of Olav Engelbrektsson, the last Roman Catholic Archbishop of Nidaros. Bjelke served in the fleet led by Jens Splid which besieged Archbishop Engelbrektsson’s men at Nidarholm in 1537; they were forced to surrender. Bjelke was awarded the Abbey and its property as compensation for his services. He exchanged Munkholmen for Tautra island; from there he served as the feudal overlord of Jemtland, on the Norwegian-Swedish border beginning in 1542 and continuing until his death.

== Personal life ==
His parents were Thilluf Josefsson of Gyllarp and Gunhild Ovesdatter Bing. Together with his wife Lady Lucie Nilsdatter, he resided at Austrått Manor beginning in 1540 and owned the manor from 1552 until his death on 14 October 1559. Jens Tillufssøn Bjelke was one of several notable Danes who acquired land, resided permanently in Norway, became thoroughly Norwegian and founded new Norwegian noble families, which replaced the old nobility of the first rank. He was the grandfather of Chancellor Jens Ågessøn Bjelke and great-grandfather of Governor Jorgen Bjelke, Admiral Henrik Bjelke and Chancellor Ove Bjelke.

As a Protestant, Jens naturally came into contact with Nils Henriksson and Lady Ingerd Ottesdatter as well as their daughter, Lucie Nilsdatter. Lucie was the center of a social scandal of some substance for the age. Niels Lykke (1492–1535) had married Eline Nilsdatter, the third of five daughters of Nils Henriksson. After her sister Eline’s death in 1532, Lucie cared for Eline’s children and ultimately conceived a child by Niels Lykke. Niels was put to death for incest by Archbishop Engelbrektsson in 1535. Jens and Lucie subsequently married in 1540, and his correspondence thereafter came from Austrått Manor. In 1545 Jens Tillufssøn requested and received a royal pardon for himself, his wife and their children, in which King Christian III affirmed there would be no indictment against Lucie for incest. Lady Inger formally transferred the title of Austrått to Lucie and Jens; records show that the transfer was confirmed by the king in 1552. There has been speculation that Lucie’s scandal allowed Jens, who descended from lesser nobility, to be considered "good enough" for Lucie.

Lucie drowned in 1555 while on a voyage off Sunnmøre and Jens died in Copenhagen five years later. Åge Bjelke (1552–1603), who was the youngest of five sons, took over the Austrått Manor at the age of 7 years. Åge’s maternal uncle Henrik Nielssøn served as his guardian.
