= Gyldenløve (noble family) =

- Uradel; Nobility
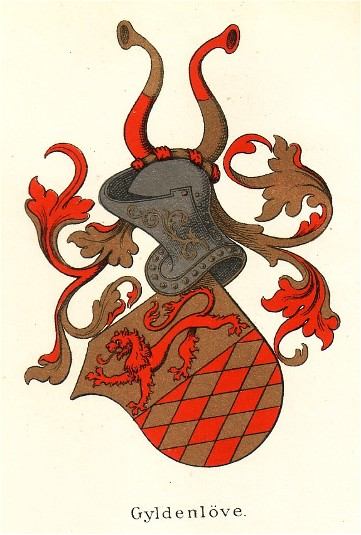
- Gyldenløve of Austrått.
- Parent family: House of Sverre (claimed)
- Members: Nils Henriksson; Inger Ottesdotter Rømer
- Estate: Austrått

For the royal illegitimate sons in Denmark-Norway, see Gyldenløve.

The Gyldenløve family (English: lit. Golden Lion) is the modern name of a medieval and now extinct family of the Norwegian nobility.

== History ==
During the Late Middle Ages Gyldenløve was one of the most important families in Norway's social and political life. The family's most prominent member was Nils Henriksson (died 1523), Lord High Steward of Norway, whose wife was Lady Inger Ottesdotter Rømer, heiress of Austrått. The couple's only surviving children were girls. All other agnatic lines of the old family are presumed extinct even earlier. The last male was Nils Henriksson's illegitimate child Henrik Nilsson Gyldenløve.

Like other Norwegian noble families, the Gyldenløve family did not originally have a family name. However, based on the family's coat of arms, which shows a lion, believed to represent their verified royal descent from the House of Sverre, some of the members of the very last generations used the name Gyldenløve as a family name. Today, the same practice is customary among historians and genealogists, in order to identify families and their members.

== Literature ==
- Gjerset, Knut. The History of the Norwegian People MacMillan, 1915.
- Larson, Karen. A History of Norway Princeton University Press, 1948.
