= Diocese of Bergen =

Diocese of Bergen (Bjørgvin) may refer to the following ecclesiastical jurisdictions with episcopal see in Bergen (Bjørgvin), Norway:

- the pre-Reformation Catholic Ancient Diocese of Bergen (initially Selja)
- the contemporary Lutheran Lutheran Diocese of Bjørgvin
