= Bergenhus len =

Historic administrative division in Norway

Bergenhus len was an administrative division of the Kingdom of Norway that existed from 1503 to 1662, with the Bergenhus Fortress in Bergen as its administrative center Norwegian administrative division. The len was changed to an amt (district) in 1662 but it kept its original name and capital until 1919.

== History ==
Formerly, in Norway, the term len (plural len) represents an administrative region whose borders roughly match those of the counties of today. It was an essential part of the national administration during the years when the two kingdoms of Denmark and Norway were united as a single kingdom. At the beginning of the 16th century the political divisions were variable but, since 1503, there were four main slottslen (castle provinces), each with about 30 smaller sub-divisions. They were:

- Akershus
- Båhus
- Bergenhus
- Trondheim (with Northern Norway)

Until 1660, their headquarters were, respectively, Akershus Fortress, Bohus Fortress, Bergenhus Fortress and the fortified city of Trondheim. The sub-divisions corresponded to the present church districts of the Lutheran Church of Norway.

In 1536, North Norway was added to the len of Bergenhus but the len still had about 30 sub-divisions. In 1560, they were:

- Lister (Eastern half of Vest-Agder)
- Stavanger (including Rogaland)
- Lofoten and Vesterålen
- Lyster (now Luster)
- Nordfjord
- Sunnmøre
- Helgeland
- Salten
- Hardanger
- Andenes (Andøya)
- Senja (South Troms)
- Troms (Middle and North Troms)
- Vardøhus (including Finnmark).

They covered the areas of the modern Vestland county (previously Hordaland and Sogn og Fjordane). Trondheim and North Norway were still parts of the Bergenhus len. Since then, the number of the len's sub-divisions was gradually reduced as the provincial and national administrations both became more stable. By 1660, Bergenhus was one of Norway's nine main len, each with 17 sub-divisions.

On 19 February 1662, by royal decree, all the len, including Bergenhus, were renamed as amt (plural amt), and their lenmann were recast as the amtmann, both from Amt, the German word for "office", reflecting the bias of the Danish court of that year.

In 1671, Norway was divided once more, this time into four principal amt or stiftsamt and nine subordinate amt. Bergenhus amt was the stiftsamt and its subordinate amt were Halsnøy klostergods, Hardanger amt and Nordlandene amt.

In 1763, Bergenhus was divided in two, creating the following amt – Nordre Bergenhus amt and Søndre Bergenhus amt.

In 1919, Nordre Bergenhus amt was renamed as Sogn og Fjordane fylke (county) and Søndre Bergenhus amt became Hordaland fylke, and each of their amtmann were retitled as a fylkesmann (country governor). In 2020, the counties of Hordaland and Sogn og Fjordane merged into the new Vestland county.

== Lensherrer (Governors) of the Bergenhus len, between 1489 and 1570 ==
- 1489- : Otte Matssøn
- 1496- : David Sinclar
- 1501- : Anders Mus
- 1502 - 1504 : Olav Ottessøn (son of Otte Matssøn)
- 1502 - 1503 : Bishop Hans of Bergen
- 1503 - 1507 : Henrik Bagge
- 1506- : Mogens Jenssøn
- 1508- : Hans Kruckow
- 1509- : Lauritz Jenssøn
- -1514 : Hermann Willumssøn
- 1514 - 1523 : Jørgen Hanssøn
- 1523 - 1523 : Hans Knutssøn (substituting for Jørgen Hanssøn)
- 1523 - 1529 : Vincent Lunge
- 1529 - 1537 : Eske Bille
- 1537 - 1542 : Tord Rodt
- 1542 - 1556 : Christoffer Huidtfelt
- 1556 - 1559 : Christoffer Valkendorff
- 1559 - 1568 : Erik Rosenkrantz
- 1568-: Mathias Scheel
