= Jon Guttormssøn =

Norwegian priest and bishop

- Born: Unknown; Norway
- Died: 20 September 1577
- Occupation: Lutheran superintendent

Jon Guttormssøn (died 20 September 1577) was a Norwegian priest and Lutheran bishop.

He was appointed Lutheran superintendent (bishop) in the Diocese of Stavanger in 1541, the first Lutheran bishop in Stavanger, and the second in Norway. His task was to carry through changes in accordance to the Reformation in Denmark–Norway. He administered considerable restorations of Stavanger Cathedral, and transformed the Stavanger Cathedral School into a school for Lutheran priests. In 1557 he resigned from his position as superintendent, due to lack of economic resources.

== Bishop of Stavanger ==
Before Jon Guttormsen became superintendent, he was canon in Stavanger. In the spring 1541, Jon Guttormson was appointed superintendent in Stavanger.

In the period 1554–1556, Jon Guttormson carried out extensive restoration work on Stavanger Cathedral. He also entertained two students from the Stavanger area in Copenhagen.

We lack sources that tell in particular about how he performed his tasks.

== Retirement ==
On January 22, 1557, it was written in a royal letter that Jon Guttormson had resigned as superintendent, in another royal letter of June 10, 1557, it is stated that Jon was deposed. Peder Claussøn Friis wrote that Jon Guttormson was deposed. Absalon Pedersson Beyer wrote that Jon Guttormson had been complained about and had neglected his calling, and that he had resigned his office in Copenhagen. What is right is not easy to say, but it is not unreasonable that Jon was asked to resign, in return for some compensation.

A letter of complaint to the king is known. It is not signed or dated, but from the content it is reasonable to believe that it was written by Jon Guttormson. It was a long list of matters that the scribe thought the king should sort out. The letter and a possible oral ultimatum may have led to Jon either being fired or resigning himself.

On June 10, 1557, Jens Schjelderup became superintendent of both the dioceses of Stavanger and Bergen.

== Kanniken ==
In the years that followed, Jon Guttormson received income from many prebends, two parishes and the income that previously went to support students in Copenhagen. There may have been compensation for having resigned. He was also in dispute with the other canons about income. The resident canons, the servants of the church and the school complained that the canon Jon Guttormson had done them great injustice with some of their goods. He had given up something and kept something as if it were his own share. He alone uses fields and meadows near the town, as well as some grounds in the town - to which all the church servants and school servants had a party (possibly Pedersgjerdet). He paid his chaplain badly - like a regular worker.

== Death ==
On October 10, 1576, Jon Guttormson canon and pastor were in Stavanger, and probably died not long after. Jon Guttormson was probably dead before September 20, 1577.

== Family ==
Jon Guttormson was married to Anna Eriksdatter of the Orm family and is said to have had the children: Svale Jonson on Jarlsøy or Tysnesøy and Magdalena Jonsdatter.

Based on an asset in Evje, it has been speculated that Jon Guttormson could be from Agder, but it is unclear.

There were two portraits painted on wood in black canvas and with a gilded frame with a picture of Jon Guttormsen and Anna Eriksdatter. They were last mentioned in 1777. This may have been one of the oldest portrait paintings in Norway.

== Sources ==
- Ludvig Daae: Stavanger Diocese's second first Lutheran superintendents , undated special edition
- Johannes Elgvin: En by i kamp, Stavanger bys historie, 1536-1814 , Stavanger, 1956.
- Arne Kvitrud: Individuals, families and relatives in and in connection with Stavanger in the period 1400-1599, Stavanger, 2004 - http://www.kvitrud.no/stvgr.htm.
