= Gjeble Pederssøn =

Norwegian priest

The Right Reverend Gjeble Pederssøn
- Bishop of Bjørgvin
- Diocese: Bjørgvin
- Installed: 1536
- Term ended: 9 March 1557
- Predecessor: Olav Torkelsson
- Successor: Jens Pedersen Schjelderup

Personal details
- Born: 1490 Dønna, Norway
- Died: 18 April 1607 (aged 56–57) Bergen, Norway
- Education: University of Leuven (Mag.art)

Gjeble Pederssøn (c.1490 – 9 March 1557) was a Norwegian priest who was the first Lutheran bishop in Norway.

Pederssøn was born at Teigstad on the island of Dønna in Nordland county, Norway. His father was a councilman in Bergen. He went to school in Trondheim and was later a student at Bergen Cathedral School. Later he traveled to the Netherlands and studied in the city of Alkmaar. He also studied at the University of Leuven during the period 1513 and 1514. After a few years of education abroad he took his magister degree. He returned to work at a school in Bergen. In 1518 he became canon and priest at St Mary's Church in Bergen.

In 1536, he was elected the bishop at Bergen, but the appointment came as the Protestant Reformation was also arriving in Norway. He thus became the first Lutheran bishop in Norway, serving as bishop in Bergen stift from 1536 (ordinated in 1537) until his death in 1557. He devoted much of his time as bishop in his efforts to initiate reform of the church. In this regard, he found an ally in Hans Gaas (1500–1578), bishop of the Diocese of Nidaros, who was also active in the reform process. Gjeble also helped young, gifted men with education, principally for the priesthood. Among the students whose education he sponsored was Absalon Pederssøn Beyer (1528–1575) who was appointed lecturer in theology at Bergen Cathedral School.

Religious titles
New creation After the Kingdom of Denmark-Norway joined the Protestant Reformation	Bishop of Bjørgvin; 1536–1557	Succeeded by Jens Pedersen Schjelderup
