= Strange Jørgenssøn =

Danish/Norwegian businessman and bailiff

- Born: 7 April 1539; Faaborg, Denmark
- Died: 5 February 1610 (aged 70); Bergen, Norway
- Occupations: businessman and bailiff
- Notable work: institution for poor women in Bergen
- Parents: Jørgen van der Huus (father); Margrethe Bullgers (mother)

Strange Jørgenssøn (7 April 1539 – 5 February 1610) was a Danish/Norwegian businessman and bailiff. He was born in Faaborg; the son of Jørgen van der Huus and Margrethe Bullgers. He served as bailiff of Lyse Abbey, Munkeliv Abbey, Giske, and Nordland. He established an institution for poor women in Bergen 1609. He died in Bergen in 1610.
