= Orm Eriksson =

Norwegian nobleman

Orm Eriksson (also Orm Eiriksson, c. 1476 – 1521) was a Norwegian nobleman living in Stavanger and the alleged leader of the tax revolt in Rogaland, which ended with his execution in 1521.

== Background ==
It is uncertain whether Orm Erikson of Voss in 1482 was the same as the citizen and later væpner (squire) Orm Erikson of Stavanger. Asgaut Steinnes wrote in 1961 that the Orm Erikson of 1484 and the Orm Erikson of 1497 were the same man.

== In Stavanger ==
Orm Erikson is known to have been in the city records of Stavanger before 1518. The earliest mention of him was dated 17 June 1490, when he was one of the witnesses of a legal document. He did not have at that time a title of nobility. But sometime between 1490 and 1509, he gained the title of væpner (squire). He was first mentioned as a væpner in 1509. A year later, in 1510, Orm Eriksson av våpen (with his coat-of-arms) and wife Astrid Ormsdotter bought the Hana farm in Sandnes. The document was created at Skagen in Stavanger. This is the only document linking Orm Erikson to any particular place in the Stavanger area. It is possible that Orm Erikson was then living at Skagen. In two documents, which were definitely from Stavanger, Orm Erikson was described as a væpner.

== The Tax Revolt ==
The war between Denmark-Norway and Sweden ended in March 1520 when, as one of the conditions of the settlement, the Swedes accepted Christian II as the King of Sweden. But the settlement came with a price. Rogaland, like the other areas of Norway, had been obliged to supply extra taxes and men to support the war. In 1518 the king levied an additional tax of two marks but in 1519, a punitive tax of two marks was assessed in Rogaland for the rebellion against the two-mark tax. In 1521 another 10% wealth tax was added.

Sometime in the fall of 1519, Jon Eilivsson was imprisoned in Bergen. The illegitimate son of the former bishop of Stavanger, Eiliv Jonsson, he had been asked by the commoners in Ryfylke to deliver their letter to the king to have their taxes reduced but was arrested before he could accomplish his mission. From prison, he wrote a letter of complaint to the King. He wrote that there was violence in the conflict between the commoners and the lensherre (governor) of Bergenhus len, Jørgen Hansson. Eilivsson believed, however, that many used more violence than he himself did. He wrote that Orm Erikson was a traitor. He knew Orm, who had been one of the witnesses of the will of Jon's father. Jon claimed that Orm had kept things, chased away the priest Torkild with guns and would have killed him. Orm was a nobleman but, at that time, he was neither a lagmann (judge) nor a fogd (bailiff) so he did not have the legal authority. But Eilivsson never revealed the reasons for any of Eriksson's actions as well as the identity of Father Torkild. Torkild may be the priest who had left the Diocese of London in England for the University of Rostock in Germany in 1519 to further his studies. He was known to have been ordained in the summer of 1519 so the altercation with Orm Eriksson might have happened at that time. It is possible that Hoskuld Hoskuldsson, who succeeded Eiliv Jonson as the Bishop of Stavanger, sent Torkild abroad for the studies to keep him away from Orm and the authorities for a while. Sending possible witnesses out of the diocese was one of the bishop's usual tactics of dealing with problems; he had done it before in his dispute with the abbot of Utstein Abbey. Rostock was one of his favored hiding places; he had studied at the university there.

Because of the letter from Jon Eilivsson, Christian II and Jørgen Hansson began their own investigations, but these investigations were slow. Orm was a member of the nobility and a relative of the Bishop of Stavanger. Torkild was out of the country and could not be questioned, and the farmers in Ryfylke and Rogaland were not cooperative. Unni Kurseth believed that Jon Eilivsson's letter was actually penned by one of the bailiffs of Bergenhus, possibly with either the blessing or support of the governor, to frame Orm Eriksson for the tax revolt in Rylfylke.

In response, Orm Eriksson tried to smoothen his relationships with Jørgen Hansson and the others with gifts and money. Around 20 September 1519, he gave Hansson a buck. A year later, on 7 September 1520 Orm Erikson paid his taxes with 83 lodd (2.9 ounces or 83 grams) of silver and 83 marks, 10% of his entire income. He sent two marks to the city of Stavanger and six marks, as well as butter, to the Bergenhus. Hansson accepted all the gifts but he put all of them in the public accounts of the Bergenhus.

But gifts and money were still not enough for Eriksson to avoid arrest. In 1521, he was arrested in Stavanger. The city records of Stavanger showed that he was subsequently hanged. The actual date of his execution is not known but it was apparently done just before 8 May 1521. The king confiscated 50% of Orm Erikson's properties and the widow was allowed to keep the rest of them. As for Jon Eilivsson, he was not spared. He was also executed in Bergen as a tax rebel in late 1519, sometime between October and December, and his properties were also confiscated.

== Literature ==
- (in Norwegian) H[enrik]. J[ørgen]. Huitfledt[-Kaas], editor, Norske regnskaber og jordebøger fra det 16de aarhundrede [Norwegian Tax and Property Registers] (NRJ), Vol. 1 ( 1514 - 1521 ) ( Christiania ( now Oslo ) : J. Chr. Gundersens Bogtrykkeri [ Publications ], 1885 - 1887 )
- (in Norwegian) H[enrik]. J[ørgen]. Huitfledt[-Kaas], editor, Norske regnskaber og jordebøger fra det 16de aarhundrede [Norwegian Tax and Property Registers] (NRJ), Vol. 2 ( 1516 - 1521 ) ( Christiania ( now Oslo ) : J. Chr. Gundersens Bogtrykkeri, 1888 - 1896 )
- (in Norwegian) H[enrik]. J[ørgen]. Huitfledt[-Kaas], editor, Norske regnskaber og jordebøger fra det 16de aarhundrede [Norwegian Tax and Property Registers] (NRJ), Vol. 3 ( 1518 - 1523 ) ( Christiania ( now Oslo ) : J. Chr. Gundersens Bogtrykkeri, 1905 )
- (in Norwegian) E[rik]. A[ndreas]. Thomle and P[eter Olsen]. Groth, eds.: Norske Herredags dombøger, Anden Række (1607-1623) [ Norwegian National Council and Cathedral Registers, Second Part, 1607-1623 ] ( Christiania (now Oslo) : S. M. Brydes Bogtrykkeri, 1904 - 1929 )
- (in Danish) "Orm", Danmarks Adels Aarbog 1907, 24. Aargang [ Yearbook of the Nobility of Denmark, 1907, 24th Volume ], edited by H[ans]. R[udolf]. Hiort-Lorenzen and A[nders]. Thiset ( Copenhagen : Vilhelm Trydes Boghandel [ William Tryde Publications ], 1907 ), pages 331-332.
- (in Norwegian) Asgaut Steinnes, "Mats-sønene og ætta deira [ Matssons and Their Families ]", Norsk Slektshistorisk Tidsskrift [ Norwegian Family History Journal ], bind [ Volume ] VIII, 1942, pages 305-349.
- (in Norwegian) Asgaut Steinnes, "Eivind Johansson på Få og den næraste ætta hans [ Elvind Johansson and His Nearest Relatives ]", Ætt og heim [ Family and Home ], Stavanger, 1952.
- (in Norwegian) Asgaut Steinnes, "Nokre Galtung-problem [ Some Galtung Problems ]", Norsk Slektshistorisk Tidsskrift, bind XVIII, 1961, pages 1–40.
- (in Norwegian) Odd Handegård, Vår felles slektshistorie, Hardanger, Sunnhordland og Ryfylke [ Our Common Family History of Hardanger, Sunnhordland and Ryfylke ]
- (in Norwegian) Unni Kurseth, Hoskuld Hoskuldsson. Den siste katolske biskop av Stavanger 1513-37 [ Hoskuld Hosuldsson, the Last Catholic Bishop of Stavanger ], historical thesis, University of Oslo, 1985.
- (in Norwegian) Arne Kvitrud, "Orm på Vestlandet [ Orm of the West Country ], posted 8 November 2004 and revised 21 April 2007, Lokalhistorie og Slektshistorie i hovedsak knyttet til Stavanger go Luster [ Local and Family History, Mainly Related to Stavanger and Luster ], retrieved 19 February 2013.
- (in Norwegian) Arne Kvitrud, "Personer, familier og slekter i og i tilknytning til Stavanger i perioden 1400-1599 [ People, Families and Ancestors in and related to Stavanager in the Period of 1400-1599 ]", posted 8 November 2004 and revised 7 April 2009, Lokalhistorie og Slektshistorie i hovedsak knyttet til Stavanger go Luster, retrieved 19 February 2013.
