= Nils Lykke =

Danish-Norwegian nobleman (1492–1535)

- Born: c.1492 Denmark
- Died: 24 December 1535; Steinvikholm Castle, Norway
- Occupations: Nobleman, feudal lord and member of the Riksråd
- Relatives: Inger Ottesdotter Rømer (mother-in-law); Nils Henriksson (father-in-law)

Nils Lykke (c. 1492 – 24 December 1535) was a Danish-Norwegian nobleman, feudal lord (lensherre) and member of the Riksråd in Norway. He was the son of Danish Riksråd member and landowner Joachim Lykke and Maren Bille. In 1528 he married Eline Nilsdatter (died 1532), daughter of Nils Henriksson and Inger Ottesdotter Rømer. This was a period with strong conflicts between Lutheranism, which was supported by the Danish king, and Catholicism, whose highest representative in Norway was archbishop Olav Engelbrektsson. When Lykke had a child with his sister-in-law Lucie Nilsdatter, which was regarded as incest according to the law, he was imprisoned and held at the Steinvikholm Castle, and eventually executed following Engelbrektsson's order.
