= Christen Mule =

Norwegian merchant, Mayor of Oslo

Christian or Christen Mule (died 1589) was a merchant and Mayor of Oslo, Norway. He was probably a member of the family Mule from Denmark. Mule's parents have not been identified, but claims that he was the illegitimate son of the unpopular bishop Hans Mule, this were disputed by Edvard Bull the elder. Christian was the father of Thomas, Severin (Soren), Kristen, Bertel, and possibly Niels Mule.

== Mayor ==
The first mention of Mule is in 1555, when he is already a central figure in Oslo. He was an advocate for Oslo to the king in connection with the equipment of a warship. He appeared to have close ties to the Governor-general of Norway, Christen Munk, and was appointed mayor of Oslo by him in 1567. In 1579, king Frederick II gave the site of the ruins of the old Bishop's residence in Oslo to Mule, and Mule erected a new building there. Accommodation of prominent guests was a key aspect of belonging to the city's elite. The highlight in this respect was undoubtedly when the retired mayor hosted on 23 November 1589 the wedding of Christian IV's sister Anne of Denmark and James of Scotland.

Mule shared the mayoral office first with Niels Stub and later with Oluf Eriksson Glad, and is noted as mayor for the last time in 1585. One of Mule's sons Niels Kristensson Mule was Bailiff from 1572 to 1578. Another son, Bertel Mule was mayor of Oslo from 1605 to 1610, when he was appointed lawspeaker of the Uplands. He is the only example known of a father and son in the mayoral chair in Oslo before the fire in 1624.

== Seven Years' War ==
The favors that Mule received were largely motivated by his work during the siege of Akershus in 1567 during the Nordic Seven Years' War. Mule probably played a key role in the city's citizen militias and the funding of the defense of Akershus. Among other things, Mule's debt of 1000 krone to a Swede transferred to the Crown and after the war a loan to the lord of 250 krone. He took large losses when the city was burnt during the siege, and estimated the damage to house and property alone at 7000 krone.

== Trading ==
Details of Mule's trading activities are limited but it is known that he bought salt for 30 krone in 1557 and, in partnership with several others, bought hides and skin for 436 valleys and 20 shillings. During and after the war he claimed to have lost three large ships, respectively 100, 200 and 300 lasts. Mule was involved in the import of German beer. During the war he got a tariff exemption on imports of up to 2 lasts (24 barrels) tystøl. A few years later he asked the King for favor for his four sons, in the form of duty-free import of 6.4 lester Rostockerøl for each man.
