= Vardo =

Vardo or Vardø may refer to:

== Places ==
- Vardø Municipality, a municipality in Finnmark county, Norway
- Vardø (town), a town within Vardø Municipality in Finnmark county, Norway
- Vårdö, an island municipality in Åland, Finland
- Vartiosaari (Vårdö), a district of Helsinki, Finland

== People ==
- Vardo Rumessen (1942–2015), an Estonian musician and politician

== History ==
- Vardo (Romani wagon), the traditional horse-drawn wagon used by English Romani people

== See also ==
- Vardøya, an island in Vardø Municipality
- Vardos, an Australian musical group
