= Tordenstjerne (noble family) =

Norwegian noble family

- Nobility
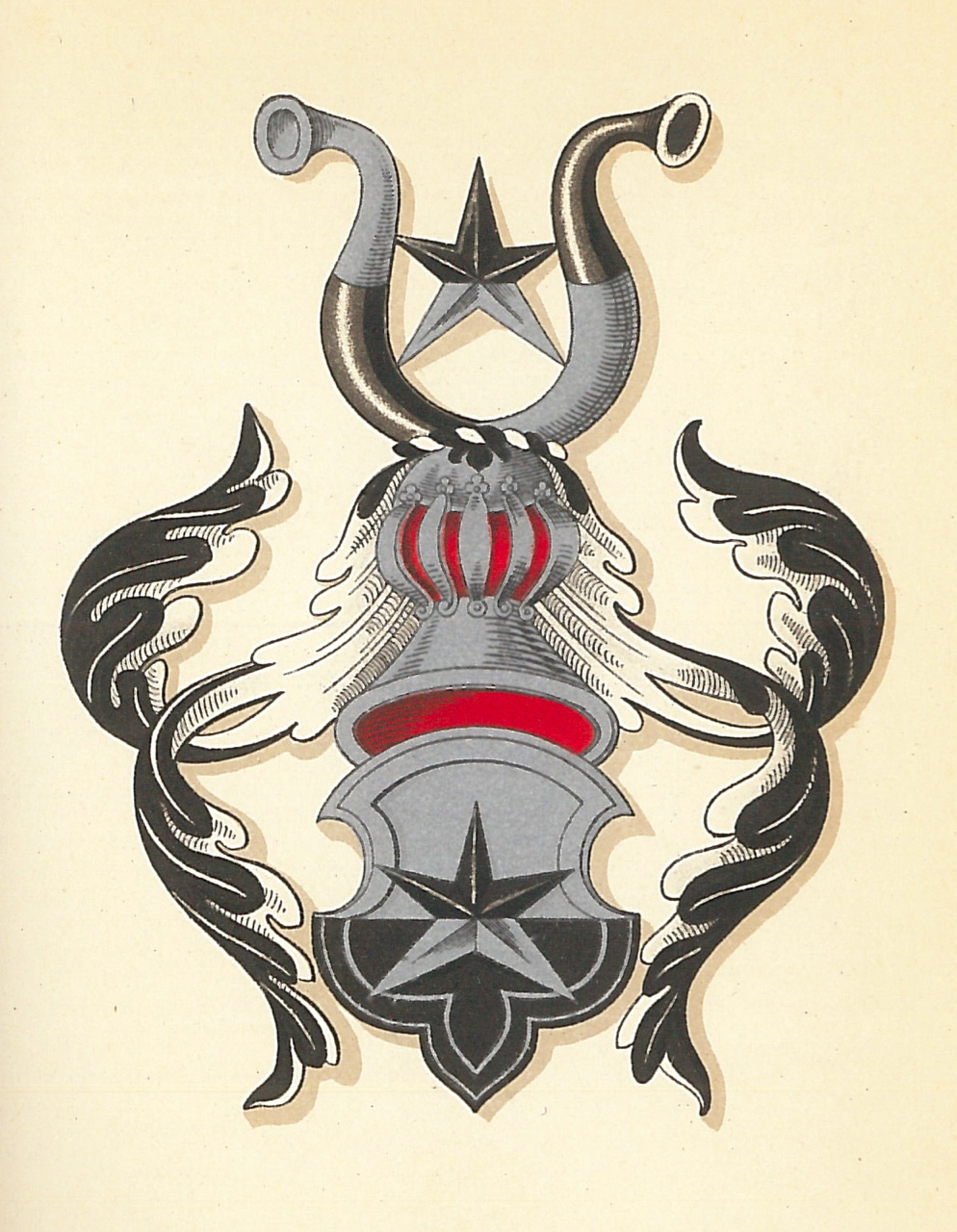
- Tordenstierne coat of arms.
- Country: Norway
- Founded: 20 July 1505 (ennoblement)
- Founder: Nils Sveinsson
- Titles: Squire; Junker
- Estate: Gullaug farm

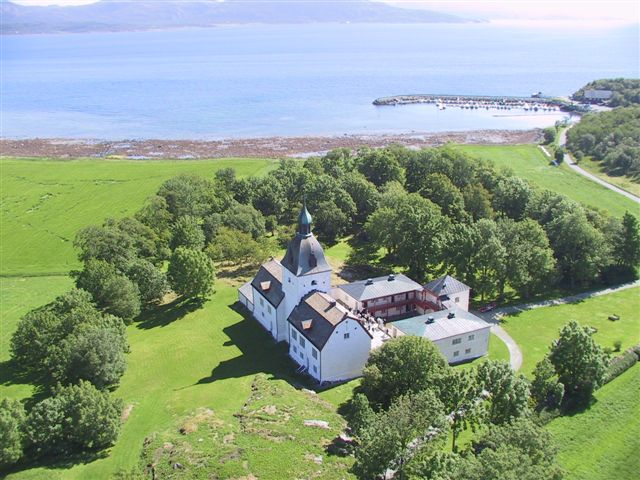

The Tordenstjerne family, also spelled Tordenstierne, was a Norwegian noble family.

== History ==
Nils Sveinsson was on 20 July 1505 ennobled by King John under the name Tordenstjerne (lit. Thunder Star) for his braveness in the capture of Vänersborg in Sweden. He achieved as well the title squire (Norwegian: væpner). It is said that he first was married to the Swedish noblewoman Eline Henriksdotter Måneskjold av Rise, but that the marriage was childless. Thereafter he married Ingeborg Torsteinsdotter, who was the daughter of Torstein Asseresson on the farm Saue of Frogner parish in Lier. They resided on the Gullaug farm in Lier. Their children were Kristoffer Nilsson Tordenstjerne til Solum, Laurits Nilsson Tordenstjerne til Steinshorn, and Jon Nilsson Tordenstjerne til Gullaug.

Jon Nilsson Tordenstjerne til Gullaug († allegedly in 1592) was followed by his son, Audun Jonsson Tordenstjerne til Gullaug. In 1626, his son Jon Audunsson Tordenstjerne til Gullaug († between 1648 and 1661) is mentioned. His son was Audun Jonsson Tordenstjerne til Gullaug, his grandson was Niels Audensen Tordenstierne til Gullaug, and his great-grandson was Auden Nielsen Tordenstierne.

On 5 February 1734, Niels Audensen Tordenstierne's noble status was confirmed by King Christian VI of Denmark. His son, Auden Nielsen Tordenstierne, grew up and went to Copenhagen, where he in 1753 became a secretary in the Danish chancery. He received the title court junker (Norwegian: hoffjunker) shortly afterwards.

It is told that after a while, he became half-witted. After his stays in Copenhagen and Paris, be got ill and returned to his seat farm Gullaug in Lier. He isolated himself in two rooms in one end of the house, the Red Chamber and the Blue Chamber. They were small and dark rooms into which the daylight hardly could reach because of the leaden windows. Tordenstierne never appeared in daytime, and in the evening and the night, he wandered in his garden and along the beach wearing a dark cloak and a dark mask before his face. He was accompanied by his servant, who was «a negro». The last Thunder Star died on 21 February 1771.

When the main building at Gullaug was rebuilt in 1843–44, there were found some letters and documents within the wall. They revealed that Tordenstierne had been in love with a farmer daughter. He had to give up his love because of his parents' dislike and his estate's demands.

== Coat of arms ==
Description: A divided shield, whereof the first field in white and the second field in black, whereover is placed a five-pointed star whereof the three upper points are black and the two lower points are white. On the helm a five-pointed star in ditto tinctures between two (European) bison horns divided in black and white, vice versa, respectively.

== See also ==
- Danish nobility
- Norwegian nobility

== Literature and sources ==
- Tore Vigerust: Biskop N. Dorphs fortegnelse på de adelige familier i Akershus stift, 2.1 1749
