= Lady Inger =

Play written by Henrik Ibsen

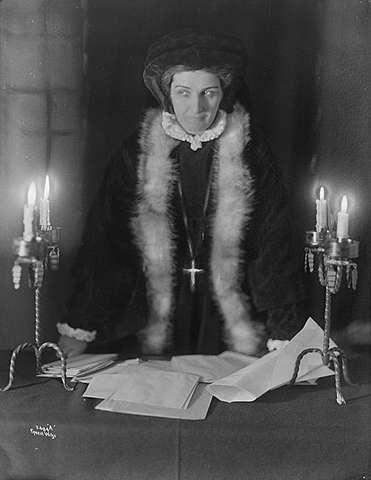
Agnes Mowinckel playing the part of Lady Inger in 1921.

Lady Inger (original title: Fru Inger til Østeraad) is an 1854 play by Henrik Ibsen, inspired by the life of Inger, Lady of Austraat. The play, the fourth work of the Norwegian's career, reflects the birth of Romantic Nationalism in the Norway of that period, and had a strongly anti-Danish sentiment. It centers on the Scandinavia of 1510–1540 as the Kalmar Union collapsed, the impacts of the Reformation were becoming evident in Norway, and a last desperate struggle was being mounted to maintain Norwegian independence. Its initial sentiments were so strongly anti-Danish that Ibsen ultimately toned them down.

Norwegian literature was virtually nonexistent during the period of the Scandinavian Union and the subsequent Dano-Norwegian union (1387—1814) — Ibsen characterized that period as "Four Hundred Years of Darkness." Ibsen was a major participant in a flood of nationalistic romanticism that followed the "Four Hundred Years of Darkness" and is recognized as one of the so-called "The Four Greats" of this period (the others being Bjørnstjerne Bjørnson, Alexander Kielland, and Jonas Lie). A unity of purpose pervades the whole period, recreation of a national culture based on the almost forgotten past. Subsequent research has shown the play Fru Inger til Østeraad deviates rather liberally from the actual historical events, and should be understood in its context as a statement of nationalism.

== See also ==
- Austrått
