= Nils Ravaldsson =

Norwegian rebel leader

- Died: 1505; Västergötland

Nils Ravaldsson (died 1505) was a leader of the Alvsson's rebellion. He was the leader of the rebellion after Knut Alvsson was murdered. Ravaldsson was also responsible for the construction of Olsborg Castle in 1502.

Ravaldsson did in the early stages of the rebellion an occupation of Marstrand and Sarpsborg, and became the leader of the rebellion in 1502 and was the leader until 1504 when the rebellion was crushed on Christmas night at Olsborg Castle in Båhuslen (then a part of Norway). Ravaldsson died in exile at a farm in Västergötland in Sweden the next year.

The castle was attacked by the forces of King Hans, while the people in the castle had a Christmas feast. Ragvaldsson was present in the castle during the attack, and he and his men fought the attacking forces for several hours. Ravaldsson escaped the carnage only by jumping from the top of the castle tower, and into a pile of snow. Ravaldsson died in exile at a farm in Västergötland the next year, probably from the wounds he received during the attack.
