= Cort Aslakssøn =

Norwegian astronomer, theologist and philosopher

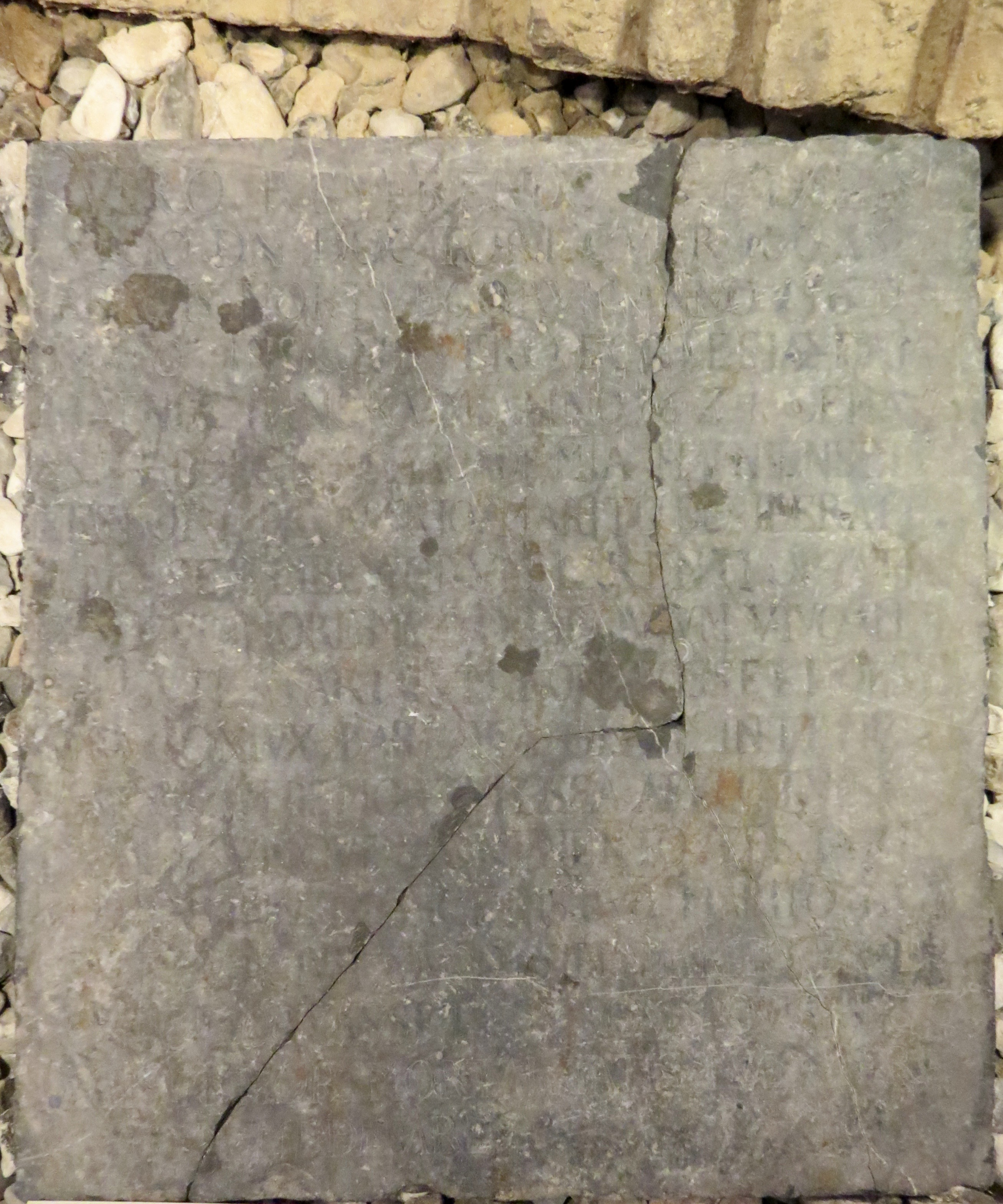
- Tombstone of Professor Aslaksen in the Church of Our Lady in Copenhagen.
- Born: 28 June 1564; Bergen
- Died: 7 February 1624 (aged 59)
- Education: University of Copenhagen
- Occupations: Astronomer, theologist and philosopher

Cort Aslakssøn (28 June 1564 – 7 February 1624) was a Norwegian astronomer, theologist and philosopher. He was the first Norwegian to become a professor at the University of Copenhagen.

== Biography ==
Aslakssøn was born in Bergen, Norway. He was the son of Aslak Magnussøn and Christina Jacobsdatter. He attended Bergen Cathedral School and after the death of his parents came under the patronage of Jens Pederssøn Schielderup (1509–1582), Bishop of Bergen. In 1578, he was transferred to the Latin school in Malmö. In 1584, he was enrolled at the University of Copenhagen. From 1590 to 1593 he worked as assistant for astronomer Tycho Brahe.

He subsequently embarked on a several-year study trip to various universities on the continent. He was appointed professor of Pedagogy at the University of Copenhagen from 1600. From 1600–1603 he served also as notary at the university with administrative duties. In 1605, he became dean of the Faculty of Arts. In 1606, he was appointed professor of Hebrew Language and from 1607 professor of Theology. He died in Copenhagen in 1624.

== Selected works ==
Cort Aslakssøn published numerous writings in various topics. His main work, De natura cæli triplicis, was published in 1597. Other notable works included Grammaticæ Hebrææ libri duo (1606), Physica et Ethica Mosaica (1613) and Historiske Beskriffuelse Om den Reformerede Religion (1622)
