= Olsborg Castle =

Ruined castle in Sweden

Olsborg Castle, Olofsborg
- Tanum Municipality, Sweden

Site information
- Controlled by: Sweden

Location
- Coordinates: 58.445333°N 11.343542°E

Site history
- Built: 1502
- Built by: Nils Ragvaldsson
- Demolished: 1531

Olsborg Castle (Swedish: Olsborg), also Olofsborg, was a fortified castle located in Tanum Municipality in Bohuslän, Sweden. It is situated on a steep cliff, and might previous to later use been an early hill fort.

== History ==
Olsborg was constructed in 1502 by the squire Nils Ravaldsson from Åby (died 1505), after a recent Norwegian-Swedish rebel attack on Viken. In May 1504, a one-year ceasefire was signed between the Swedish-Norwegian rebels and King Hans. However most of Olsborg was destroyed shortly after, when the forces of Scandinavian monarch King Hans attacked during the Christmas party in 1504.

After the turmoil created by the dethronement of the Danish king Christian II, the Swedes returned, seized the area and reconstructed Olsborg's fortifications. The brief Swedish rule of northern Bohuslän was administrated between 1523 and 1525 from Olsborg by the nobles Lars Siggesson (Sparre) (c. 1492-1554) and Ture Jönsson (Tre Rosor) (c.1475-1532) .

In 1525, the administration was moved to Karlsborg Castle, south of Hamburgsund. During these years, the castle defenses were improved, especially in 1526. During Christian II's attempt to retake his throne, the part of Bohuslän under Swedish rule was attacked, and both Karlsborg and Olsborg were destroyed by Norwegian forces in December 1531.

Decades later, several attempts to rebuild the castle was made by Sweden. Eric XIV in 1564 and Johan III in 1569 and 1570 both tried, but the attempts were unsuccessful and the castle remained in ruins. The ruins were still clearly visible during the early 20th century, when they were excavated by Swedish archaeologist Wilhelm Berg (1839-1915). Berg was the secretary of the Gothenburg and Bohuslän Antiquities Association and had also excavated the Ragnhildsholmen fortification at Kungahälla during the 1880s.
