= Tamperret =

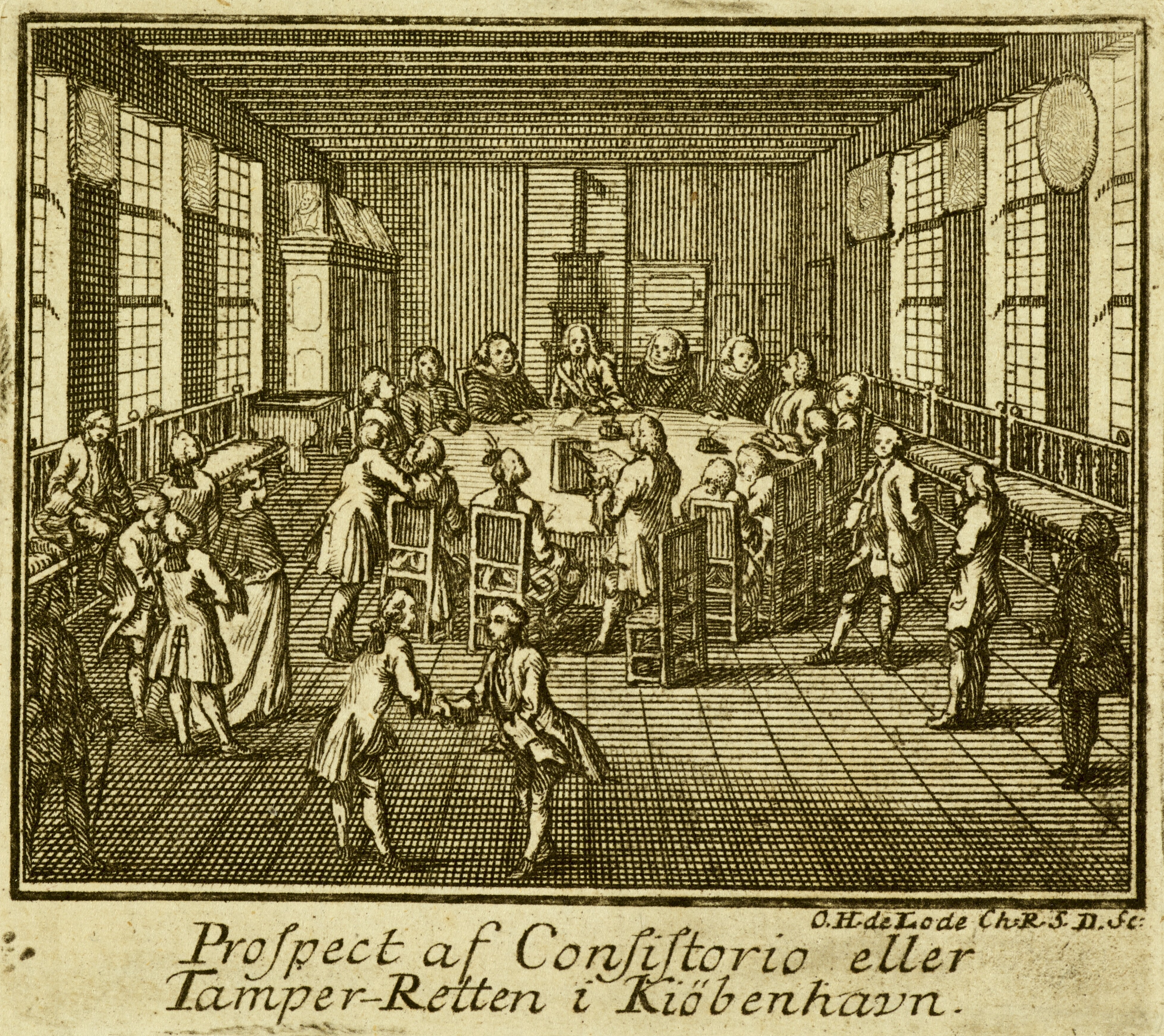
From 1681, the tamperret of the diocese of Zealand consisted of the leadership of the University of Copenhagen along with the amtmand of the diocese, depicted here in a chalcography by Odvardt Helmoldt von de Lode.

The Tamperret, or "Tamper Court", was a special court in Denmark-Norway which existed from 1542 to 1797. The Tamper Courts dealt with matters of marriage, including betrothals, infidelity, and children born outside of wedlock. The court would meet four times a year during the Ember days, which in Danish are known as tamperdag, hence the court's name.

Previously such cases had been dealt with by the Catholic Church, however responsibility for these cases was moved to the Temper Court following the Reformation. The courts themselves consisted of authorities from the state church and local government.

Tamper courts were found in all parts of the kingdoms, which during this period included Denmark, Norway, Iceland, Greenland, the Faroe Islands, and colonies such as Tranquebar in India.
