= Anders Mus =

Danish bishop, military officer and civil servant (died 1535)

Anders Mus (died 1535) was a Danish bishop, military officer and civil servant in Norway.

He served as a captain in Bergen, Norway from 1501 and for a time was provost in Viborg in Jutland. He came to Oslo in 1506 and served as Bishop of the Diocese of Oslo from 1506 to 1521. He had the support of Erik Valkendorf, who was elected Archbishop of Nidaros in 1510. In 1516 he was also inducted as captain (Norwegian: høvedsmann) at Akershus Fortress. He was additionally made a member of the Norwegian State Council. He died in 1535, probably near Tønsberg.
