= Nidarholm Abbey =

Monastery in Monkholmen, Norway

Coordinates: 63°27′06″N 10°23′00″E

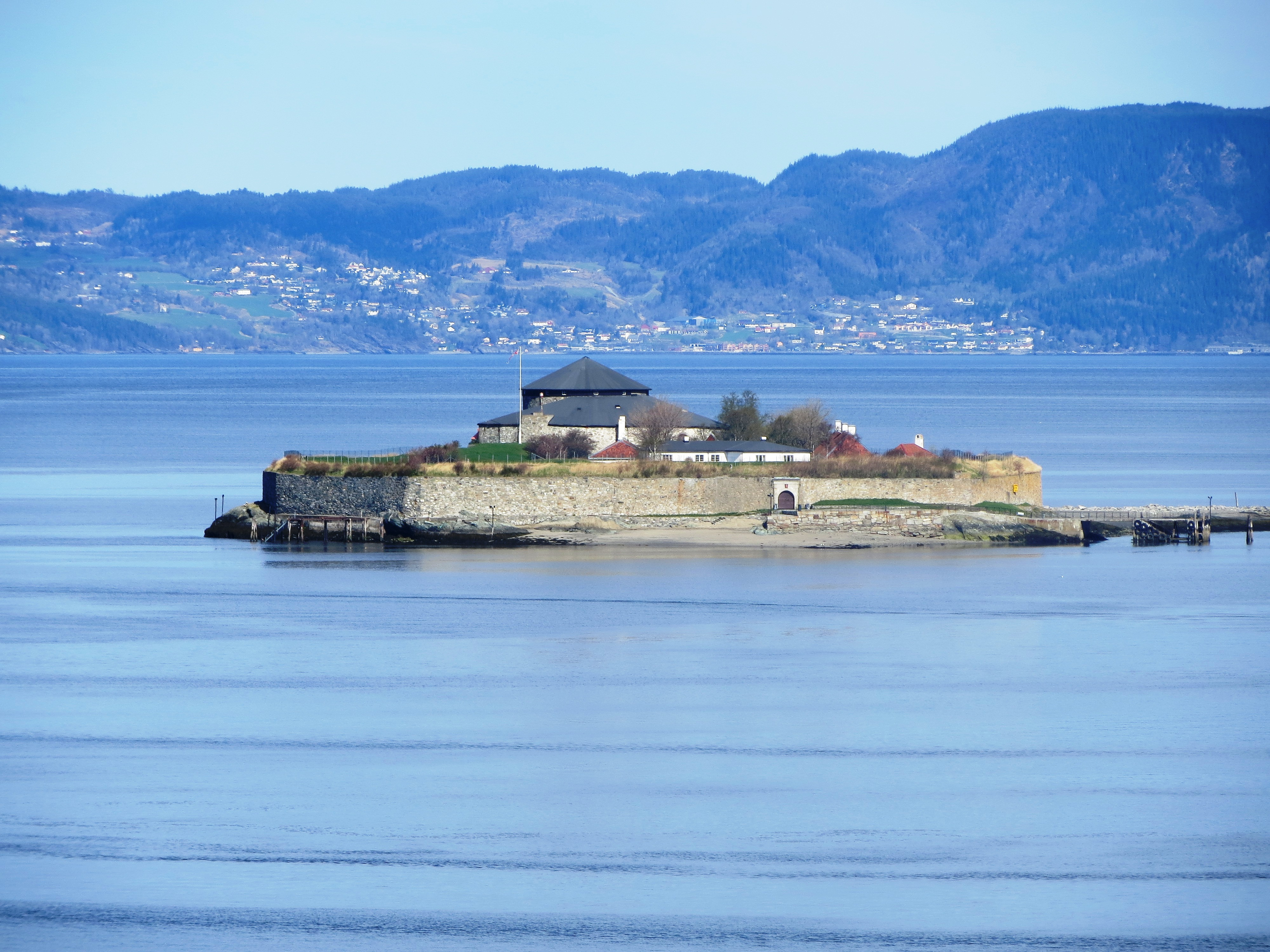
Munkholmen just outside Trondheim, site of the former Nidarholm Abbey

Nidarholm Abbey was a Benedictine monastery located on the island of Munkholmen in Trondheim Fjord on the sea approach to Trondheim, Norway.

== History ==
The monastery was founded either in 1028 by King Canute the Great or in about 1100 by Sigurd Ullstreng (c. 1030 – c. 1100), a vassal of King Magnus Berrføtt. It was dedicated to Saint Benedict and Saint Laurence. The monastery had some connection with the Cluniacs, but it seems that this connection consisted of the introduction of local reforms based on the practices of Cluny, rather than membership of the Cluniac Order and subordination to Cluny as such. The English monk and chronicler Matthew of Paris was asked in 1248, while on a diplomatic mission to King Haakon IV, to supervise a reform of Nidarholm.

The monastery was a powerful and wealthy one, and traded with England, but suffered serious fires in 1210 and 1317, after which it became less prominent. A final fire took place in 1531 shortly before the Reformation. Nidarholm was the last Roman Catholic stronghold in Norway during the Reformation, under Olav Engelbrektsson, Archbishop of Nidaros. His men were besieged in 1537 in Nidarholm by the fleet of Jens Splid (1510–1550), and were eventually forced to surrender.

After 1537 the buildings were abandoned to dereliction, and were used as a quarry for the stone to build the fortresses that later stood on Munkholmen. There are no visible remains of the monastery.

== Other sources ==
- Norges klostre i middelalderen: Nidarholm kloster (in Norwegian)
