= Vincens Lunge =

Danish-Norwegian noble

Vincens Lunge (sporadically referred to as Vincents Lunge; c. 1486 – 3 January 1536) was a Danish-Norwegian noble, member of the Norwegian realm council (Riksråd) and the foremost representative of King Christian III of Denmark in Norway.

== Biography ==
Lunge was born in Denmark in 1486. His parents were Vincens Iversen Dyre til Tirsbæk (died earlier than 1497) and Kirsten Tygesdatter Lunge (died earlier than 1529). He studied at the University of Leuven in Leuven, Brabant. He returned to Denmark in 1518 with a doctoral degree in philosophy and canon law. In 1521 he became a professor of law and rector of the University of Copenhagen.

Vincens Lunge was married to Margrete Nilsdatter (ca. 1495–1565), one of the five daughters of Chancellor and Lord High Steward of Norway Nils Henriksson. Her mother was Ingerd Ottesdatter, a member of the Rømer family of Norway who was one of the wealthiest landowner in Norway. Dating from property disputes, Ingerd Ottesdatter had become an enemy of the Olav Engelbrektsson, the powerful Archbishop of Nidaros.

Early in the reign of King Frederick I of Denmark, Lunge was sent to Northern Norway to enforce the reign of the new king. Lunge acquired Kronstad Hovedgård and the estate Lungegården near Bergen. In 1524, at meeting of the Riksråd, Archbishop Olav Engelbrektsson sponsored requirements to force the newly elected King Frederick I to accept a charter with terms designed to maintain Norway's independence - no foreigners were to be captain of a fortress or lord of a fief, the king was not to impose taxes without the council's consent, the king was not to infringe on the Catholic Church's rights in Norway and the king was to rule Norway only through native-born or married-in Norwegians who resided in Norway. All the king's orders and arrangements were declared invalid until he had signed the coronation charter (Håndfæstning).

In 1533, the election of King Christian III as King of Denmark, triggered the Count's Feud (Grevefeiden), a civil war that raged from 1534–1536 pitting Roman Catholic forces against the Protestant Reformation movement within Denmark and Norway. The relationship with Archbishop Olav Engelbrektsson gradually worsened. This resulted in numerous conflicts between them, which included as well as Ingerd Ottesdatter. In 1535, Lunge traveled to Trondheim to negotiate peace in the conflict and to make the northern branch of the Riksråd to accept and elect Christian III as King of Norway. During January 1536, Lunge was murdered by the allies of Archbishop Engelbrektsson. As described in the Diplomatarium Norvegicum, the actual murder of the earl was said to have taken place at the hands of Archbishop Engelbrektsson's cousin, Kristoffer Trondson. Admiral Trondson was head of a fleet which had been in conflict with Danish vessels.

== Legacy ==
This dramatic events surrounding the death of Vincens Lunge are memorialized today in an annual opera sponsored by the Norwegian Ministry of Culture, titled Olav Engelbrektsson, which takes place at Steinvikholm Castle outside of Trondheim.

In Bergen today, many landmarks are still associated with Vincens Lunge. From the name of his estate Lungegården, two well known lakes in Bergen go by the name Lille Lungegårdsvannet and Store Lungegårdsvannet. In addition a small street in Bergen is named Vincens Lunges Gate.

== See also ==
- Henrich Krummedige

== Other sources ==
- Bull, Edvard (1917). Vincens Lunge (in Norwegian). Kristiania: Steenske forlag.
- Koht, Halvdan (1950). Vincens Lunge contra Henrik Krummedige: 1523-1525 (in Norwegian). Oslo: Aschehoug.
- Rian, Øystein (2003). "Hvordan den dansk-dominerte kongemakten seiret". Maktens historie i dansketiden (in Norwegian). Oslo: Makt- og demokratiutredningen.
