= Munkeliv Abbey =

Benedictine abbey in Nordnes, Bergen, Norway

Coordinates: 60°23′42″N 5°18′54″E

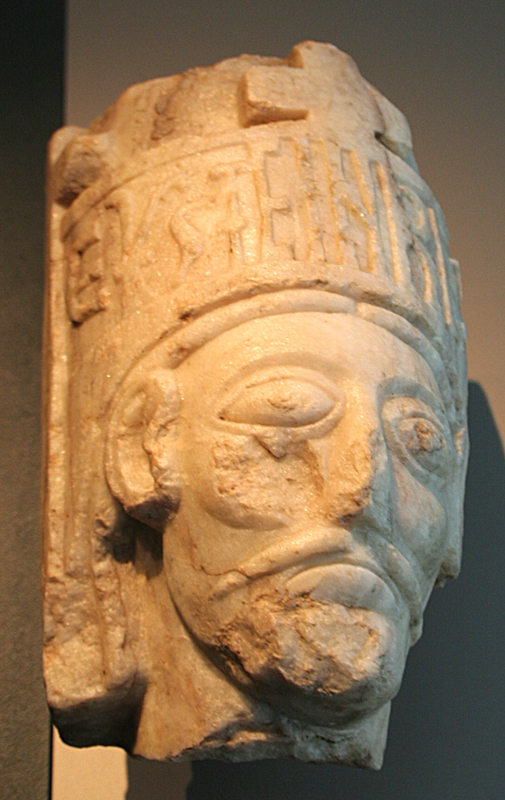
King Eystein I: marble portrait head originally from Munkeliv Abbey

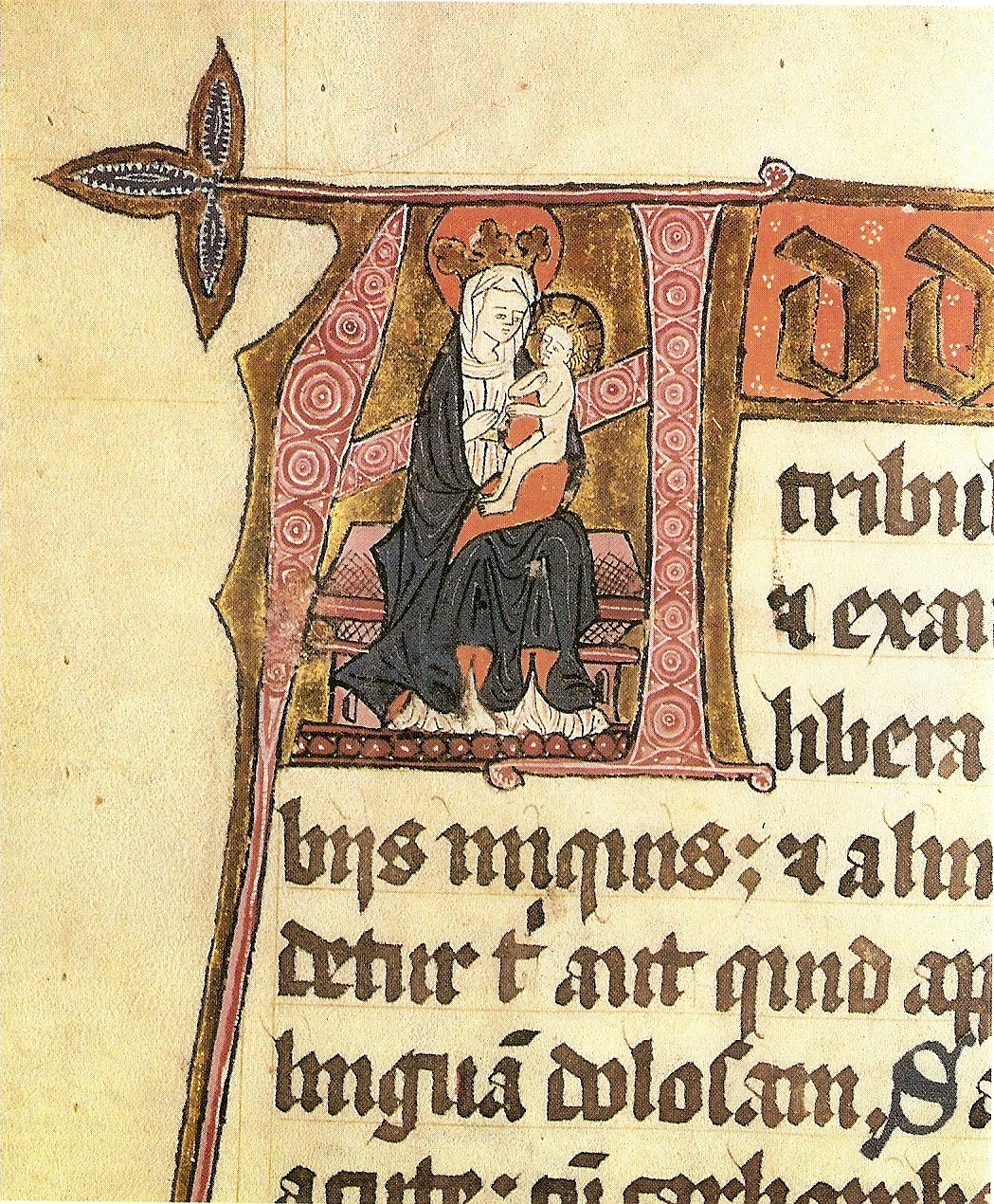
Birgitta Sigfusdatter: Madonna with child (Munkeliv, ca. 1450)

Munkeliv Abbey (Norwegian: Munkeliv kloster) was a Benedictine abbey located at Nordnes in Bergen, Norway. It was one of the oldest monasteries in Norway, and also one of the wealthiest and best-documented. There are no visible remains today.

== History ==
Munkeliv Abbey was founded as a Benedictine abbey by King Eystein I of Norway (Øystein 1 Magnusson, reigned 1103– 1123) in about 1110 and was dedicated to Saint Michael. The abbey was strategically positioned on the dominant height of Nordnes over the then newly established town of Bergen, with a view to encouraging the town's development. Its first centuries were successful and prosperous, but the arrival of the Black Death in the mid-14th century brought about a decline. In addition, the buildings suffered great damage in 1393 when the abbey was attacked by pirates known as the Victual Brothers (vitaliebrødrene). Thanks to its great wealth it managed to survive these catastrophes, but could not avoid a further decline.

In the 1420s it was taken over by the Bridgettines, with the Pope's approval, and was occupied as a double house by both monks and nuns. This was a very disturbed period: the abbey was again damaged by fire in 1455, when it was attacked by Hanseatic merchants pursuing Olav Nilsson, commander of the royal castle in Bergen, who had sought sanctuary in the abbey. Both Olav Nilsson and Leif Thor Olafsson, Bishop of Bergen, died during the attack. During the 1460s, the occupants of Munkeliv were obliged to seek shelter in Hovedøya Abbey in Oslo. The monastery was re-constructed by the Cistercian Order and reoccupied by the Bridgettines in 1480.

When the abbey was suppressed during the Protestant Reformation, the Bishop of Bergen took it over for his residence and used the church as the cathedral of Bergen. The entire building complex however was destroyed by fire in 1536. The monks' herb garden near Puddefjord was later cultivated by the Bergen pharmacist, Løveapoteket, for medicinal plants, until the surrounding areas were built up in the 19th century.

== Site and buildings ==
The monastery remains today are beneath the open space known as "the Monastery" (Klosteret) at Nordnes, near numbers 2–6, and nothing is visible. Excavations of the site took place in 1857 and 1860, during which many extremely well crafted structural fragments were recovered. These artifacts are now in the Museum of Cultural History (Kulturhistorisk Museum), part of Bergen Museum. These include the well-known marble head of King Eystein I discovered by Nicolay Nicolaysen, supposedly the oldest-known portrait of a Norwegian. At that time there were still remains of walls above ground up to a height of roughly 2.4 metres, but these were demolished after the excavations.

The church was approximately 32 metres in length and 11 metres wide, consisting of a single aisle the same width as the choir, which ended in an apse at the east end and also a crypt. A west tower was added in the 13th century. The conventual buildings were to the south of the church. Presumably under the Bridgettines, who carried out extensive building alterations, the cloisters were incorporated into the church.

== Other sources ==
- Gullbekk, Svein H. (2009) Pengevesenets fremvekst og fall i Norge i middelalderen (Copenhagen: Museum Tusculanum Press) ISBN 9788763505710
- Lidén, Hans-Emil, and Magerøy, Ellen Maria (1980) Norges kirker, Bergen (Oslo: Gyldendal, vol I, pp 150–57) ISBN 82-05-12367-5
- Øye, Ingvild (ed.) (1994) Bergen and the German Hansa (Bergen: Bryggens Museum) ISBN 82-90289-52-9
