= Catholic Diocese of Bergen =

Roman Catholic diocese in Norway (11 c. - 1537)

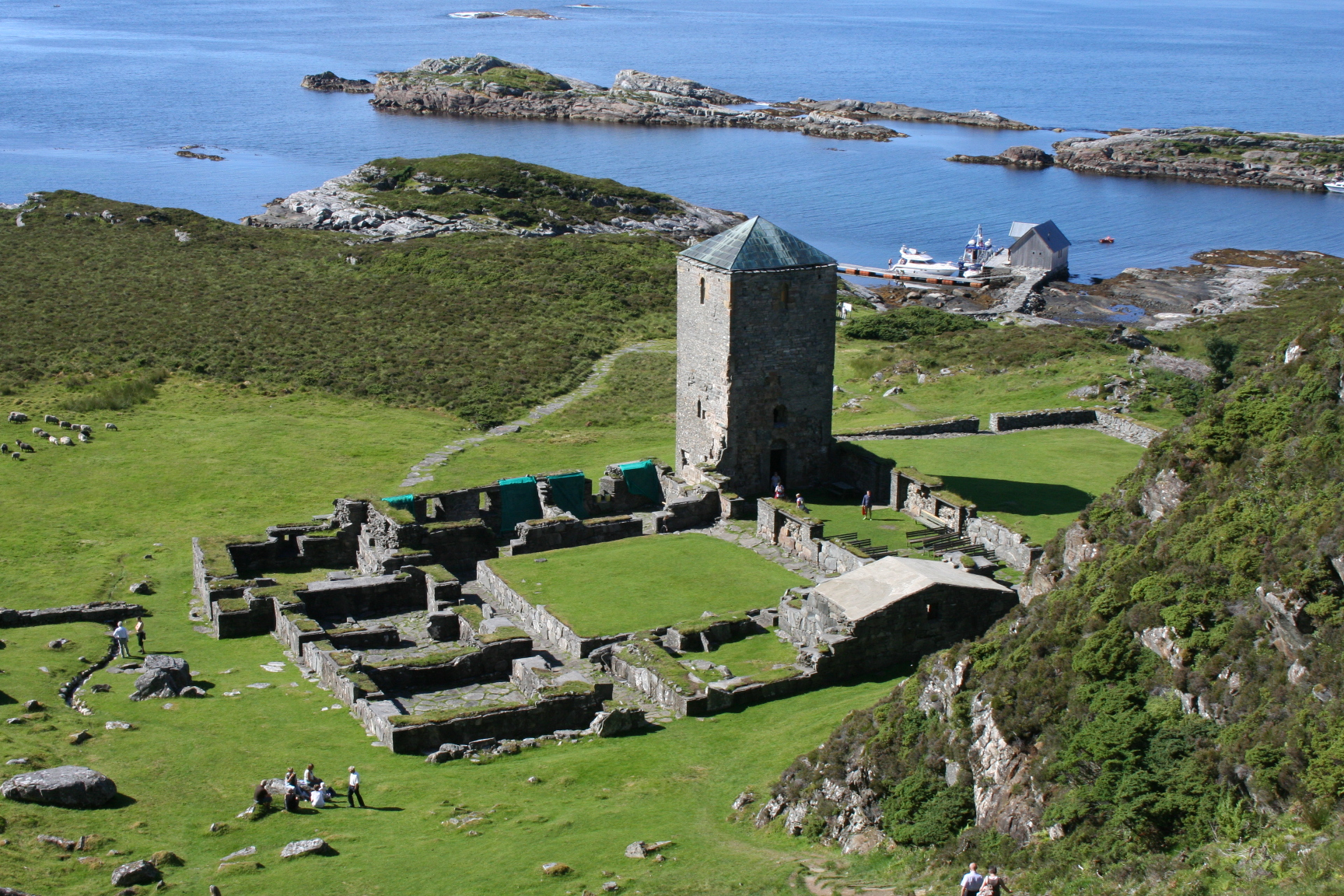
Ruins of Selje Abbey

The Catholic Diocese of Bergen or Diocese of Bjørgvin in Norway existed from the eleventh century to the Protestant Reformation (1537), and included the (modern) Vestland county (with exception of the parishes Eidfjord and Røldal).

Originally (from 1068) the diocese served all the area of Gulating: the modern counties of Vestland, Rogaland, and Agder — and the regions of Sunnmøre, Valdres and Hallingdal.

When the Diocese of Stavanger was established, around 1125, the counties of Rogaland, Aust-Agder and Vest-Agder were transferred to the new diocese — together with the regions of Valdres and Hallingdal (and the parishes of Eidfjord and Røldal from Hordaland).

The region Sunnmøre was transferred to the Archdiocese of Nidaros some time after 1152 — to secure more income for the Archdiocese.

== History ==
The discovery at Selja in 996 of the supposed remains of St. Sunniva and her companions led King Olaf Tryggvason to build a church there. It was not, however, till 1068 that a bishopric and a monastery were founded at Selja by King Olaf Kyrre. Bernard the Saxon was the first bishop, but he later removed to the newly founded city of Bergen, where he died as its first bishop about 1090.

The diocese was originally a suffragan of the archdiocese of Hamburg-Bremen, from 1104 on of that of Lund. In 1152 Bergen became a suffragan of the new metropolitan See of Trondhjem, and a cathedral chapter was set up there. Bishop Paul (1156 – 1194) saw the completion of the Cathedral of Christ Church in time for the holding of a provincial council there and for the coronation of King Magnus Erlingsson, the first coronation of a Norwegian king, in 1164. In 1170 the relics of St. Sunniva were translated to the cathedral. During the episcopate of Bishop Arne (1226 – 1256), on 29 July 1247, Cardinal Wilhelm of Sabina crowned King Haakon Haakonsson. In 1271 the Royal Chapel of the Holy Apostles at Bergen was made collegiate.

In 1275 Magnus VI of Norway founded a great church, as his new royal chapel at Bergen, to receive a relic of the Crown of Thorns. The dean took the title of Master of the (fourteen) Royal Chapels and was granted the right to use the episcopal ornaments. Bishop Arne Sigurdssön (1305 – 1314) regarded the privileges of the Chapel Royal at Bergen as an encroachment upon the rights of his see. He could not, however, deprive the dean, Finn Haldorssön, of his semi-independent position, as the latter had the support of the Holy See. Arne also asserted in vain his claim that the bishop of the Faroe Islands should be chosen amongst the clergy of the Diocese of Bergen. He was, however, successful in compelling the German merchants at Bergen to pay tithe.

Bishop Thorstein (1342 – 1349) died of the Black Death, as did nearly all the Norwegian bishops. His successor, the Englishman Gisbrith (1349 – 1369), wrote the Bergen Manuscript (Björgynjar kálfskinn). Aslak Bolt, Bishop of Bergen from 1408, was translated to the See of Trondhjem in 1430. Bishop Thorleif Olafssön (1430 – 1450), having joined Olaf Nilssön at the Brigittine Convent of Munkalif, was killed there by the Germans of the Hansa on 1 September 1455. The last Catholic bishop, Olav Torkelsson (1523 – 1535) allowed the Cathedral of Christ Church, the Royal Chapel of the Apostles, the Dominican convent, and other ecclesiastical buildings in Bergen to be destroyed, when the fortress of the Bergenhus was enlarged. His successor, Geble Pederssön, became a Lutheran.

The Abbey of St. Michael's, Munkalif (Benedictine monks, 1108 – 1426; Brigittines, 1426 – 1470 and 1479 – 1531; Cistercian nuns, 1470 – 1479), lay close to Bergen. The city and its suburbs contained in all 26 churches. Elsewhere there were the Cistercian Abbey of Lyse, colonized from Fountains Abbey, Yorkshire, in 1146, and the Hospital of the Holy Spirit at Halsnøy Abbey (about 1200 – 1539).

In 1537 the new Lutheran Diocese of Bjørgvin was founded as legal heir of the ancient Diocese.

== Councils at Bergen ==
Eighteen provincial councils were held at Bergen. The most important were the following:

- The council of 1164 confirmed arrangements made in 1152 by the legate Cardinal Nicholas Breakspear (afterwards Pope Adrian IV), with regard to the Norwegian Church. Their object was the establishment of the hierarchy by the following means: (1) the establishment on a firm basis of the Archbishopric of Trondhjem; (2) the foundation of cathedral chapters; (3) the assertion of the right of the Church to inherit property by will; (4) the enforcement of clerical celibacy.
- The council of 1190 decreed the excommunication of all of guilty sacrilege, violence towards clerks, rape, or of unlawful bearing arms in church and at public assemblies. King Sverre's Christian Law ( Christenret ) was published at this council.
- The council held in 1273 decided that parish churches in Iceland should belong to the bishop of the diocese and not to the landowners. A number of articles were also framed with a view to a reconciliation between Church and State, but they were never accepted either by pope or king.
- In 1280 many rules with regard to excommunication were made but not carried into effect, as the quarrel between Church and State broke out with renewed violence.
- At the council of 1320 a large number of regulations were made with regard to discipline. In 1327 the canons adopted at the provincial synod dealt with the relations between Church and State.

The last provincial synod at Bergen was held in 1435. It dealt with the collection of money for the maintenance of the Council of Basle, the superstitious observance of Saturday, which was forbidden, and unauthorized begging on the part of religious.

== The Bishops of Bergen before the Reformation ==
- Before 1067 : Bjarnvard (Bernard the Saxon) since 1067, Bishop of Selja
- : Svein, Bishop of Selja
- (1115), (1128) : Magnus, Bishop of Selja
- (1135) : Ottar Islänning, Bishop of Selja
- 1156/57–1160 : Paal, Bishop of Selja
- 1160 – 1194 : Nikolas Petersson of Sogn, Bishop of Selja, Bishop of Bergen after 1170
- 1194 – 1216 : Martin
- 1217 – 1224 : Haavard
- 1226 – 1256 : Arne
- 1257 – 1270 : Peter
- 1270 – 1277 : Askatin
- 1278 – 1304 : Narve, O.P.
- 1305 – 1314 : Arne Sigurdsson
- 1314 – 1330 : Audfinn Sigurdsson
- 1336 – 1336 : Johannes
- 1332 – 1342 : Haakon Erlingsson
- 1343 – 1349 : Torstein Eiriksson
- 1349 – 1369 : Gisbrikt Erlendsson
- 1370 – 1371 : Benedikt Ringstad, O.P.
- 1372 – 1401 : Jakob Jensson, O.P.
- 1401 – 1407 : Jakob Knutsson
- 1408 – 1428 : Aslak Hartviktsson Bolt, Archbishop of Nidaros since 1428
- 1430/31–1434 : Arendt Klementssøn, Archbishop of Uppsala 1433 – 1434 (not consecrated)
- 1434 – 1436 : Olav Nilsson
- 1438/40–1448 : Olav Niklasson
- 1450 – 1455 : Leif Thor Olafsson (Thorleiv Olavsson)
- 1457 – 1460 : Paulus Justiniani
- 1461 – 1474 : Finnboge Niklasson
- 1474 – 1506 : Hans Teiste
- 1507 – 1522 : Andor Ketilsson
- 1524 – 1535 : Olav Torkelsson
