= Inger Ottesdotter Rømer =

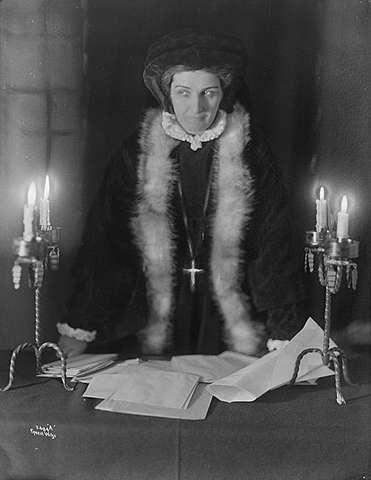
Lady Inger, as portrayed by the Norwegian actress Agnes Mowinckel in 1921.

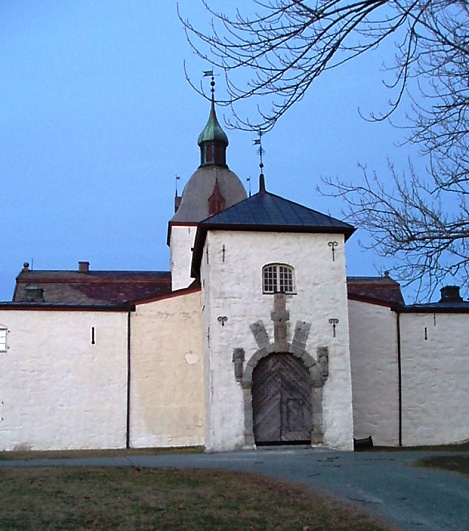
Manor of Austrått built 1656 in Ørland, Norway

Ingerd Ottesdotter (Rømer) (c. 1475–1555) was her era's wealthiest landowner in Norway. She was the ultimate heiress of the noble Rømer family and a political intriguer. Lady Ingerd is noted for having orchestrated her powerful sons-in-law to support her goals. Her fame was the inspiration for Henrik Ibsen's play Lady Inger of Ostrat.

== Life ==
She was the daughter of Otte Matsson Rømer (1437-1508) and Ingeborg Lydersdatter Struds von Bergen (c. 1451–1512). Lady Ingerd's parents had her marry Lord Nils Henriksson, whose family also had some claim to Austrått Manor in the Trondheimsfjord. Thus the important manor of Austrått, with its associated lands, were settled to be Ingerd's share of the family inheritance. Her husband became both Chancellor and High Steward of Norway (rikshovmester). She was widowed in 1523.

Her interests also targeted Swedish politics, in addition to Norwegian. In 1526 she received the exiled Swedish chancellor Peder Sunnanväder, who had been implicated in the Dalecarlian rebellions. Later she practically joined attempts to dethrone King Gustav I of Sweden. In 1528 the knight who claimed to be Nils Sture, the elder son of Sten Sture the Younger, the 1512–20 Regent of Sweden (the boy's identity remains controversial to this day: he may have been the authentic Nils or was an impostor), fled to Norway after his defeat and enjoyed the hospitality of Lady Ingerd. She had plans to obtain the crown of Sweden for him, taking it from the Stures' kinsman King Gustav Vasa. And, more importantly to her, she was planning to marry his daughter, Eline Nilsdatter to the young pretender and make her the Queen. Ultimately, nothing came of this and the so-called Daljunkern was executed later in Rostock at request of King Gustav.

From earlier property disputes and such, Lady Ingerd was an enemy of the Roman Catholic prelate Olav Engelbrektsson, Primate of Norway and Archbishop of Nidaros. Archbishop Engelbriktsonn was also a rival in Norway's government with Lady Ingerd's son-in-law Lord Vincens Lunge. Lady Inger and her family joined the Lutheran Reformation and promoted it extensively. That served as an important impetus for Protestantism in Norway.

== Personal life ==
Ingerd Ottesdotter Rømer and Nils Henriksson had five daughters, all of whom married Danish-Norwegian noblemen:

- Margrete Nilsdatter (c. 1495–1550), married to Vincens Lunge, nobleman and member of the Norwegian national council (Riksråd)
- Eline Nilsdatter (c. 1504–1532), married with Nils Lykke, feudal lord at Sunnmøre and Nordmøre
- Anna Nilsdatter (c 1505–1557), married to Erik Ugerup, feudal lord in Tønsberg
- Ingeborg Nilsdatter (c. 1512–1597), married to Peder Hanssøn Litle, feudal lord of Akershus
- Lucie Nilsdatter (d. 1555), married Jens Tillufssøn Bjelke, feudal lord of Jemtland

Lucie Nilsdatter had been the center of a social scandal of some substance in those times. Nils Lykke had married Eline Nilsdatter, the elder sister of Lucie. After her sister Eline's death in 1532, Lucie cared for Eline's children and ultimately conceived a child by Nils Lykke. Nils was subsequently put to death for incest by Archbishop Engelbrektsson in 1535. Lucie married Jens Tillufssøn Bjelke in 1540, and his correspondence thereafter came from Austrått Manor. Lady Ingerd formally transferred the title of Austrått to Lucie and Jens; records show that the transfer was confirmed by the king in 1552. There has been speculation that Lucie's scandal allowed Jens, who descended from lesser nobility, to be considered socially acceptable for Lucie. In 1555 she and her daughter Lucie Jensdatter died in a shipwrecking off the coast of North-Western Norway.

== Later fame ==
In 1857, playwright Henrik Ibsen, then in his early career, wrote the play "Lady Inger of Ostrat" which loosely utilizes her intrigues towards Swedish throne as basis of drama. The play is not fully accurate on historical and genealogical details.
