= Absalon Pederssøn Beyer =

Norwegian author, lecturer and clergyman

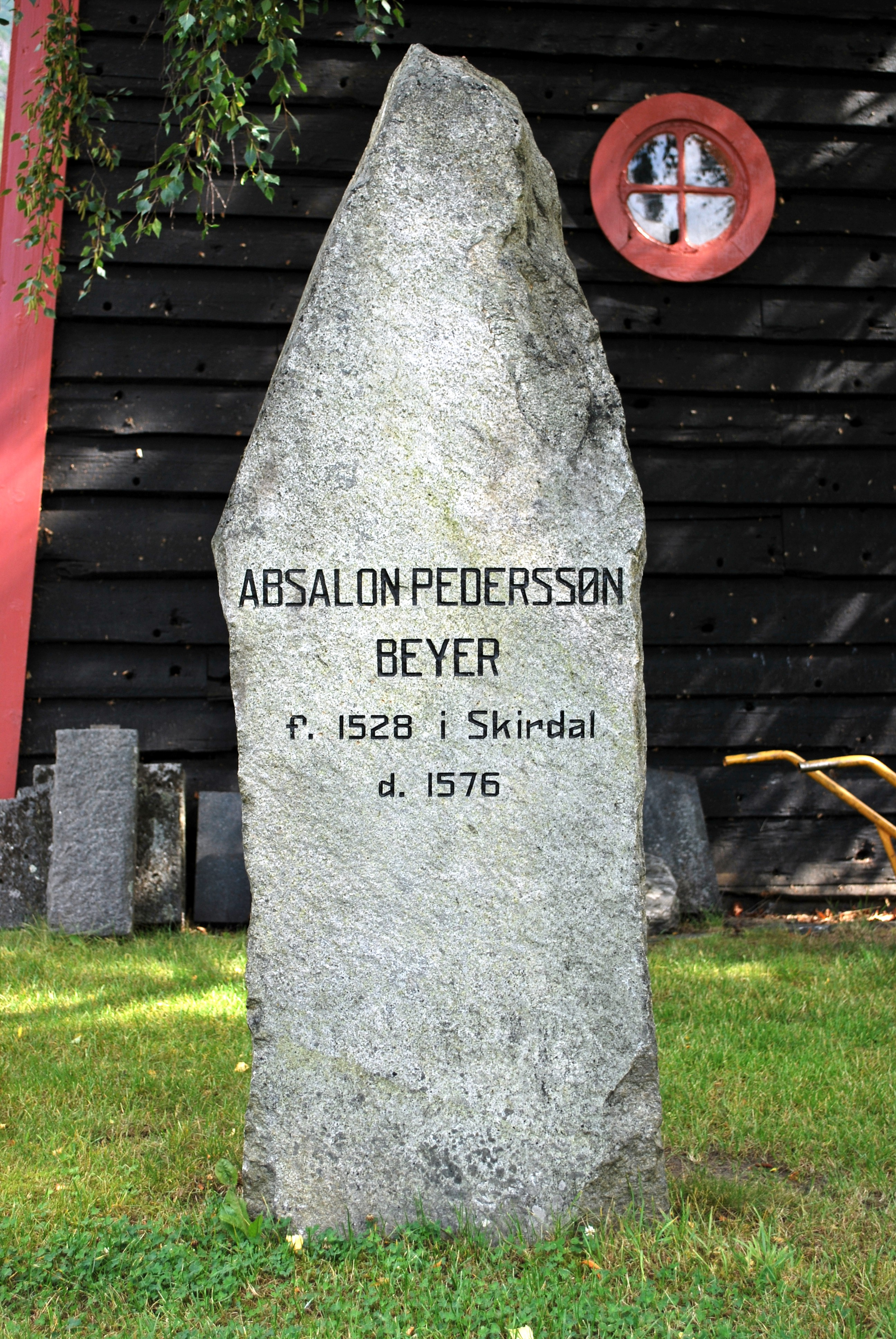
Memorial stone at Vangen Church in Aurland

Absalon Pederssøn Beyer (c. 1528 – 9 April 1575) was a Norwegian author, lecturer and Lutheran clergyman. Beyer contributed greatly to the spiritual Reformation in Norway. He is best known today for his diary or annal of contemporary events. Absalon Pederssøns dagbok 1552–1572, his diary from the years between 1552 and 1572 is one of the most important source of the information of the cultural and social history of Bergen during this period.

Absalon Pederssøn Beyer was born in Ramsvik, Aurland, in the county of Vestland, Norway. He received his education in Copenhagen. In 1549, he went to Wittenberg, where he studied for 2 years with Philip Melanchthon, one of the leaders of the Protestant Reformation. In 1553, Beyer was appointed lecturer in theology at the Bergen Cathedral School. Between 1557 and 1564 he was also the school's head teacher or reading teacher. From 1566 he was also a priest at Bergenhus.

Beyer had a working knowledge of both the Greek and Latin languages. In 1566, he let his students perform The Fall of Adam in church. This is thought to be the first public theatrical performance in Norway. Beyer wrote historic-topographic works including Om Norigs Rige and Bergens kapitelsbok. He died in 1575. His widow, Anne Pedersdotter, was accused of witchcraft and was burned in 1590 even though loyal clergymen asserted her innocence.

== Other sources ==
- Bang, Anton Christian (1883) Den norske kirkes historie (Oslo: Cammermeyer)
- Bang, Anton Christian (1884) Gjengangere Fra Hedenskabet Og Katholicismen Blandt Vort Folk Efter Reformationen (Oslo: Cammermeyer)
- Wiers-Jenssen, Hans (1917) Anne Pedersdotter; a drama in four acts (Boston: Little, Brown, and Co.)
