= Nils Henriksson =

Norwegian knight and landowner

Nils Henriksson (or Niels Henrikssøn, circa 1455–1523) was a Norwegian knight, landowner, National Counselor and Lord High Steward of Norway who married Ingerd Ottesdatter (fru Inger til Austrått).

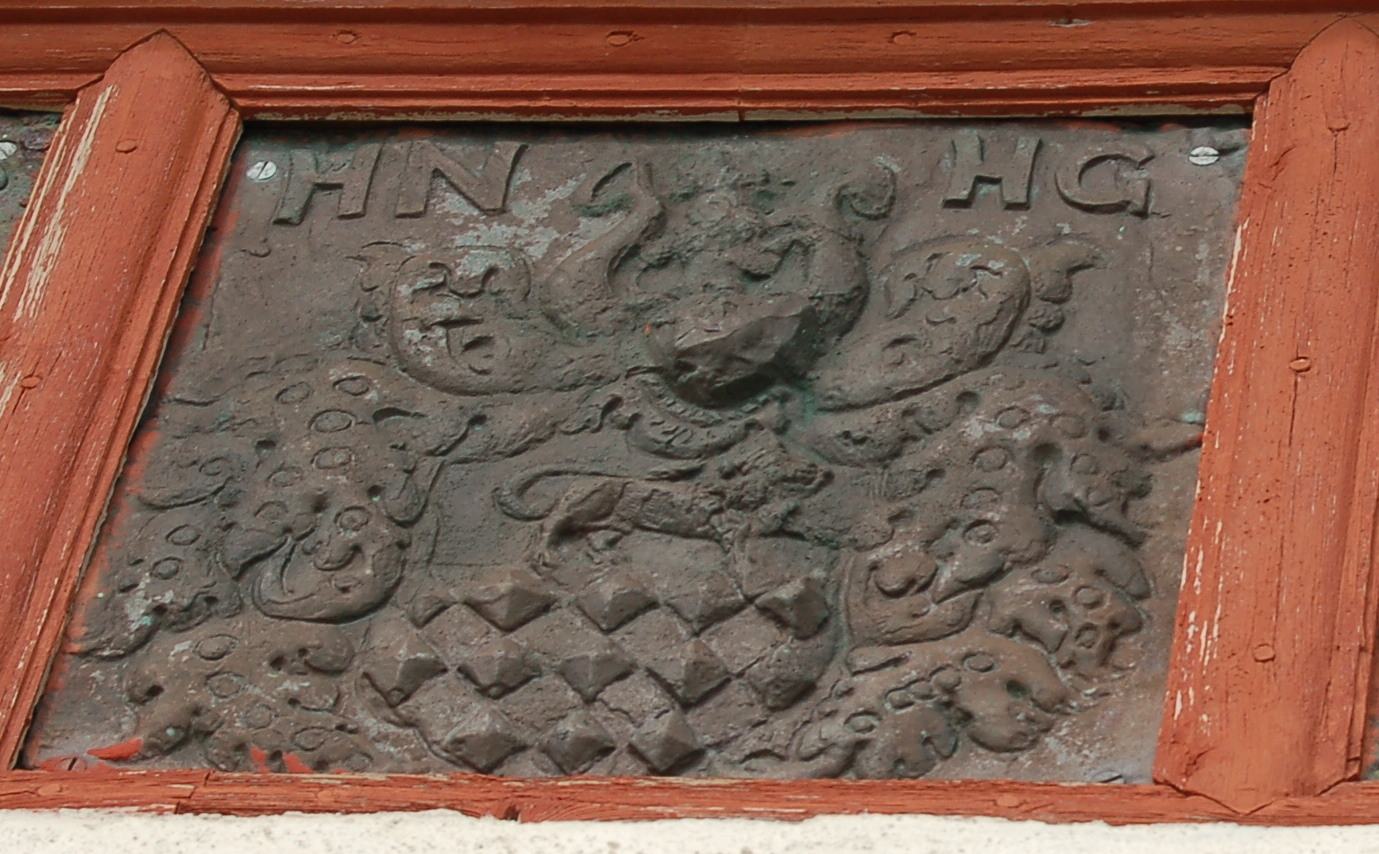
Herr Nils Henriksson Gyldenløve's coat of arms (note the initials H N H G above the lion)

He was the son of National Counselor Henrik Jensson (ca 1415–1477) and Elin Nilsdatter (or Nikolasdatter), and through the marriage with Ingerd he consolidated his possession of the Austrått estates. He was one of Norway's largest landowners, with properties in Bergen, Vardøhus, Hålogaland, Fosen, Frosta, Stjørdal, Sunnmøre, Romsdal, Edøy, Selbu, and Herjedalen.

He probably became National Counselor as early as 1483 and held a central role with the Norwegian national government until his death, but apparently had no clear political agenda on his own behalf. The title Lord High Steward of Norway which he held in 1514–1515 was most probably an honorary title that was awarded for the trip during the summer of 1515, when he played a role in the delegation that retrieved Christian II's future wife Isabella of Burgundy (1501–1526).

Prior to his marriage with Ingerd, he had a son Henrik Nielssøn (1500–1567), who was a magistrate and ecclesiastical cannon. Together with Ingerd, Nils had five daughters. The latest members of the family used the name Gyldenløve, based on his arms: a golden lion on a checkered field. It is not known whether Nils himself used this surname. He is in modern times sometimes, retroactively, referred to as ‘Nils Henriksson (Gyldenløve)’.
