= List of castles in Norway =

There are many castles and palaces in Norway. The Norwegian word slott means castle, palass means palace, and fort or festning means fortress. To see list of fortresses in Norway, see List of Norwegian fortresses. In Norway, there tend to be many more manor houses compared to castles.

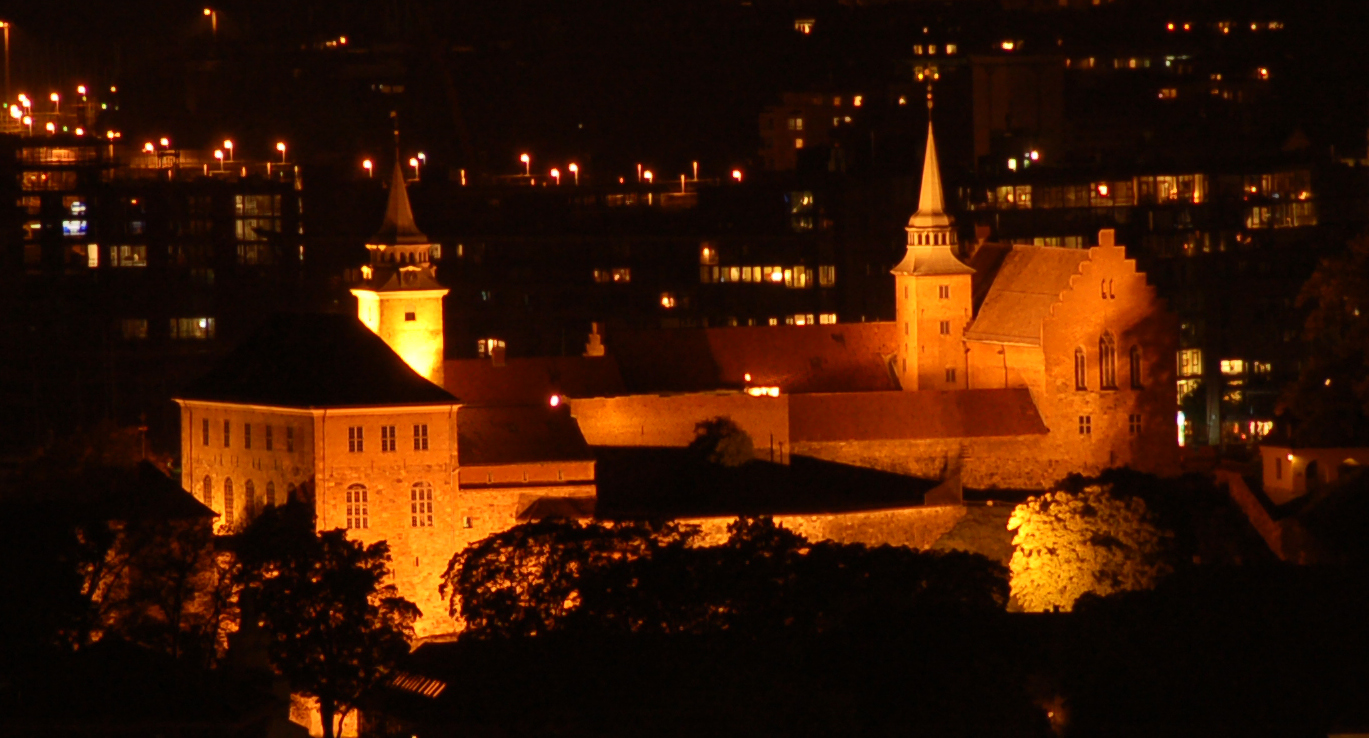
Akershus Castle by night

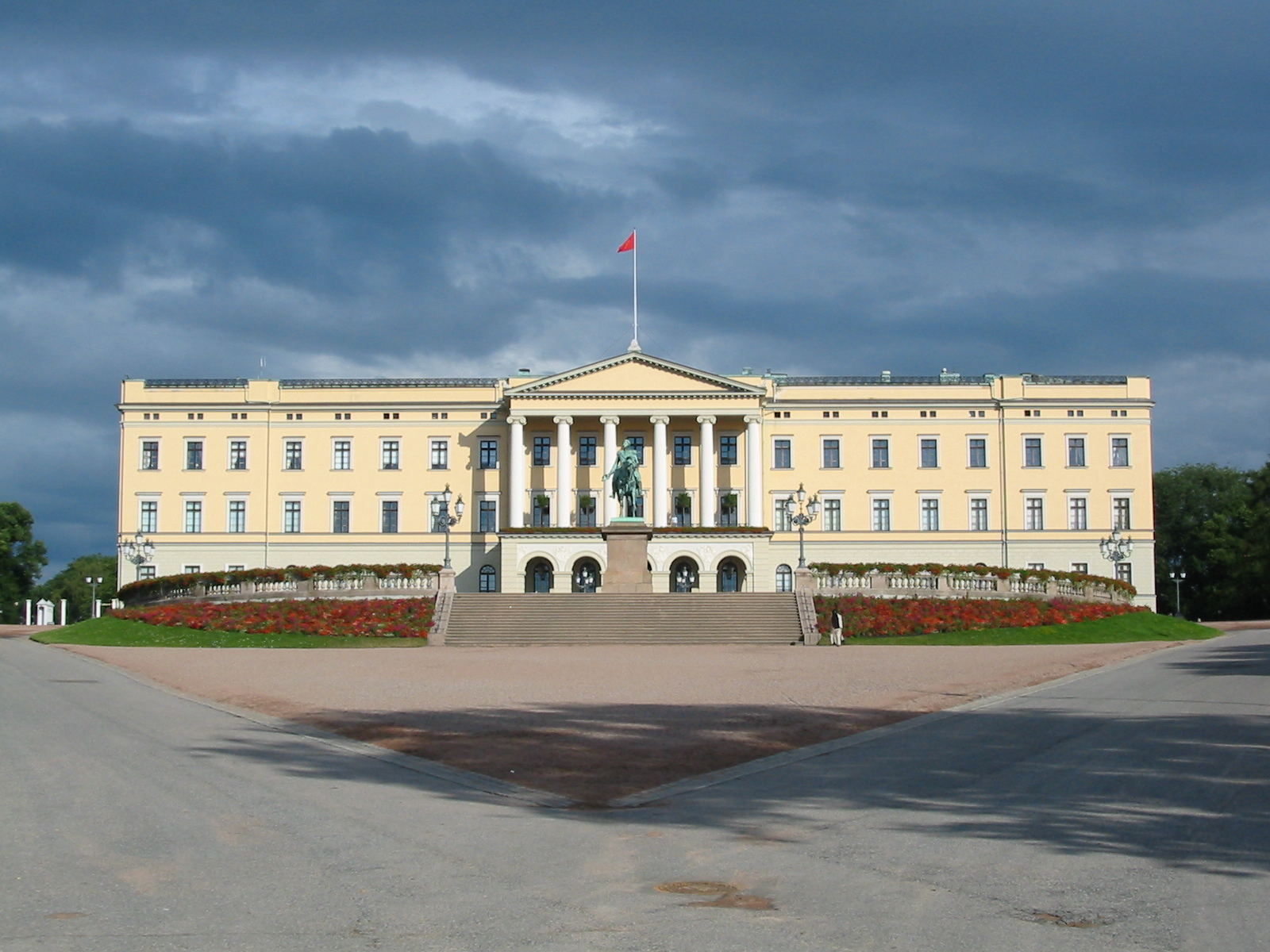
Royal Palace, Oslo

== Medieval castles and ruins ==
These are castle ruins from the medieval Kingdom of Norway.

Name	Place	State	Ref.
Akershus Castle	Oslo	Castle and fortress	
Audunborg	Ålhus village	Ruin	
Avaldsnes Kongsgård	Karmøy island	Ruin	
Bergenhus	City of Bergen	Castle and fortress	
Broberg Castle	Lysekil Municipality (now in Sweden)	Ruin	
Båhus	Konghelle village (now in Sweden)	Castle and fortress and partly ruin	
Dyngehus	Town of Uddevalla (now in Sweden)	Ruin	
Hamarhus	Town of Hamar	Castle and fortress and partly ruin	
Isegran	Town of Fredrikstad	Built in to a fortress	
Konghelle Kastell	Konghelle village (now in Sweden)	Ruin	
Mjøskastellet	Ringsaker Municipality	Ruin	
Olsborg	Tanum Municipality (now in Sweden)	Ruin	
Oslo kongsgård Kastell	Oslo	Ruin	
Oslo Old Bishop's Palace	Oslo	Ruin	
Peel Castle	Peel, Isle of Man	Castle and partly ruin	
Ragnhildsholmen	Hisingen island	Ruin	
Stavanger Bishop's Palace	Stavanger	Ruin	
Steinvikholm Castle	Stjørdal Municipality	Castle and fortress and partly ruin	
Sverresborg	City of Bergen	Build in to a fortress	
Sverresborg	City of Trondheim	Ruin	
Tunsberghus	City of Tønsberg	Ruin	
Trondheim Archbishop's Palace	City of Trondheim	Palace	
Valdisholmborg	Indre Østfold Municipality	Ruin	
Valkaberg	Oslo		
Vardøhus	Town of Vardø	Build in to a fortress	

== Castles ==
Name	Place	State	Architect	Built by	Ref.
Austrått	Ørland Municipality			Ove Bjelke	
Egeberg Castle	Oslo Municipality		Halfdan Berle	Westye Egeberg	
Fresjeborgen	Larvik Municipality	Destroyed		Iver Jenssøn	
Fritzøehus	Larvik Municipality		Jacob Wilhelm Nordan	Michael Treschow	
Gamlehaugen	Bergen Municipality		Jens Zetlitz Monrad Kielland	Christian Michelsen	
Oscarshall palace	Oslo Municipality		Johan Henrik Nebelong	Oscar I	
Barony Rosendal	Kvinnherad Municipality			Ludvig Rosenkrantz	
Royal Palace	Oslo Municipality		Hans Ditlev Franciscus von Linstow	Charles III John	

== Manors and Mansions ==
These are manor houses (Norwegian: Herregård or Setegård) and mansions (Norwegian: Lystgård)

Name	Place	Architect	First owner	Ref.
Alby	Moss Municipality			
Alvøen Mansion	Bergen Municipality		Fasmer	
Ask estate	Ringerike Municipality	Johan Georg Boll Gram	Johan Georg Boll Gram	
Atlungstad Mansion	Stange Municipality	Herman Major Backer	Carl Gustav Wedel Jarlsberg	
Austad Manor	Drammen Municipality		Peder Juel von Cappelen	
Berby Manor	Halden Municipality		Ole Bjørnstad	
Boen Mansion	Kristiansand Municipality		Daniel Isaachsen	
Bogstad Manor	Oslo Municipality		Morten Leuch	
Borgestad Manor	Skien Municipality		Johan von Arnold	
Borregaard Manor	Sarpsborg Municipality		Jens Werenskiold	
Buskerud Manor	Modum Municipality			
Bygdøy Royal Estate	Oslo Municipality		Oscar II	
Bærums Verk	Bærum Municipality	Johan Henrik Nebelong	Baron Harald Wedel Jarlsberg	
Christinegård	Bergen Municipality		Modesta Hansdatter Formann	
Damsgård Manor	Bergen		Joachim Christian Geelmuyden Gyldenkrantz	
Dønnes Manor	Dønna Municipality		Isach Jørgen Coldevin	
Eidsfos Manor	Eidsfoss village			
Eidsvoll Verk	Eidsvoll Municipality	Carl Frederik Ferdinand Stanley	Carsten Tank Anker	
Elingård Manor	Fredrikstad Municipality		Jens Bjelke	
Falkensten Manor	Horten Municipality		Anders Pedersen Styhr	
Fjøsanger Mansion	Bergen Municipality		Danckert Krohn	
Folkenborg	Town of Mysen		Folkenborg Museum	
Fornebu	Oslo Municipality			
Fossesholm	Øvre Eiker Municipality			
Fossum Manor	Skien Municipality	Christian Collett	Severin Løvenskiold	
Fossum Manor	Modum Municipality		Det Kongelige Modumske Blaafarveværk	
Frekhaug Manor	Alver Municipality		Cort Abrahamsen Holtermann	
Frogner Manor	Oslo Municipality			
Frogner Manor	Skien Municipality		Christopher Hansen Blom	
Frønningen	Lærdal Municipality		Bjarnhard Rumohr	
Gimle	Kristiansand Municipality		Bernt Holm	
Gjemsø Abbey	Skien Municipality			
Gjøvik gård	Gjøvik Municipality			
Grefsheim Manor	Ringsaker Municipality			
Grimsrød	Moss Municipality			
Gulskogen	Drammen Municipality			
Gaarder	Elverum Municipality			
Hafslund Manor	Sarpsborg Municipality		Peter Elieson	
Halsnøy Abbey	Kvinnherad Municipality			
Herregården Manor	Larvik Municipality		Ulrik Frederik Gyldenløve	
Holden Manor	Village of Ulefoss			
Holleby Manor	Sarpsborg Municipality			
Hovinsholm Manor				
Hverven	Stange Municipality		Ole Olsen Bolstad	
Jarlsberg Manor	Tønsberg Municipality		Baron Gustav Wilhelm von Wedel	
Kaupanger Manor	Sogndal Municipality		Knagenhjelm	
Kjellestad	Bamble Municipality		Blehr	
Kjos Manor	Kristiansand Municipality		Daniel Isaachsen	
Kjørbo	Bærum Municipality	C.H. Grosch		
Kronstad Manor	Bergen Municipality	Ole Peter Riis Høegh	Joachim Friele	
Lade Manor	City of Trondheim		Hilmar Meinche	
Leangen Manor	Trondheim Municipality			
Ledaal	Stavanger Municipality	Fredrich Otto Scheel	Gabriel Schanche Kielland	
Lerchendal Mansion	Trondheim Municipality		Christian Lerche	
Linderud	Oslo Municipality		Erich Mogensøn	
Losby	Lørenskog Municipality		Meyer	
Lyse Abbey	Bjørnafjorden Municipality		Formann	
Løkken Bellevue	Oslo Municipality			
Melgården	Åmot Municipality			
Minister Astrup Mansion	Oslo Municipality		Hans Rasmus Astrup	
Moen Hovedgård	Trondheim Municipality		Huitfeldt	
Mæla Manor	Skien Municipality		Cappelen	
Maarud	Sør-Odal Municipality			
Nedre Nanset	Larvik Municipality		Chr. Christiansen	
Nes	Fredrikstad Municipality		Vincents Ottesson Bildt	
Næs verk	Tvedestrand Municipality			
Nøisomhet	Molde Municipality		Mathias Joacim Goldt	
Nørholm Manor	Grimstad Municipality			
Odals Verk manor	Sør-Odal Municipality			
Oslo ladegård	Oslo Municipality		Christen Mule	
Overud gård	Kongsvinger Municipality		Thorvald Meyer	
Refsnes Gods	Moss Municipality		David Chrystie	
Rein Abbey	Indre Fosen Municipality			
Ringnes	Stange Municipality		Herman Heyer	
Ringstabekk	Bærum Municipality	Heinrich Ernst Schirmer	Jens and Barbra Ring	
Risøbank	Lindesnes Municipality	Robert Lorimer	Edward Theodore Salvesen, Lord Salvesen	
Rogneby	Østre Toten Municipality			
Rød Manor	Halden Municipality			
Sakslund Manor	Stange Municipality		von Ziegler	
Sem Manor	Asker Municipality		Bernt Holtsmark	
Semb Manor	Horten Municipality			
Skallum	Bærum Municipality			
Skaugum Manor	Asker Municipality	Arnstein Arneberg	Olav V of Norway	
Skinnarbøl Manor	Kongsvinger Municipality		Christian Ludvig Scheidt Rynning	
Skredshol Manor	Ringsaker Municipality			
Smithestrøm Mansion	Drammen Municipality			
Solnør	Ålesund Municipality			
Staur	Stange Municipality			
Stend Manor	Bergen Municipality		Hans Hjort	
Store Milde	Bergen Municipality		Henrich Henrichsen Weinwich	
Store Ullevål	Oslo Municipality			
Storhamar Manor	Hamar Municipality			
Stubljan	Oslo Municipality			
Sollerud Mansion	Oslo Municipality	Heinrich Ernst Schirmer	Carl Rustad	
Svanøy Manor	Flora			
Søndre Brekke Manor	Skien Municipality		Jochum Adtzlew	
Teie	Tønsberg Municipality			
Thomas Erichsens Minde	Bergen Municipality		Thomas Erichsen	
Thorsø Manor	Fredrikstad Municipality	Olaf Lilloe	Kai Bisgaard Anker Møller	
Tjøtta Manor	Alstahaug Municipality			
Toft	Dovre Municipality			
Tomb Manor	Råde Municipality			
Torderød Manor	Moss Municipality		David Chrystie	
Tøyen Manor	Oslo Municipality		Jørgen Bjelke	
Vinje Bruk	Inderøy Municipality			
Vækerø Manor	Bærum Municipality	Heinrich Ernst Schirmer	Carl Otto Løvenskiold	
Ulefos Manor	Village of Ulefoss	Christian Collett and Jørgen Henrik Rawert	Nils Aall	
Urdi Mansion	Bergen Municipality			
Utstein Abbey	Rennesøy island			
Værne Abbey	Moss Municipality			
Østerhaug	Elverum Municipality			

== City Palé ==
Name	Place	State	Architect	Built by	Ref.
Garmangården	Oslo Municipality			Johan Garmann?	
Harmonien	Trondheim Municipality			Hans Ulrich Mølmann	
Hagerupgården Palé	Bergen Municipality		Johan Conrad Ernst	Hans Schreuder	
Hornemannsgården	Trondheim Municipality			Paul Dons	
Kallevigs palé	Arendal Municipality		Peder Krogh Bonsach Jessen	Morten Michael Kallevig	
Rosenkrantz palé	Oslo Municipality			Marcus Gjøe Rosenkrantz	
Sommergården	Trondheim Municipality			Otto Sommer	
Stiftsgården	Trondheim Municipality			Cecilie Christine Schøller	
Thorvald Meyers palé	Oslo Municipality		Wilhelm von Hanno	Thorvald Meyer	
Paléet	Oslo Municipality	Burned down		Christian Ancher	

== See also ==
- List of Norwegian fortresses
