= Rein Abbey =

Rein Abbey can refer to:

- Rein Abbey, Norway
- Rein Abbey, Austria
