= Åsulv Eiriksson =

Norwegian noble

Åsulv Eriksson A.K.A Asulf of Eastairt or Asulf Earl's kin (1190–1260) was a Norwegian nobleman (descended from an earl) who resided at Austrått and who played an important role in the closure of the civil war era in Norway. He appears to have been kin to Skule through his marriage to Skule's niece Baugeid.

Åsulv was the son of Eirik Gryvel (Gryfill) and Torbjørg Åsulvsdatter. Torbjørg was a granddaughter of Guttorm Åsulvsson, who held Rein Abbey, from his marriage to Bergljot, who was a descendant of King Magnus the Good. Åsulv Eriksson was married to Baugeid Jonsdatter, who was the only child of Jon Sigurdsson at Austrått and Sigrid Bårdsdatter, Duke Skule Bårdsson's sister and the first abbess of Rein Abbey.

In 1222 he was one of the liegemen present at a meeting which the king held. He accompanied Skule on his voyage to Denmark in 1228 along with Canute and Gregorious Johnsson. Asolf and co. successfully made it to Copenhagen and Skule was given gifts including half of the county of Halland. In the summer of 1233 he was one of the six liegemen with Skule. In 1236 he was in the custody of the king as a hostage for Skule.

When Duke Skule had founded Rein abbey he intended that Austrått should go to his sister, who had inherited and added to the monastic estate. Sigrid claimed the estate through her former marriage to John of Eastairt whereas Asolf claimed the estate through his wife Baugeid the daughter of John. However, consistent with the practice of the time, the land was property of the crown, so after a lengthy legal process in 1238 Austrått was awarded instead to Åsulv, in return for which he compensated the abbey with other lands. From that point he switched his allegiance from Skule to the king. In 1239 he came from Trondheim with his ship and Huscarls and brought tidings to the king that Skule would come from the north to seize the kingdom. This led to a bitter enmity between the two men, which, when combined with Duke Skule's rivalry for kingship of Norway, played an important role the last phase of the civil war.

In 1239 Skule led a revolt against his son-in-law, King Haakon Haakonsson, and, after losing the Battle of Oslo in 1240, sought refuge in Elgeseter Priory in Nidaros. In 1240 he was one of the five liegemen with the king when he was preparing to set sail out of Bergen. In the Spring of 1240 he was sent to lead 15 ships to Nidaros with Gunnar Kingskinsman to determine the whereabouts of Skule; they end up finding some of Skules men and killing them. Later in 1240 during the war with Skule he was one of the six commanders of 15 ships sent to scout Trondheim by the king. Åsulv and his Birkebeiners set fire to the monastery, and then killed Skule and his entourage when they tried to save themselves. With Skule’s death, the civil war era came to an end. Since killing men who had sought refuge in a priory was considered a sacrilege, Åsulv was required to do penance by going on pilgrimages.

At about the year 1200, Åsulv’s family erected the chapel which was subsequently incorporated into the fortified manor at Austrått.

Steinar Herka Åsulvsson (1235–1263) was the son of Åsulv Eiriksson and Baugeid Jonsdatter. Steinar accompanied King Håkon Håkonsson over the north sea to resolve the disputes with Scotland over the Hebrides in 1263. Records strongly suggest Steinar was married with Ragna Iversdatter Bjarkøy from Bjarkøy in Troms. They had three known children: Ægeleiv Steinarsdatter, Åsulv Steinarsson and Ivar Steinarsson. Åsulv Eiriksson lived to the unusually old age for that period of 70 years.
