= Dynge Castle =

Ruin in Sweden

Dynge Castle, Dyngehus
- Uddevalla Municipality, Sweden
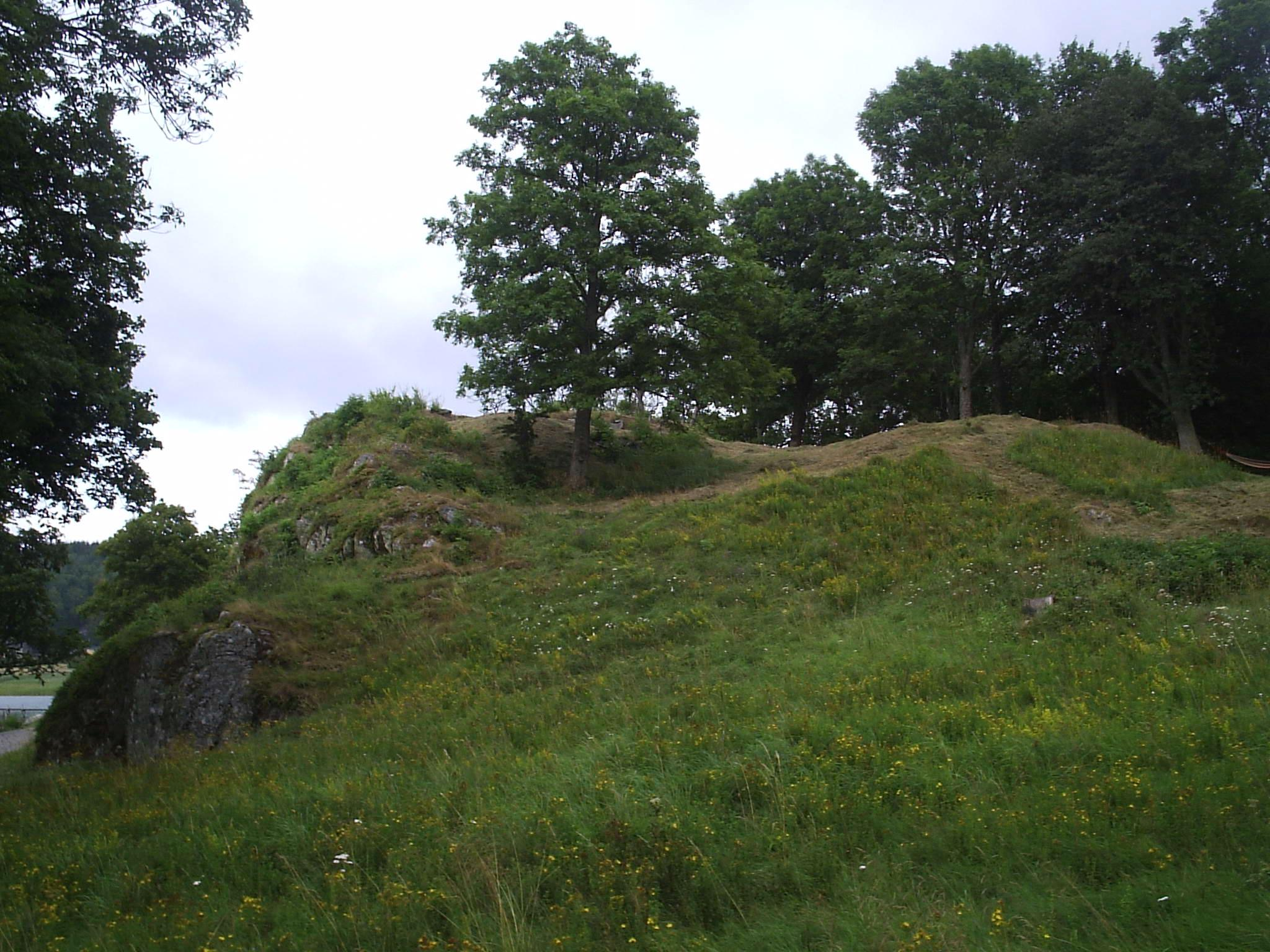

Site information
- Controlled by: Norway

Location
- Coordinates: 58.3813°N 11.6556°E

Site history
- Built: c. 1250
- Demolished: Early 16th century

Dynge Castle (Swedish: Dynge borgruin), also formerly known as Dyngehus, is a castle ruin in central Bohuslän, Sweden. It was built around 1250 when the area was under Norwegian rule and was in use until the beginning of the 16th century, when it burned down. It is one of few remaining medieval structures in Uddevalla Municipality, alongside Dragsmark Abbey and Bokenäs Old Church.

== History ==
The castle was in shape similar to a motte-and-bailey, with a stone keep surrounded by a small moat, standing on top of a cliff overlooking Gullmarsfjorden. The foundations of the central keep's walls remain clearly visible, as does the moat. The site was excavated between 1912 and 1913 by Swedish archaeologist Wilhelm Berg (1839–1915). Berg was the secretary of the Gothenburg and Bohuslän Antiquities Association and had also excavated the contemporary and similar Ragnhildsholmen fortification at Kungahälla during the 1880s and Olsborg at Tanum.

== Related reading ==
- Arne Gunnarsjaa (2006) Norges arkitekturhistorie (Abstrakt forlag) ISBN 978-82-7935-127-6

== Other sources ==
- "Dynge ruin och Gullmarsbergs säteri". Uddevalla Municipality (in Swedish). Archived from the original on 2015-06-25.
- Olsson, Per-Allan. "Dynge Hus och Börsås Kulle – Två forntida borgar i Skredsvik". Skredsvik, Herrestad och Högås hembygdsförening (in Swedish).
