= Otte Rømer =

Norwegian noble

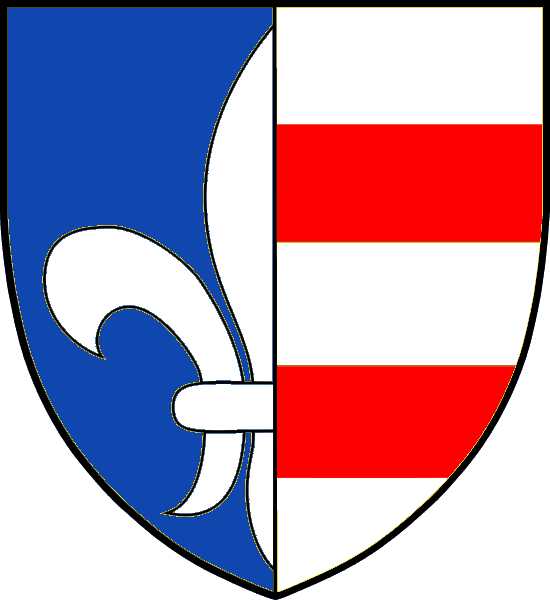
Rømer coat of arms

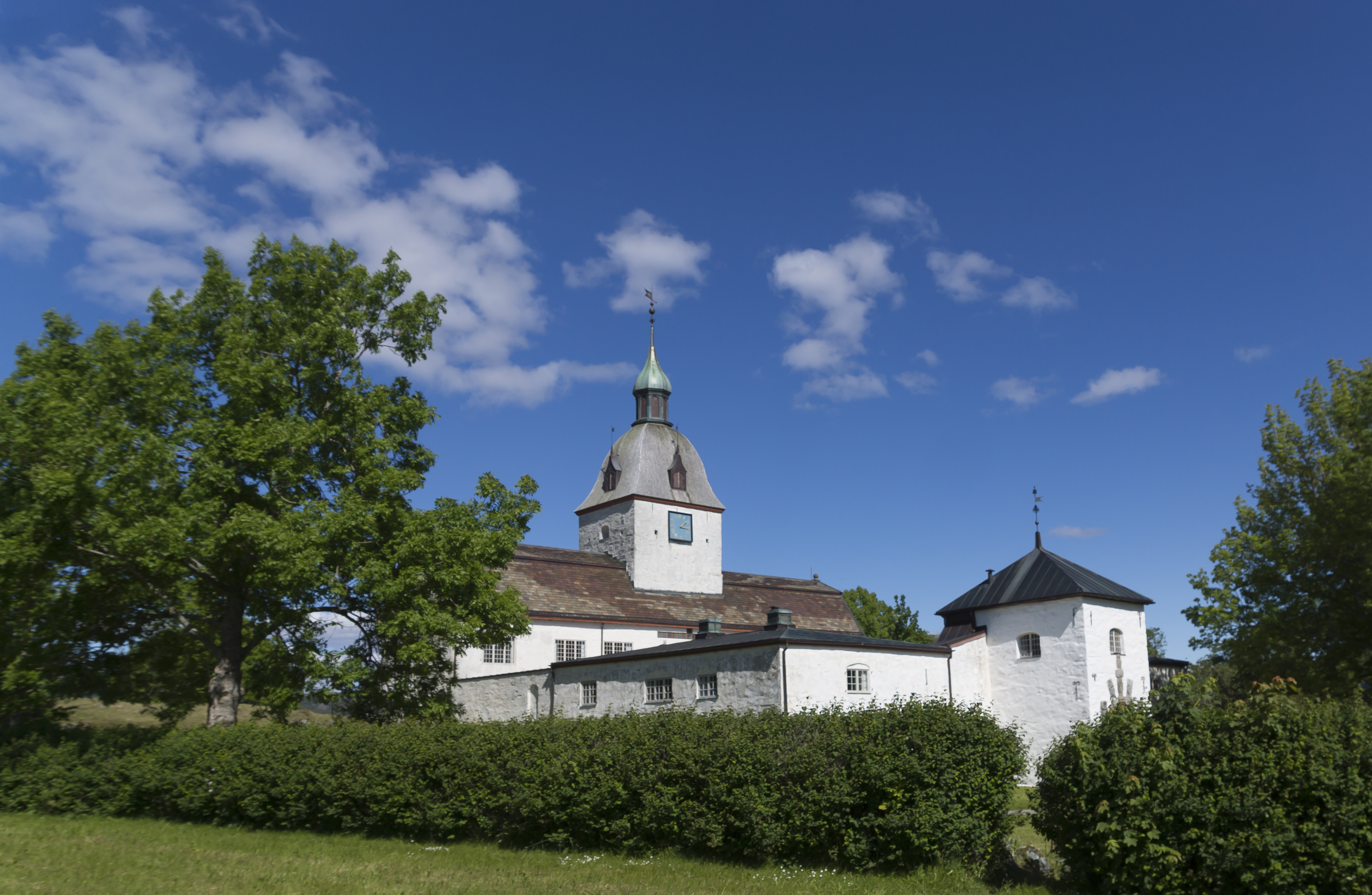
Manor of Austrått

Otte Rømer (c. 1330 – 14 August 1409) was a Norwegian nobleman, state councillor, and landowner. He is associated with establishing his family ownership of Austrått estate in Ørland, Sør-Trøndelag, Norway.

== Biography ==
His exact date of birth, place of birth and parents are not known. He is first mentioned as a member of the state council in 1370, as a relatively young man. Between 1398 and 1400, he was knighted. He was royal treasurer in Trondheim around 1371 to 1373, district governor in Hålogaland in 1385, and captain of the palace in Bergen in 1390s. He was also a member of the privy council for the child king Olav Håkonsson from 1380 to 1387, and partook in warfare with Albrecht of Mecklenburg in 1393. In 1361, Otte was awarded Audun Hugleiksson's estate by King Haakon VI of Norway; Audun Hugleiksson had been executed during the reign of King Haakon V of Norway. Through inheritance and purchases, he owned property in Østfold, Bergen, Trøndelag and Hålogaland including the Austrått estate.

== Personal life ==
His son, Svale Rømer (born 1363), was also state councilor and inherited the Audun Hugleiksson's property after his father. His daughter, Elsebe Ottesdatter (died 1448), inherited Austrått. She married Jep Fastulvsson (c. 1370–1424), a member of the State Council, and formed the starting point for the younger Rømer line. His second daughter, Margaret (born c. 1365) was married to the state councillor Gaute Erikson Galtung. He was the grandfather to Otte Matsson Rømer (c. 1440–1510); great-grandfather to Inger Ottesdotter Rømer (c. 1475–1555).
