= Leangen Gård =

Manor house in Trondheim, Norway

Coordinates: 63°26′24″N 10°28′10″E

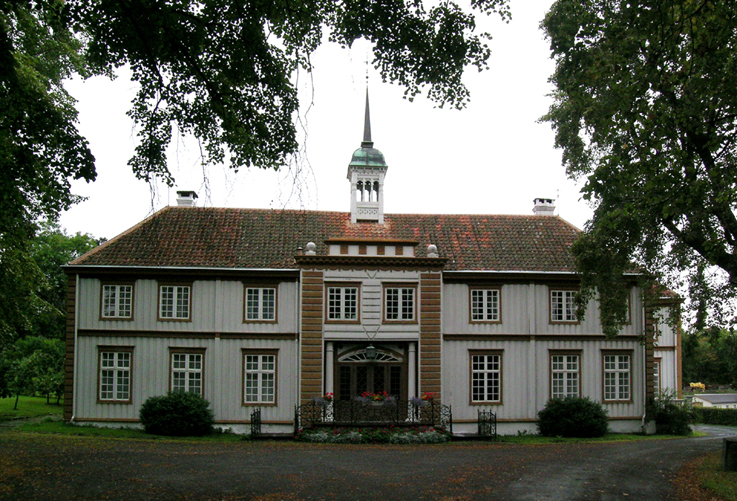
Leangen gård manor house

Leangen Gård is a manor house dating from the 17th century. It is located in the community of Lade, near Leangen Bay (Leangenbukta) in Trondheim, Norway.

== History ==
Through the centuries there has been 16 different owners. The first owners were Lauritz Bastiansen Stabel, Peder Larssen and Abraham Dreyer who lived there from 1661 to 1736. The property was divided into two separate units during 1736. The portion constituting the current estate was acquired by Councilman and Chancellor Erik Must in 1757. The manor house was erected between 1821 and 1822 by his Ludvig Must who inherited the property from his father in 1798.

Since 1963, the manor house has been owned by Trondheim Municipality. It is mostly used by the mayor and their assistants for purposes of the municipality.

The property consists of a sizable collection of buildings including the main building, detached tenant's house, a gazebo, barns and a storehouse. Interiors from the 1820s are well preserved. The facility, which includes a landscaped, panoramic English garden with swan pond and pavilion, was protected in 1923. The manor house is open for private booking by arrangement.
