= Corrodian =

Pensioners who lived in monasteries or nunneries

During the Middle Ages, Corrodians were in essence pensioners who lived in monasteries or nunneries. They were usually well-to-do elderly lay people who paid or were sponsored for accommodation and food for the rest of their lives. The stipend itself was known as the Corrody.

This payment might be in cash but would more usually be by donating land to the abbey in question. If they were men with no heirs, the whole estate could be granted to the abbey; otherwise they might 'retire' from the running of their estates and leave that to their heirs, but apportion a part that was not entailed for the abbey.

This was a way for abbeys to gain income, especially in their later days in England, when their numbers were in decline so they had space to accommodate pensioners, and less money coming in as dowers from new entrants to the orders.

This system could also be used by royal families as a way of providing retirement for their servants.

In 1468, for example, Marham Abbey in Norfolk, a house of Cistercian nuns, had three corrodians.

== In popular culture ==
In the third part of Sigrid Undset's trilogy novel Kristin Lavransdatter, the main character, Kristin, in her final years enters the monastic life as a corrodian at the convent of Rein Abbey, Norway.
