= Bokenäs Old Church =

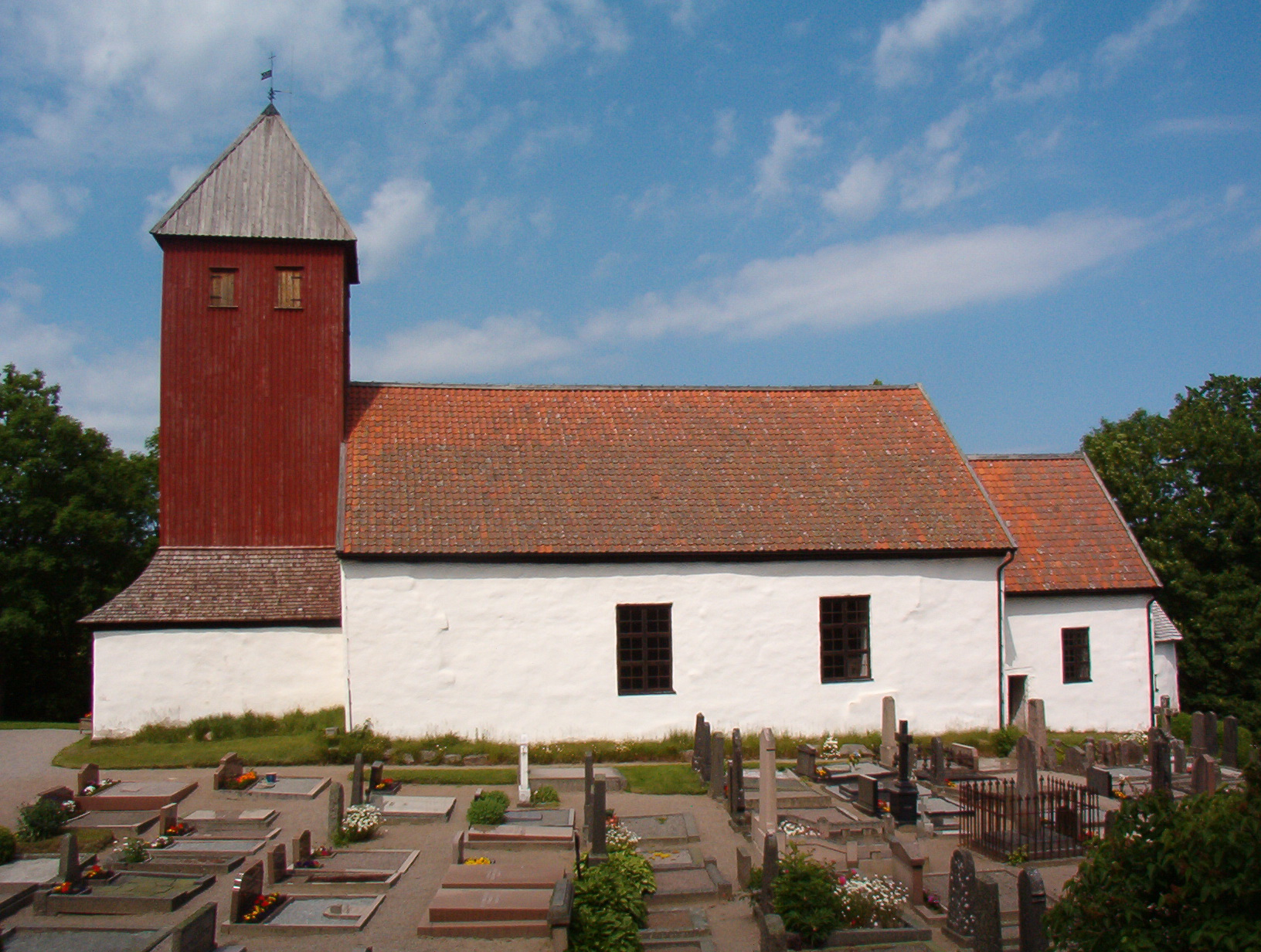
- Bokenäs Old Church
- Bokenäs Old Church
- 58°17′33″N 11°34′34″E
- Location: Bokenäs in Uddevalla Municipality, Västra Götaland County
- Country: Sweden
- Denomination: Church of Sweden

History
- Founded: Early 12th century

Administration
- Diocese: Diocese of Gothenburg
- Parish: Bokenäsets församling

Bokenäs Old Church (Swedish: Bokenäs gamla kyrka) is a medieval era church at Bokenäs in Uddevalla Municipality in Västra Götaland County, Sweden.

== History ==
It is now part of Bokenäs assembly, after Bokenäs and several other local parishes were merged in 2010. One of the most well-preserved medieval churches in Bohuslän, it was founded at some point in the early 12th century, and has been in use since. Except for parts of the interior, the weaponhouse from the 17th century, and the tower from 1752, most of the church is original. The altar, baptismal font and pulpit are from the 1770s. Interior paintings were made in 1770 by Johan Henric Dieden (1732-1817) from Uddevalla.

The church underwent restoration from 1974 to 1976 under the direction of architect Arne Nygård (1925-2014). The church is open to the public daily during the summer, and for pre-arranged visits during the rest of the year due to maintenance costs.

== Gallery ==
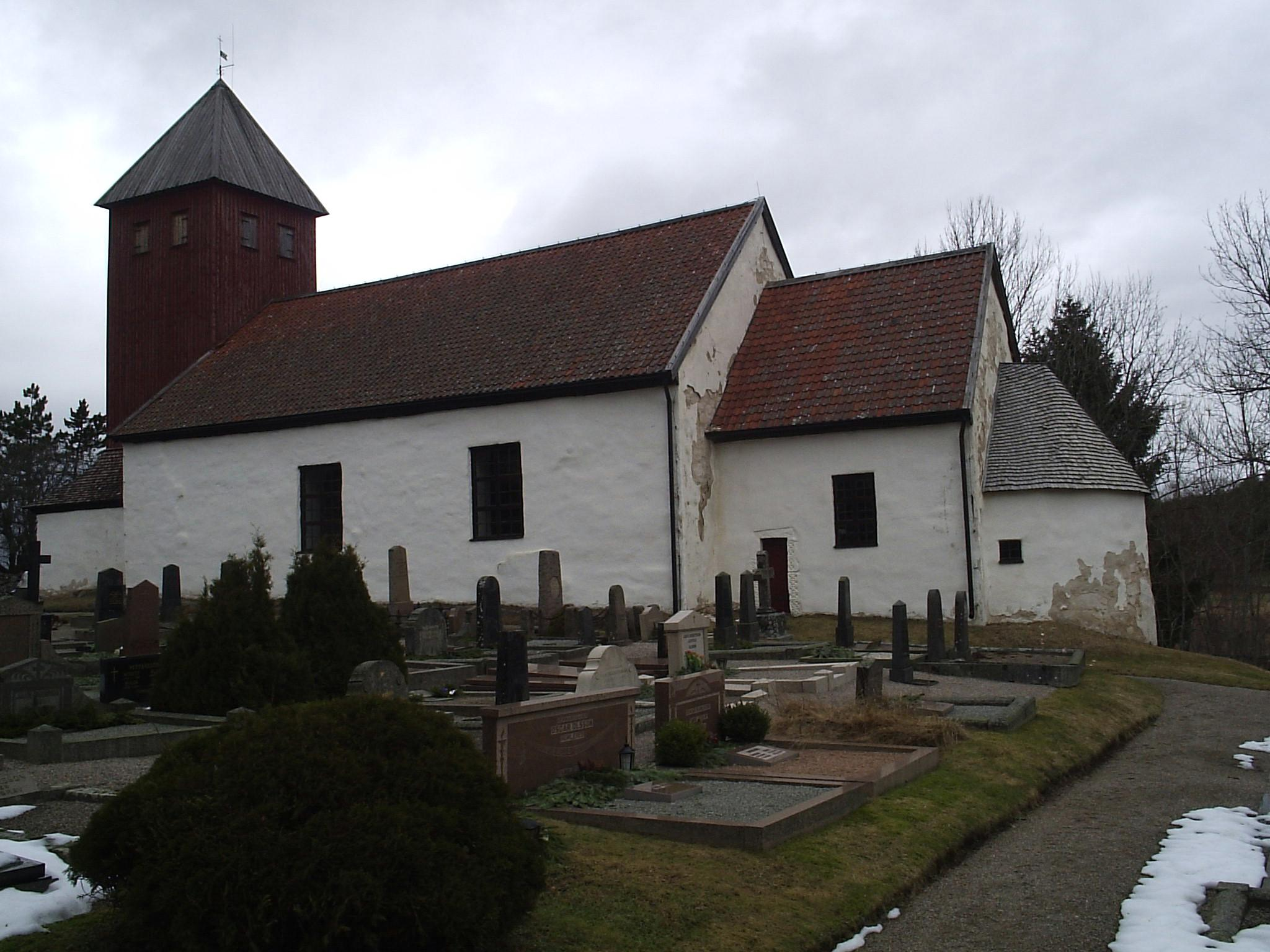
Church exterior, seen in April 2006.

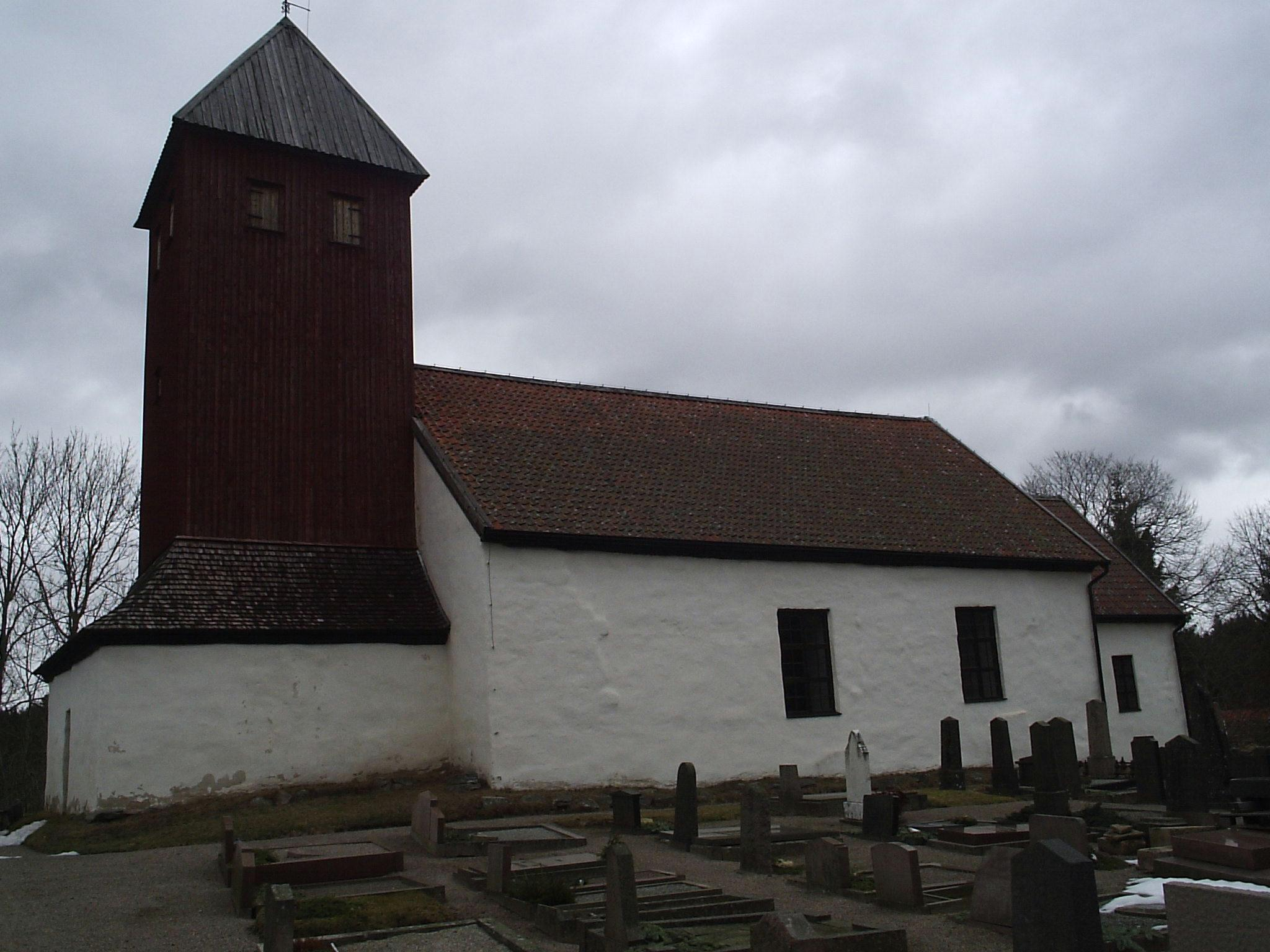
Church exterior, seen in April 2006.

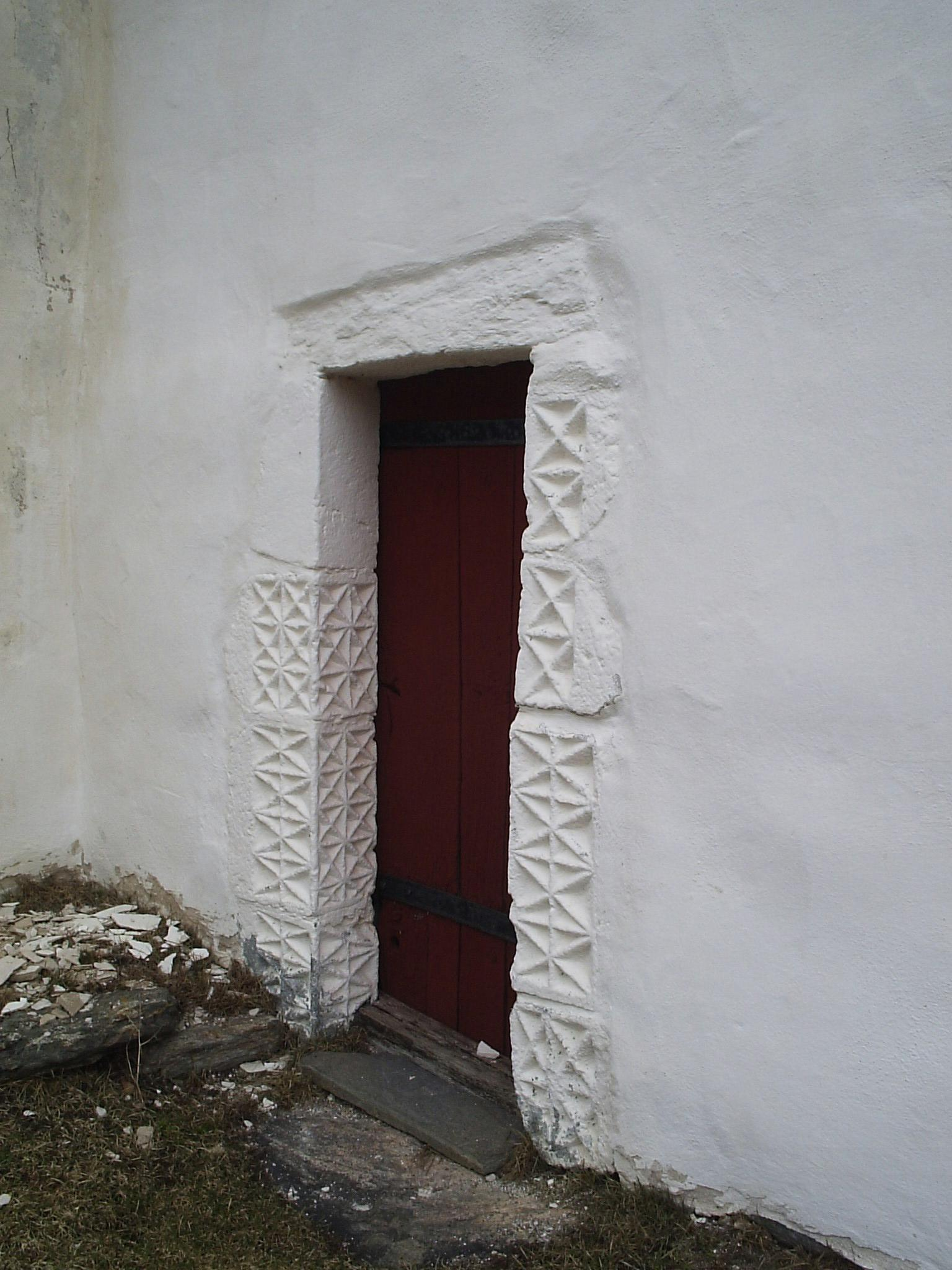
Oldest church entry, designed for defensive purposes.

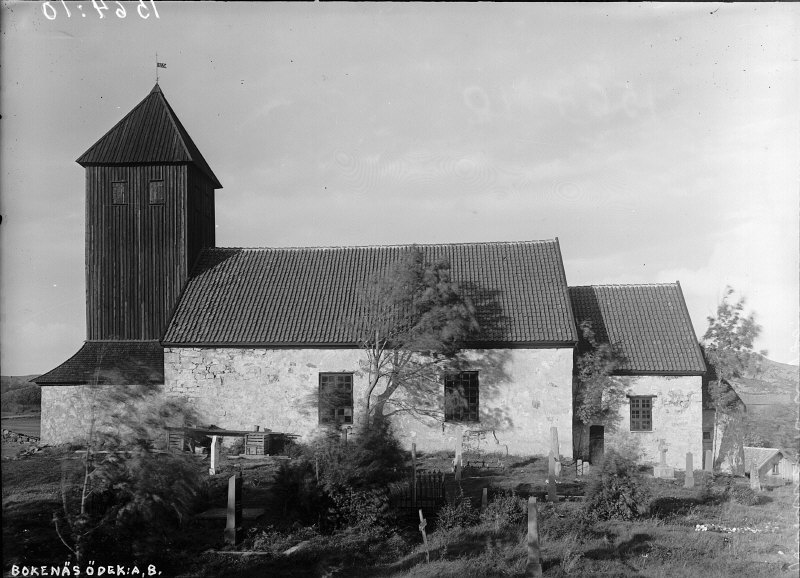
The church in 1919, after a recent restoration.
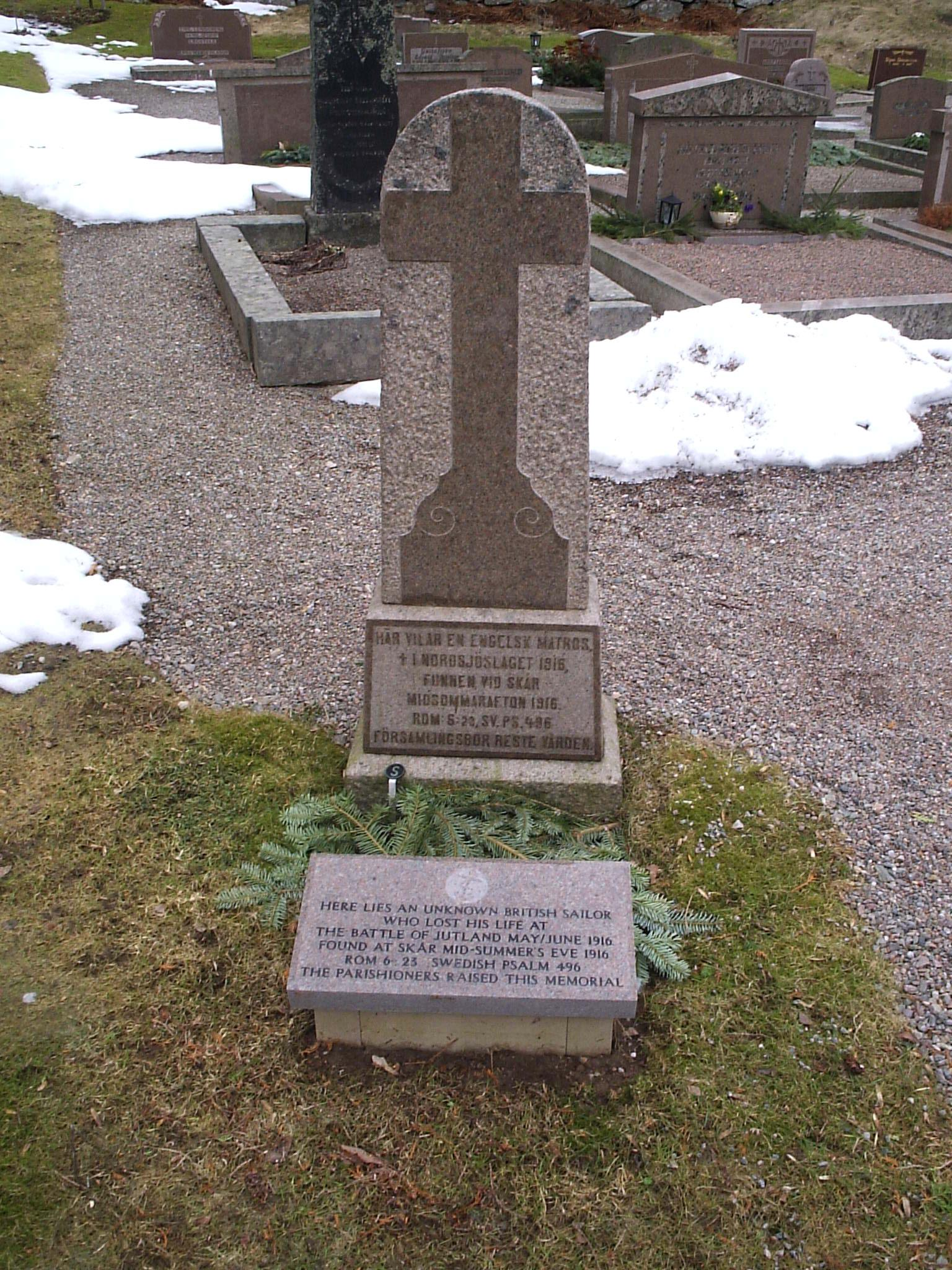
Tomb of the Unknown Soldier, in which an unidentified British sailor killed in the Battle of Jutland 1916 is buried

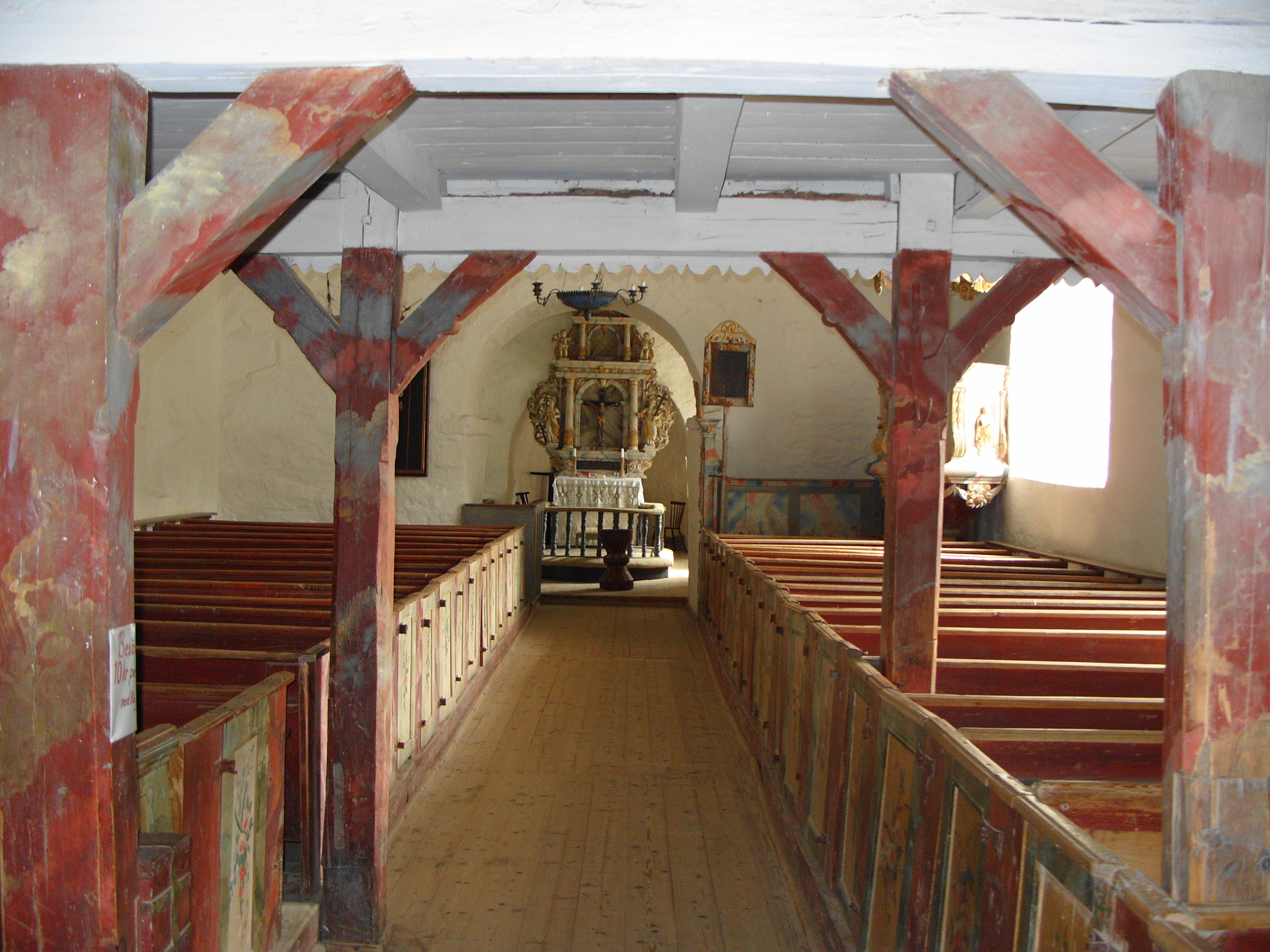
Church interior seen from the main church entry

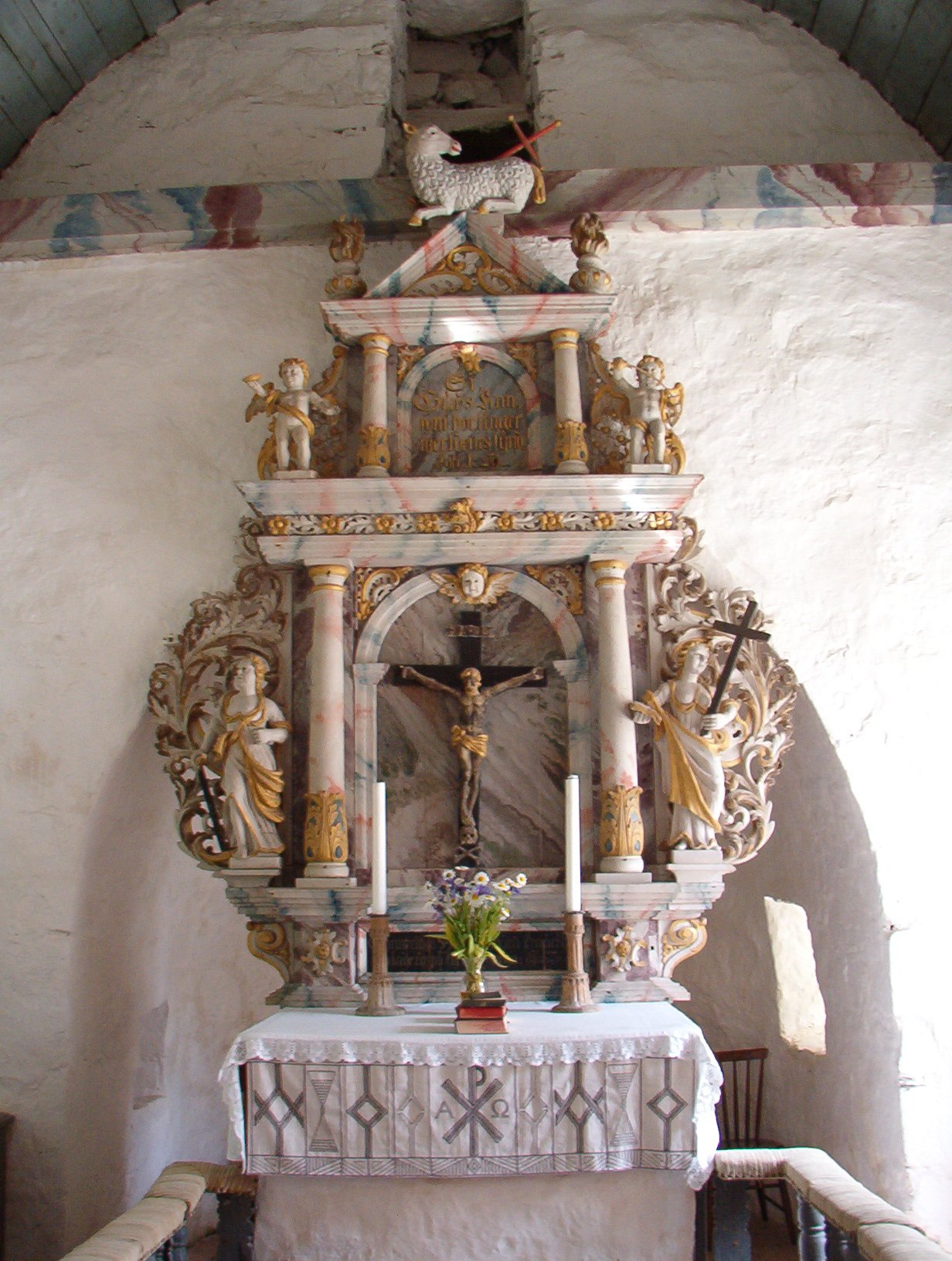
Renaissance-style altarpiece with an old apse behind

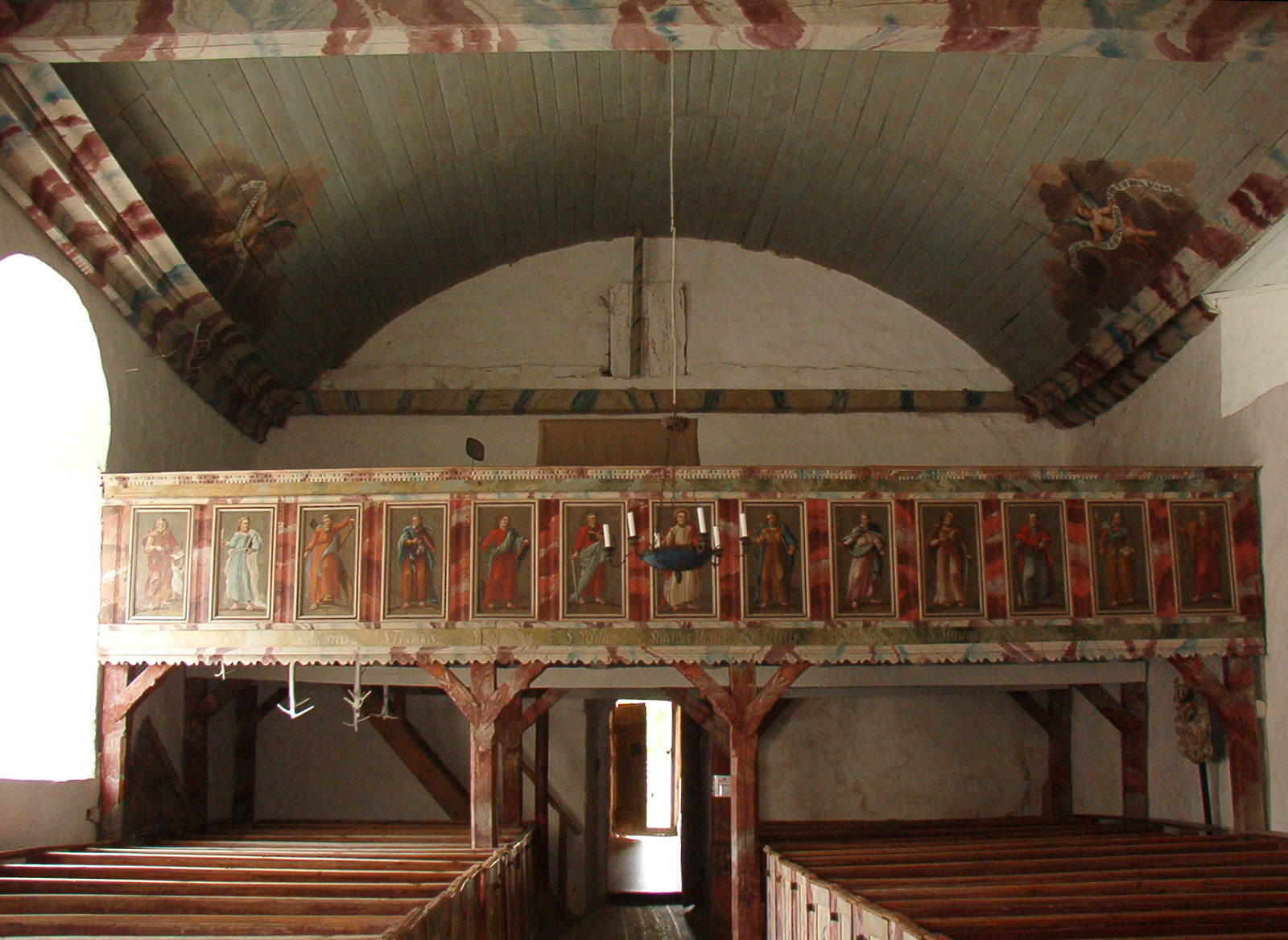
Main church exit, pews and paintings of saints by Johan Henric Dieden

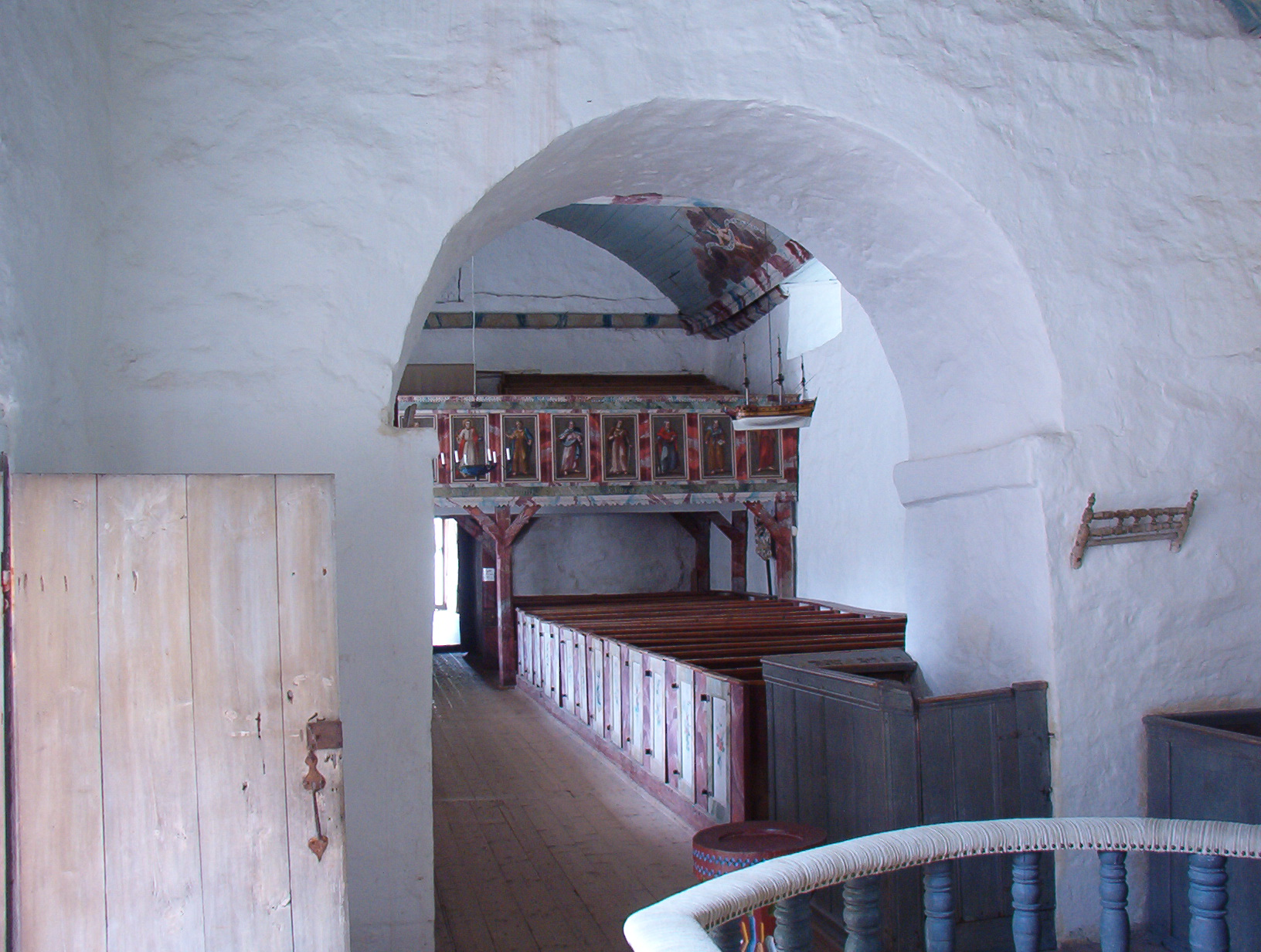
Church interior seen from the choir, next to the altar
