= Abraham Dreyer =

Danish-Norwegian official

Abraham Dreyer (1671 in Trondheim – 1736 in Trondheim) was a Danish-Norwegian official, and was for most of his working life chief judge of his home town.

In addition to being a judge, Dreyer had a career in the mountain administration. He was overbergamtsforvalte nordenfjells before he became lagmann, and became bergråd in 1721.

He was the son of his predecessor as chief judge, Peder Carstensen Dreyer, and the Dutch Anna Catharina Stricht von Hoffmerset. He became chief judge in 1703, and sat in court until his death. He became area justice in 1711 and state justice in 1731.

He was also a property investor in Trondheim and the area. He owned Austrått (although he never lived there), and was part owner of Kvikne Copper Works and Røros Copper Works.
