= Austrått =

Manor in Ørland, Trøndelag, Norway

Coordinates: 63°42′14″N 9°44′35″E

Austrått or Austrått Manor (Norwegian: Austråttborgen) is a manor in Ørland Municipality in Trøndelag county, Norway. Since the 10th century, Austrått has been the residence for many noblemen, noblewomen, and officials who played a significant role in Norwegian history. In historical records, Austrått can also be found written as Østråt, Østeraat, Østeraad, Austaat, and Austråt.

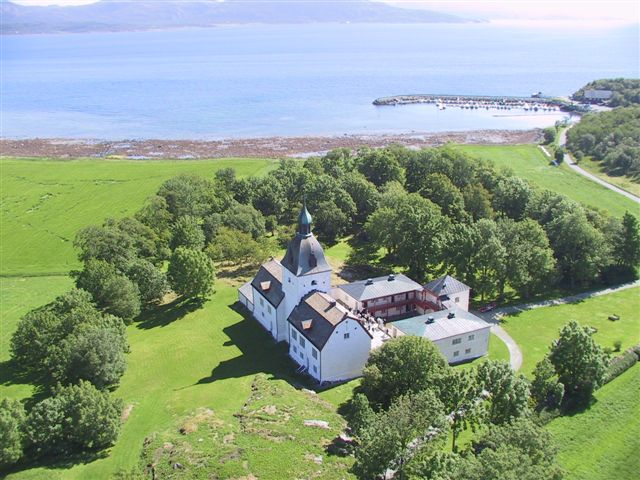
Austråttborgen on the Trondheimsfjord is one of the oldest Norwegian manors

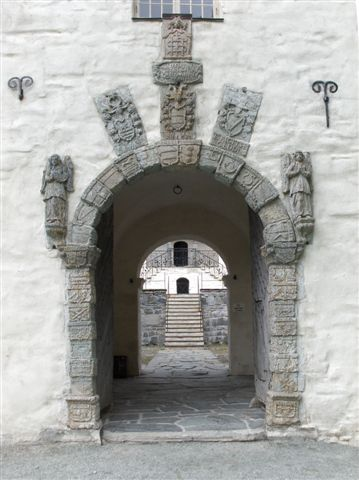
The manor's entry portal with the coat of arms carved in soapstone.

The layout of the manor as it stands today is attributed to chancellor Ove Bjelke, for whom construction was completed around 1656. The manor house burned in 1916. Restoration was begun in the 1920s and completed in 1961. The manor house was previously part of a larger property, but the land is now independent from the manor house. The Norwegian state owns the manor house, which is administered by Nordenfjeldske Kunstindustrimuseum in Trondheim. The manor is open for public tours from June until August.

The name Austrått is thought to derive from the old Norse terms for eastern (austr) and direction or (átt), which could be interpreted as eastbound, or possibly the eastern property.

== History ==
Skjegge Asbjørnsson (also known as Jernskjegge meaning Ironbeard) is the first person whose name is coupled with Austrått, though only after his death. According to the Heimskringla Saga of Olav Tryggvason, Skjegge Asbjørnsson from Uphaug in Yrjar (i.e. Opphaug in Ørland) was one of the opponents during King Olav Tryggvason's efforts to convert Mid-Norway. Skjegge spoke against him at the Frostating in 997, and King Olav's men killed Skjegge. Snorri Sturluson relates that Skjegge was buried in Skjegghaugen at Austrått (haugen from the Old Norse haugr meaning hill or mound), though this burial mound has never been identified.

Austrått is one of the oldest residences for Norwegian chieftain and officials. In the 11th century the feudal lord (lendmann) Finn Arnesson resided there. He was married to Harald Hardrada's niece Bergljot Halvdansdottir and so was related by marriage to two Norwegian Kings: Saint Olaf and Harald Hardrada. His brother Kalf was killed in battle on behalf of Harald at Funen and Finn became enemies with Harald. He then left Austrått to serve Sweyn Estridson, who appointed him as jarl ruling Halland.

After Finn, Austrått is not mentioned in the historical sources for 80 years. It is likely that, consistent with the practice of the time, the land was property of the crown. In 1130 Kåre Saksesson (also called Kåre kongsbror – literally the king's brother Kåre), is recorded as lord of Austrått. He was succeeded at Austrått by his son Sigurd Kåresson and his grandson Jon Sigurdsson. During this period the Austrått borgkapell (chapel) which still exists was constructed, most probably by Jon. Jon's daughter Baugeid then came into possession of Austrått. She married Åsulv Eiriksson, who was responsible for the death of Duke Skule Bårdsson.

=== Rømer family ===
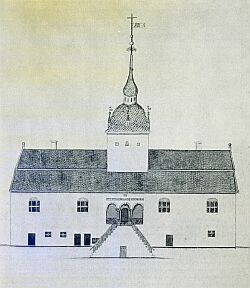
Design by Gerhard Schøning, ca 1774

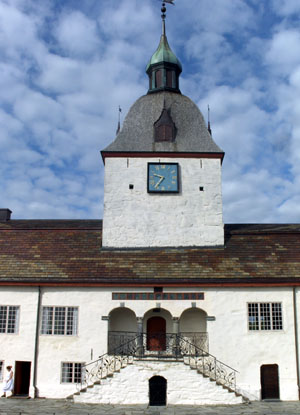
The loggia; where the master rules over worldly goods as God's and the King's representative.

There is little known about the Austrått estate ownership for the next two centuries. In the 14th century the Rømer (family) family became lords of the estate. Otte Rømer (ca 1330–ca 1411) was probably the first owner from this lineage. A member of the State Council, Jep Fastulvsson was the owner from about 1400 until 1428. His widow Elsebet Ottesdatter Rømer inherited the estate upon Jep's death in 1428 and remained in control of the estate until 1444. Through Elsebet's family Jep Fastulvsson came into possession of the estate. Jep and Elsebet's son Narve Jepsson owned the estate for four years before he died. His brother Mads claimed Austrått after Narve's death, but the property eventually was transferred to Narve's widow Philippa Borkvardsdatter Krummedike and subsequently to his daughter Gjertrud Narvesdatter. Gjertud never lived at Austrått. In about 1462 she married the Swedish knight Magnus Green and sold Austrått to his stepfather, Philippa's new husband, Henrik Jensson.

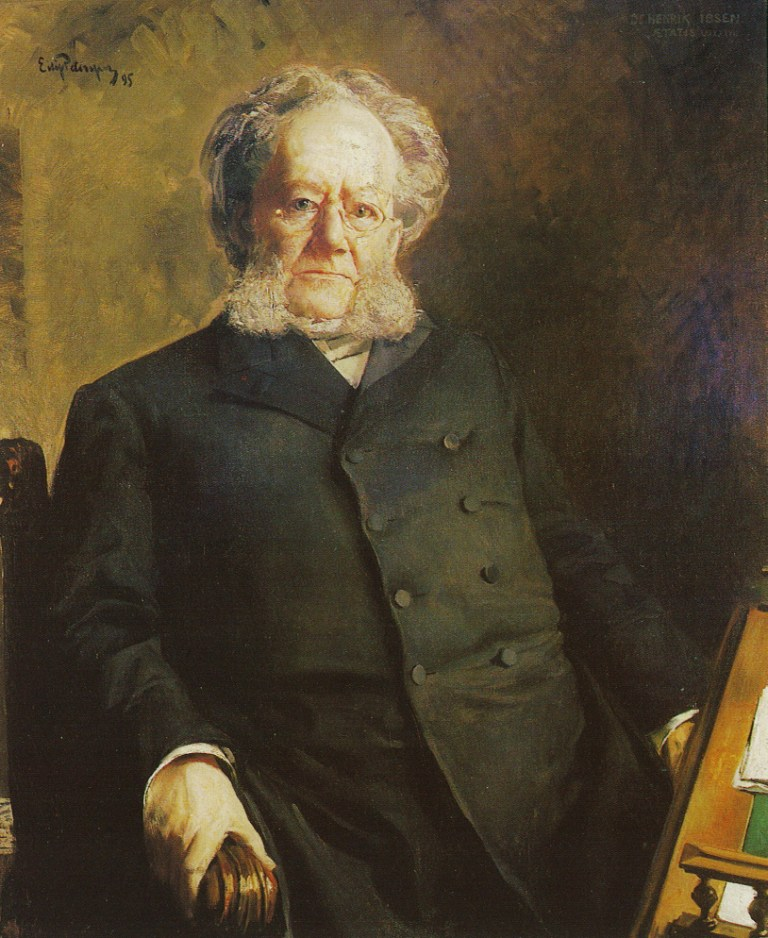
Ibsen's drama Fru Inger til Østeraad (Lady Inger of Oestraat) is set at Austrått but corresponds only roughly with historical fact.

After Henrik Jensson died sometime between 1472 and 1478, Gjertrud's cousin, Otte Madsson exercised his odelsrett and took possession of the estate in the period 1478–1481. About Otte little is known, but his daughter, son-in-law and granddaughters are well known to posterity: Chancellor and Lord High Steward of Norway Nils Henriksson ("Gyldenløve") (~1458–1523) and his wife, the famous Ingerd Ottesdatter (featured in the Ibsen play - "Fru Inger til Austrått") (~1470–1555) owned the estate ~1500–1552. Lord Niels was responsible for Sunnmøre, Romsdal and two of the districts in Trøndelag. After his death, Fru Inger became one of the most important persons in Norway during the reformation period.

Lord Nils Henriksonn was the son of the former owner Henrik Jensson. Through his marriage with Inger Ottesdatter, Lord Nils, whose family also had a hereditary claim to Austraat, resolved the conflicting claims between the families' rights of inheritance

Fru Inger Ottesdatter (Lady Ingerd of Austrått) played a key role in assuring Austrått was historically noteworthy. Gjerset has written, "Lady Ingre of Østraat was a talented, but ambitious and covetous Lady. Through the marriage of her daughters to immigrated Danish nobles who had high positions in the kingdom, she exercised a unique influence, and became the leading figure in one of the most tragic chapters in Norwegian history".

Although the political and economic change to a Lutheran state church during the reformation happened quickly, it was some time before it was widely accepted by the people. Prior to the transition, the new doctrine had been preached only in Bergen and in a few noble households along the western seaboard. Influenced by Fru Inger, Austraat was one of the households noted for early assumption of the Protestant doctrine.

It is likely that parts of the manor, as it stands today, were built during Nils and Inger's lifetime, when the main hall and the left wing of the main building were erected. Fru Inger lived quietly until her husband died in 1523, but as a widow she became politically active. Both historians and playwrights have examined the power struggle between the Protestant Fru Inger and Archbishop Olav Engelbrektsson, the last Catholic Archbishop of Nidaros. The Archbishop plundered Austrått three times, and contributed to the deaths of two of Inger's sons-in-law. On the other hand, Fru Inger was not above reproach; she harboured a pretender to the Swedish throne and behaved aggressively in several dubious inheritance-related legal actions.

During the struggle Fru Inger and her son-in-law, Lord Vincence Lunge harbored a pretender to the Swedish throne, nominally the son of Sten Sture, at Austrått. The pretender was ultimately revealed to be a criminal named Jons Hansson. Having won Fur Inger's confidence in 1526, Jons became engaged to one of her daughters. Even after the fraud had been exposed, one of Inger's sons-in-law, Vincense Lunge, continued to support the pretender - presumably to limit competition for the estate of Austrått - until Hansson was killed in Rostock. Lunge was subsequently murdered by allies of archbishop Olav Engelbrektsson January 3, 1536.

=== Bjelke family ===
In 1552, the widow Inger transferred the Austrått estate to her daughter Lucie Nilsdatter and son-in-law Jens Tillufssøn Bjelke. Inger and Lucie drowned together in 1555, at Sunnmøre during a boat journey. With Fru Inger's death, the old Norwegian nobility of the first rank had virtually died out, as had the old Danish noble families who had intermarried with them. But new noble families were founded by Danes who, upon coming to Norway, acquired estates and became thoroughly Norwegian. Among these Danes were two sons-in-law of Fru Inger. Jens Tillufssøn Bjelke, upon acquiring Austraat became the founder for the noble line of Bjelke, which held Austrått until 1699.

Jens Tillufssøn Bjelke died in 1559, and his son, Åge Bjelke (1552–1603) assumed possession of Austrått at the age of seven years. His guardian was Henrik Nielsson, the son of his maternal grandfather Niels from a previous marriage. Åge drowned in the Bjugnfjorden, and his widow held Austrått for six years before she transferred it to her son, Jens Bjelke (1580–1659). During the Åge Bjelke and Jens Bjelke periods of ownership the estate saw increased revenue as a result of the rich herring fishery on the Trøndelag coast during the 17th century.

In April, 1611 King Christian IV declared war on Sweden. Jens Bjelke and Sten Bille, then Governor of Trondelag, were directed to assemble 2,000 men and muster them in Jämtland. The movement of Norwegian troops into Sweden from Jämtland was rebuffed and Sweden took control of Jämtland. Jämtland was returned to Norway in the peace treaty and Jens did not suffer seriously for the failed invasion of Sweden, as he went on to become Chancellor of Norway. Jens Bjelke held the office of Chancellor from 1614, was feudal overlord to Bergen from 1633, in Stavanger from 1641 and later on Elingård as well.

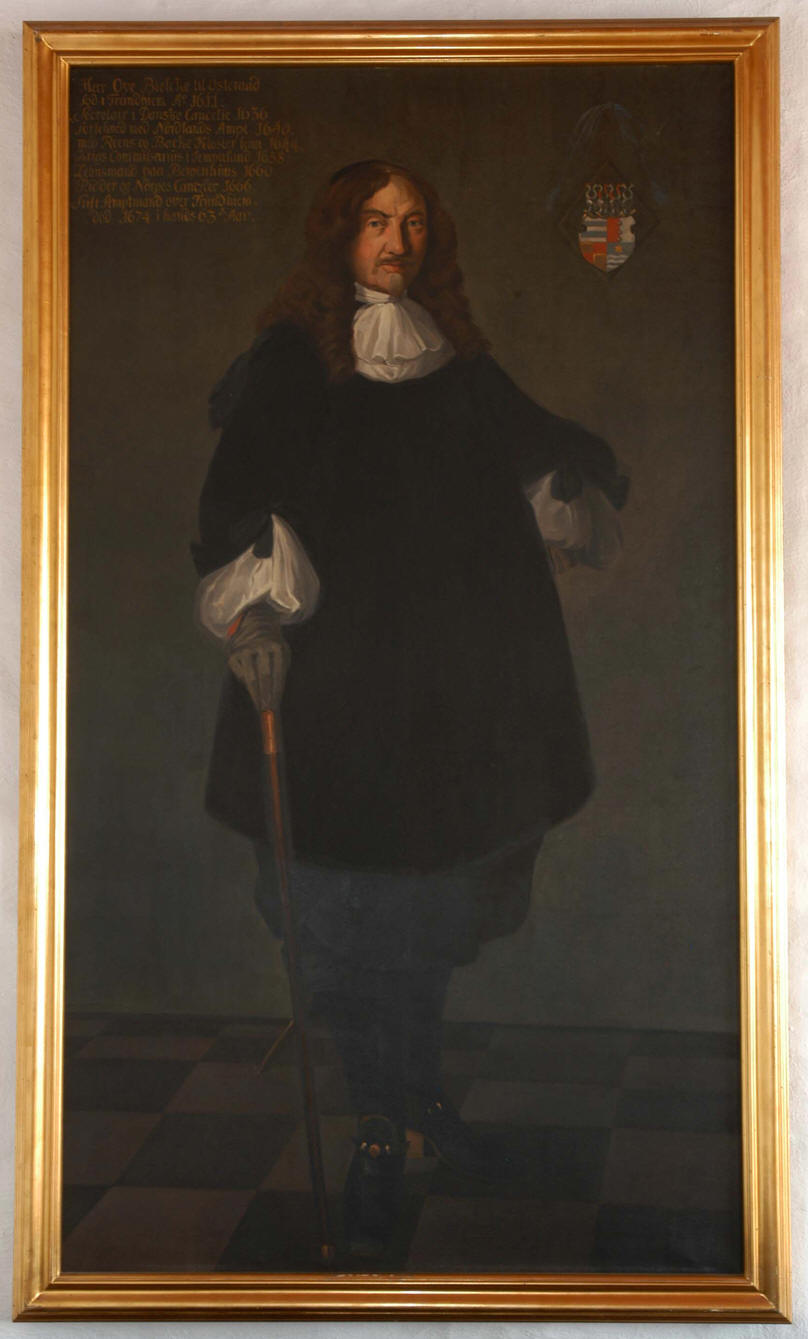
Ove Bjelke (1611–1674) was married three times: first to Maren Juel (died 1643), after 1647 to Regitze Gedde (1629–1657), and in 1660 to Hedvig Lindenow (1635–1678).

Ove Bjelke (1611–1674), who leased Austrått from 1641, took over both Austrått and the position of Chancellor for Norway when his father, Jens, died in 1659. As feudal overlord to Bakke Abbey Ove had been able to stay at Austrått on a regular basis and oversee operations there. Much of the manor as it stands today is the result of his efforts. The current design of the central building, the wings, the gateway and the design of the main staircase have been attributed to him. Ove Bjelke was educated in Padua, Italy, and sources indicate that both the central tower and pillar are based on comparable structures there. At the same time the central axis of the loggia (a gallery of Italian design) provides a clear expression of an Absolute monarchy-esque world view, with the Chancellor as the worldly authority, and thus as God's representative.

Upon Ove Bjelke's death, his three daughters did not assume control of Austrått. The estate passed to Ove's nephew Christoffer Bjelke, the son of Admiral Henrik Bjelke. Christoffer owned Austrått from 1674, but rarely visited it. In 1686 he sold the estate to his cousin Christian Frederik von Marschalck (ca 1650–1719). Marschalck, who was the son of Chancellor Johan Frederik von Marschalck (as had his uncle Ove Bjelke been), lost Austrått to bankruptcy. He left Austrått for Denmark in 1698, in 1699 and handed control of the property to his creditors, who included Den norske krigshospitalkasse and other public financial institutions. After this Austrått passed out of hereditary status as a seat of nobility, and lost its Åsetesrett status.

=== The Holtermann period ===
Abraham Dreyer (1671–1736) was a Court of Appeals Judge in Trondheim, a mayor and a significant investor. In 1721 he purchased Austrått through the bailiff who was acting on behalf of the creditors. Dryer never took up residence there, but paid for renovations. In 1736 he sold the estate to the judge and counselor Søren Dass, who took up residence at the manor; he is buried in the chapel burial chamber. In 1760 his widow sold the property to commerce counselor Hans Holtermann (1709–1781), which began 103 years of Holtermann family ownership. This first Holtermann sold a portion of the estate properties in Stjørna, and is probably responsible for modifications of the manor such as the addition of a mansard roof to the main hall. He transferred ownership of the estate to his son Eiler Hagerup Holtermann (1748–1800). Both in Eiler's and in his son Ove Bjelke Holtermann's (1782–1857) ownership period many tenant farms were sold, reducing the size of the estate.

Around 1770 Eiler Horn Mann imported cattle from Ireland and the Netherlands. This became the basis for a separate local cattle breed known as "Austråttfe", which through the loan of breeding stock became dominant in Ørland and the neighboring villages from 1806 until 1902. The characteristics of Ove Bjelke Holtermann's Austråttfe bred cattle was a deep red body colour with a white head.

The priest Eiler Hagerup Holtermann (1811–1872) assumed the estate from his father in 1857, but spent little time there as his ecclesiastical duties kept him elsewhere. Eiler Holtermann sold part of the estate at Gjølga, a large forestry property in Bjugn before he sold Austrått to Anders Gravrok in 1863. Gravrok was resident at Austrått for 6 years before he declared bankruptcy. Eiler H. Holtermann was the only one who bid on the estate at the bankruptcy sale and in 1871 resumed ownership of Austrått. He died in 1872. His widow Anna Andrine Holtermann arranged to sell land in Tarva, before she sold Austrått in 1873 to Ole Rise (1835-1899) from Oppdal Municipality.

=== Farmers and financiers ===
Ole Rise owned the manor for 9 years, before his interest was purchased by John Heftye (1849–1907). Rise then settled in Stjørdal, where he bought Ree farm. During the period he owned Austrått, he also owned Sundnes distillery in Inderøy Municipality. There had previously been a dairy operation on Austrått, probably from 1858, and continuing until the dairy burned down sometime in 1879 and Rise continued it. Rise's stewardship of the Austrått property has been the source of some disagreement. Andersen/Bratberg writes that "Rise ... has received a bad reputation as a man who depleted the property and was only interested in making the most money possible out of it"; while local historian Terje Sørensen wrote that "Ole Rise ran the property well, putting into use the existing buildings and building an extension to the cow barn. It was called "Rise Cow Barn." He received the prize for good cattle care in 1875, and was awarded prizes at exhibitions of livestock and dairy products".

Johannes Thomassen Heftye (1849–1907) owned Austrått from 1882 until his death in 1907. He came from a wealthy Kristiania family, was the son of Thomas Johannessen Heftye, lived in the Austrått manor, and worked actively to re-create the master farmers or estate feel both inside and outside of the manor. Heftye was considered somewhat "eccentric" by locals and came into conflict over property rights. A dispute over the use of a right-of-way resulted in Heftye shooting and accidentally killing a man on 26 December 1899.

Politicians and speculator Peder Rinde (1844–1937) owned Austrått from 1908 to 1912. He reduced the size of the estate's property by selling a number of plots. A formal distinction between the manor and the estate as separate property was filed in 1912, but was not legalized until later under another owner. In 1912 Rinde sold Austrått to Kristiania-capitalist (consultant and industrialist) Georg Walentin Hammer, who owned Austrått for 2 years. Both under Rinde and Hammer, the agronomist Olaf Arnstad served as the farm manager. Hammer sold Austrått by auction in 1914 – it was purchased by a consortium, consisting of timberman Simen A. Landet, brewery owner Gunnerius Flakstad and attorney Hans Christian Bull Heyerdahl'. All three were resident in Hedmark, and the first two directors were directors of the Oplandske Kreditbank.

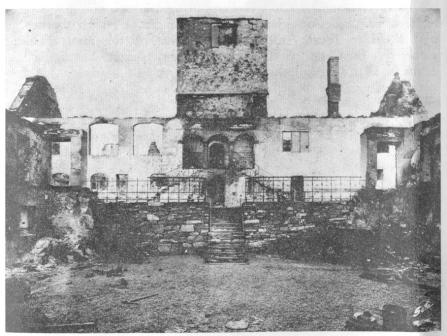
The manor after the fire in November 1916

== Real property overview ==
It is difficult to determine how large the estate of Austrått was. The simplest reckoning is that it included all properties in the neighborhood of Fosen that were not owned by the church. In addition, a number of the Lords of Austrått owned the property elsewhere in Norway, which is considered integral to Austrått. The property related to Austrått, or more precisely owned by the Lord of Austrått, was probably at its greatest during the ownership of Ingerd Ottesdatter (Lady Inger) and her descendants, such as Jens Bjelke. After Jens Bjelke the estate was divided among his 8 children, and was substantially reduced.

Although the extent of the estate varied with time, it is possible to get a sense of it from accounts of Jens Bjelke's estates, which were prepared as part of a national timberland inventory at King Frederik III's order in 1648. The extent of the properties was probably at its largest since at the time Jens Bjelke managed the legacy of his mother, Fru Margrethe Thott, which included Tønnøl as the head estate. This legacy was divided among several heirs in 1649.

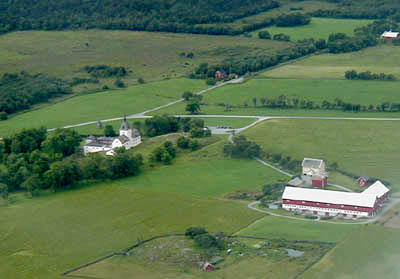
Austrått manor house to the left, the lands (Austråttgården) to the right.

Jens Bjelke's properties (1648)
District	Head estates owned by Bjelke	Inventory of farms and tenants tied to the estate
Fosen	Austrått	83 farms, 107 tenants
Fosen	Tønnøl near Nes	31 farms, 35 tenants
Fosen	Storfosen, Storfosna	21 farms, 35 tenants
Fosen	Holla in Hemne	26 farms, 38 tenants
Nordmøre	Kanestraum	19 farms, 23 tenants
Hedemarken	Hovinsholm in Nes, Hedmark	31 farms, 30 tenants
Hedemarken	Skredshol in Ringsaker	20 farms, 21 tenants
Østfold	Elingård in Onsøy	41 farms, 49 tenants
Østfold	Kjølberg in Onsøy	23 farms, 26 tenants
Østfold	Evje gård, Evje in Rygge	25 farms, 26 tenants
Østfold	Sande gård, Sande in Tune	36 farms, 40 tenants
Østfold	Veden in Tistedal	12 farms, 11 tenants
Østfold	Herrebrøden in Rokke	10 farms, 12 tenants

In total the Bjelke estate in 1648 amounted to more than, in the units of the period, 1,438 tønne of land. This is equivalent to approximately 566 hectares (1,400 acres) of arable land.

The jordebøker (a cadastral survey) of the time provides a comprehensive register of the metes-and-bounds for real property in Norway. A comparison of the jordebøker from 1639 covering the properties of 56 Norwegian lords records a total property holding of 9,605 tønne. Of this Jens Bjelke owned 1,124 tønne, which amounted to 12% of the arable land held by nobility. Bjelke was by far the largest property holder; the next closest man on the list was Governor Christoffer Knudsen Urne with a real estate holding of 558 tønne.

Of the 83 farms which Jens Bjelke held as part of the Austrått estate, the record shows that the largest number were in Ørland parish (Orland, Bjugn and Stjørna). Five were in Jøssund, five in Åfjord, Five in Roan and one in Stoksund.

== The manor buildings ==
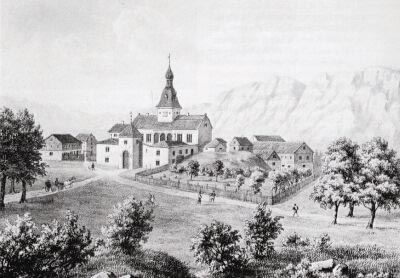
Illustration from 1857. Austrått manor shows traces of styles from many centuries. The supply yard on the north side is long gone, but the main building, the burial chapel, the courtyard with side buildings, the tower and the gateport remain.

Imposing manor houses, common to the other Scandinavian countries and to much of western Europe during the Renaissance, were scarce in Norway since the native nobility lacked the necessary means. Among those that were built in the 17th century, "the most famous was that of the Bjelke family at Austraatt."

The manor yard has been through several transformations in the course of its approximately 800 years of recorded existence. The Manor House and yard has been constructed, since the 1650s, around and incorporating a stone church. Prior to construction of the stone church in 1150–1210, it is believed that there was a wooden church located there for approximately 150 years. The church has been updated with new interior in the Baroque style, but several sculptures dating from the 13th century remain preserved there. The central axis tower of the manor was at one time the west tower of the church.

The manor is believed to have been completed in its present form by 1656. Legend has it that Ove Bjelke's second wife Regitze Gedde was not satisfied with the existing buildings on Austrått, and that she urged him to improves the buildings with remarks such as "The barns of Sem farm are finer than the houses here." The buildings that still stand, together with the remaining courtyard walls, constitute only a part of the former manor facilities.

Today a portion of the manor structures are preserved, but the buildings dedicated to economic production have been removed, probably at the end of the 19th century. Residences for the staff and shops (operating buildings) were located to both the north and west of the main manor (see the drawing from 1857).

The manor house is built in the Renaissance style, but the decorations are Baroque. This can be seen at the main gate entering into the courtyard. The coat of arms for Ove Bjelke and his first two wives are carved in soapstone over the portal, while along the sides of the portal can be found the coats of arms from earlier generations on his mother's side.

The manor house is laid out symmetrically. It is 33 meters from the foot of the stairs to the top of the tower, and 33 meters from the foot of the stairs to the main gate portal.

=== The chapel and its furnishings ===
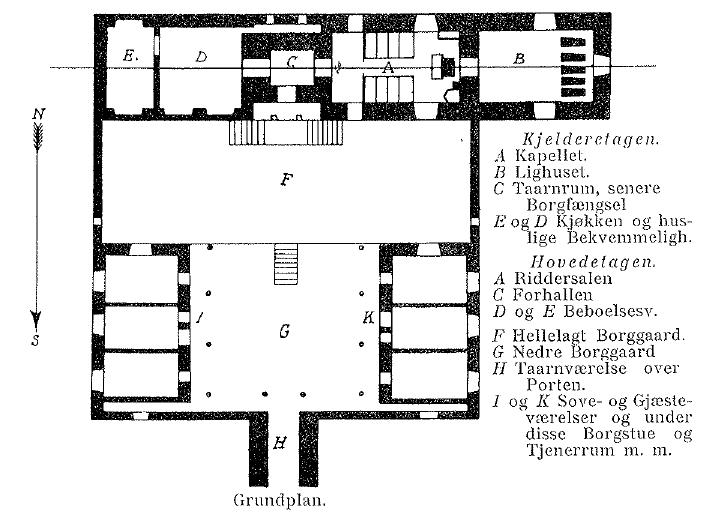
Drawing of the manor floor plan

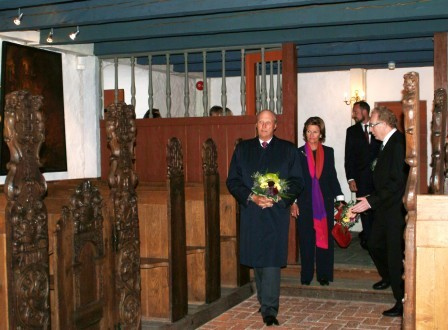
Guided tours of the castle chapel during the royal family's visit in 2006

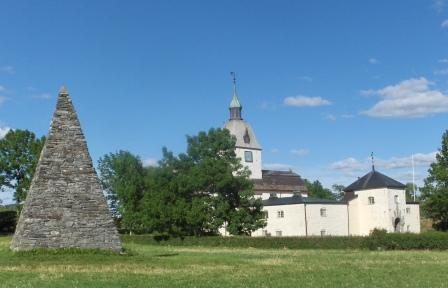
The manor house with the pyramid in the foreground

The chapel, with its noticeably thicker walls, comprises one side of the current main building, standing approximately 13 meters up to the ridge. In the west end there was a narrow tower which today lies on the central axis of the main building. Today's low ceiling in the chapel dates back to the reconstruction that was carried out in the 17th century. In the tower there may previously have been a private chapel for the manor's gentleman on the floor above the ground floor. Behind the chapel lies a partition, probably listed in records as the chancel rail ~1620, but moved to the back during reconstruction of the chapel. The chapel pews have carved end-ornamentation, and one of the pew doors is preserved.

The altarpiece is in the 1650-century Baroque style and was painted and carved by anonymous artists. The painting shows the crucifixion, while the carved angels on the frame exhibit the passion-cycle implements: nails and a thorny crown. At the bottom of the altarpiece, under the image, are carved the coat of arms for Bjelkes, Juuls and Lindenows. A chalice and a silver altar dish from 1655 are preserved at Austrått. A chasuble from 1662 is preserved in the church's collection. The carved pulpit is from the early 17th century.

In addition to the altarpiece, 4 of the 7 paintings with biblical theme that Ove Bjelke acquired for the chapel are preserved. In addition 7 of the 10 sculptures from the Middle Ages were rescued from the fire in 1916. The most important of these is the Austrått Madonna, one of four sculptures in the chapel which date from the period of 1220–1260, and which were either imported from northern England, or were carved in Trondheim by an English craftsman. There are also two sculptures of Saint Olaf, from 14th and 15th centuries.

The coffins of Ove Bjelke, of his first two wives Maren Juul and Regitze Giedde, as well as of a later owner, Judge Søren Dass (who died in 1757) lie in the burial chamber beneath the church. The entrance to the burial chamber lies behind the altar. The burial chamber was built in 1667 by Ove Bjelke. The coffins were buried in the Ørland church yard from 1859 to 1928. They were returned to the manor during the feast of Saint Olaf in 1928; a large ceremony with 3000 spectators accompanied the return.

=== The main building ===
The main building was built around the chapel. The exact dates of construction are unknown, but it was likely to have been completed by Ove Bjelke in 1665/66. The manor's great hall, now called the "Knight's Hall", lies above the chapel and in the right portion of the main building. This hall has been used for governmental meetings and formal occasions. In Ove Bjelke's time it was adorned with 11 paintings, of which the most important was a portrait of King Christian IV. Since the post-fire restoration it now displays the portrait of Ove Bjelke and his three brothers Jørgen, Henrik and Christian Bjelke. This hall has been restored with patterns similar to the floor of the 18th century; previously, the floor had been patterned brick. The fireplace from 1625-50 in the Dutch Renaissance style, "is among the foremost at Austrått". On the west wall, along the hall-tower axis, are two oak doors, reconstructed in the style of the originals from the 17th century.

Upstairs west of the tower there are two rooms, the first of which is greater than the other. The first has been used as a living room, and has both a fireplace and a kakkelovn (glazed-tile stove or "cocklestove"). During Ove Bjelke's time an armory (weapons collection) was stored here. A tin tray, made in Hamburg in 1666, with Ove Bjelke's and Hedvig Lindenow's coat of arms, are on display there now. Until 1800 the innermost, smaller space was divided into two separate rooms: the Lord's and the Lady's bedrooms.

From the end of the 19th century the left portion of the first floor of the main building served as the kitchen and pantry. Today it serves as the cafe and giftshop for visitors.

The tower spire has the initials EHand the year 1781 carved in it, commemorating the year that Eiler Holtermann took over Austrått from his father.

=== Courtyard and building wings ===
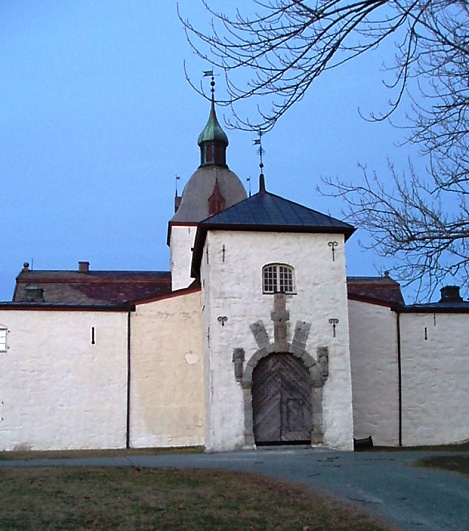
The building first appeared in its current built form in 1656

In the 17th century the main building was supplemented by connecting walls which tie the two side wings to the main building. The side wings each contain dwelling rooms. The wings are connected by walls to the gate tower with the entry portal centrally positioned in the tower. From the outside the walls are arranged such that the manor appears essentially square in layout. There is a significant increase in elevation (from south to north) in the courtyard, so that the terrain in the upper part of the manor courtyard is level with the main building vestibule and level with the second floor of the side wings. The bedrock is visible both on the surface in the lower courtyard, and in the transition area. Both the upper and lower courtyards are paved with flagstone. The steps connecting the levels were built in the 17th century.

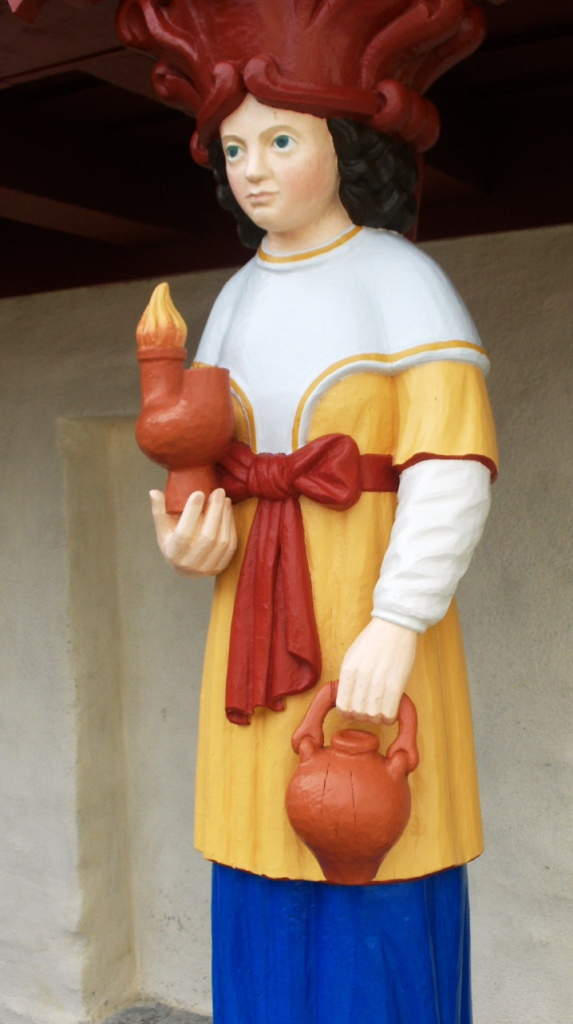
One of the five prudent bridesmaids.

In the vestibule of the courtyard one can see the side wings second floors. The columns that hold the roofs of the side wings are carved wood with a religious theme. They represent the ten bridesmaids, five wise and five foolish, known from Jesus' parable of the bridge groom in the Gospel of Matthew, Chapter 25. Statues of two young angels, and of four male figures from the Old Testament (Moses, Joshua, Elia and probably Gideon) are on the west end of the courtyard. The original figures from the 17th century were Baroque in character, while the reconstructions from the 1950s are made in a cleaner, tighter style.

A double staircase of authentic wrought-iron construction, and a roofed gallery (loggia) with three arches are centrally located on the main building, serving as a dominant feature for both the main building and the courtyard. Coats of arms and bible verses which attest to Lord Ove Bjelke origin and status are carved above the gallery arches. As viewed from the lord of the manor's position at the head of the stairs, the ten bridesmaids are arranged symbolically: they are distributed with the bad bridesmaids to the left and the good bridesmaids to the right.

The manor layout is designed to emphasize the lord of the manor's role as a Chancellor, as the King's representative and thus as God's deputy in the country and on the estate. The parable of the bridesmaids in Matthew's Gospel, ends with a speech: "Then shall the King say unto them on his right hand: 'Come, you who are blessed by my Father'." and "Then shall he say to those on the left hand, 'Depart from me, ye cursed…'" Similarly the location of the caryatid-like figures from the Old Testament also emphasizes who the lord of the manor sees as his peers: the lawmaker, the military leader and the prophet are at his level and to his right.

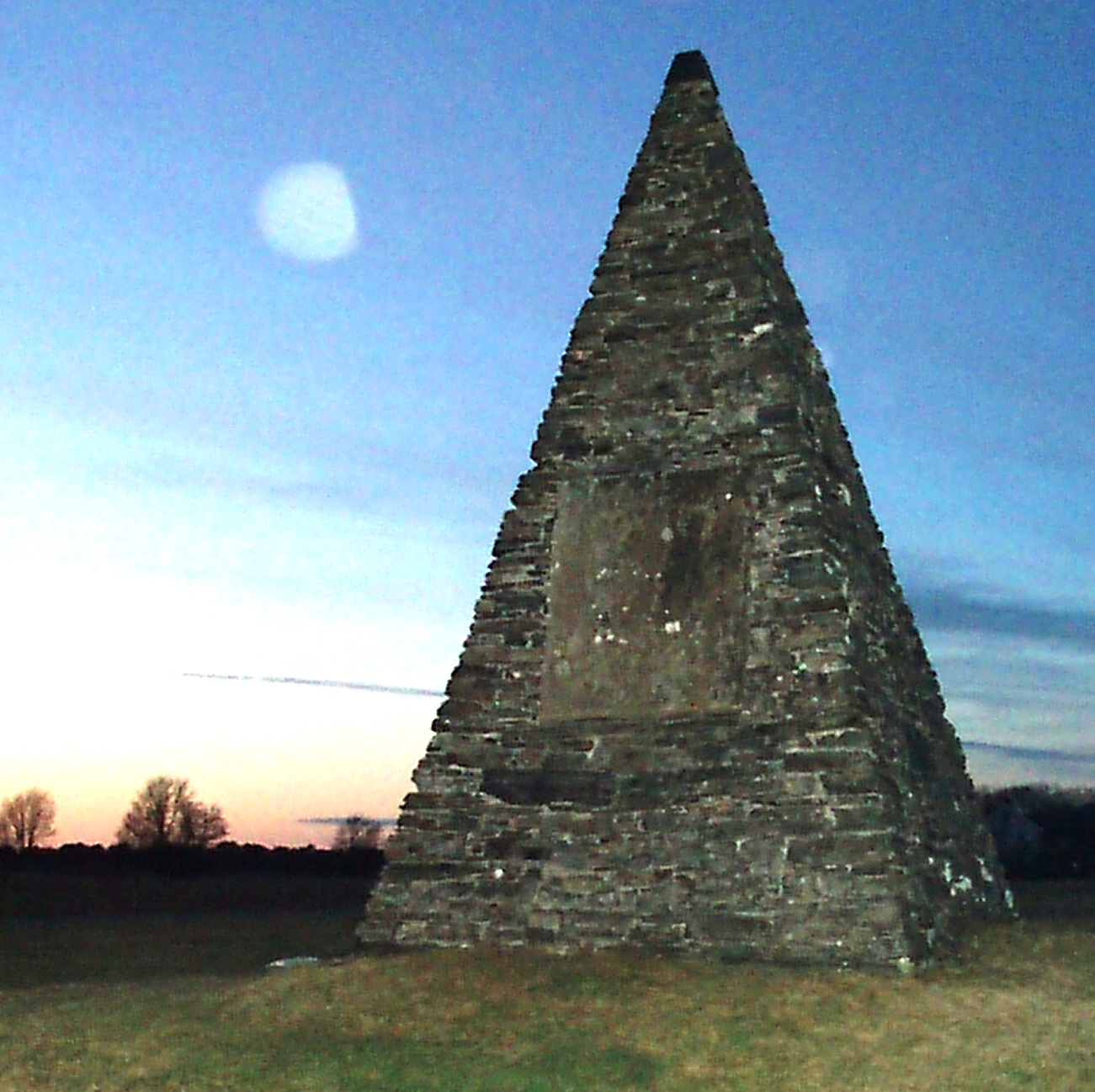
The pyramid at Austrått

There is an inscription in Latin over the main door, inside the gallery: With God's help Ove Bjelke has committed to preserve this edifice for his heirs.

=== The pyramid ===
A square, stone pyramid southwest of the fortress bears a plaque with the inscription: «Her bær den Sted nu Korn som fordum haffuer baaren den dyre Rigens Mand af Herren sielff udkaaren Jens Bielcke, som i Fem og Fyrretiuffe aar Rett Landsens Fader och To Kongers Kandtzler waar». The plaque also bears the coats of arms of Ove Bjelke and of his three wives, as well as a Latin text that says that Bjelke, "a much-loved eldest son and father' successor in office". The plaque suggests the monument was erected in 1665. Stylistically it is not likely that the pyramid was built in 1665, and it is postulated that the memorial plaque was relocated from elsewhere to the pyramid when it was raised ain the 18th century, sometime before 1774.

== From the 1916 fire until the present ==
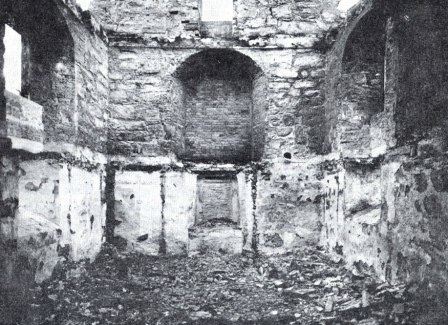
The burnt out chapel in 1916

Austrått manor burned down the night of 28 November 1916. The fire is attributed to a lightning strike. All wood in the building burned, including the 14 carved statues around the manor. The estate manager, Julian Frengen, and neighbor Peder Hagemo were two of the men who played an important role in the efforts to rescue the church furnishings. They succeeded in saving most of the church inventory including 7 of 10 medieval sculptures, along with the pulpit, church silver, altarpiece, 4 of 7 paintings, 4 grave epitaphs and other smaller items. They received a silver medal, HM The King's Medal of Merit, in January 1917 in recognition of their efforts.

From 1914 to 1919 the manor was co-owned by private owners. The owners had no prospects for restoring the facility after the fire, and offered to given the manor to the Society for the Preservation of Ancient Norwegian Monuments. In 1919 the state became the owner and restoration was begun. Restoration was carried out in collaboration with Nidaros Domkirkes Restaureringsarbeider, under the leadership of Wilhelm Swensen. Restoration was completed in 1961. Fortunately Austrått Manor had been extensive measured and the buildings carefully described by the architect Lorentz Harboe Ree, and art historian Fredrik B. Wallem years before the fire. This record was essential to the successful restoration of the manor.

While the title for the manor was transferred to the Norwegian state in 1919, land was retained by Simen Landet. Following his death in 1935, his property passed to Ørland municipality. The municipality sold the land to the county in 1947, with the thought that the farm would be an agricultural school. This was not realized, and in 1985 the land was sold back to the Ørland municipality. The Ørland council now owns what is left of the soil property, approximately 1,500 hectares.

The Austrått Madonna from 1220 was split in two during the salvage, but was successfully restored. The new figures in the courtyard were carved from 1953 to 1956 by Oscar Lynum, Knut Skinnarland, Kristofer Leirdalen and Tone Thiis Schjitne.

The manor is currently owned by the Norwegian state and is managed by the Nordenfjeldske Kunstindustrimuseum. The manor house is open for guided tours from June to August.

The church is still used for worship and other religious activities in the summer. It is particularly popular as a location for weddings. The knight's hall is used for concerts in summer, and for secular coming-of-age ceremonies.

== Literature ==
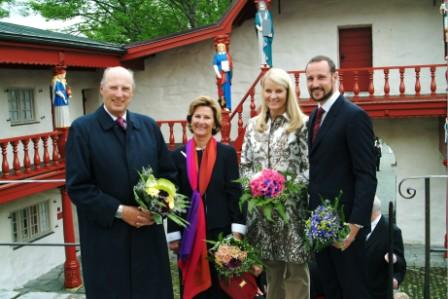
The Norwegian royal family in the courtyard at the head of the stairs to the lower courtyard during a visit 1 July 2006.

- Andersen, Håkon A. (1992). Austrått. NKIM. ISBN 82-90502-11-7.
- Andersen, Håkon A.; Bratberg, Terje (2006). Austrått, herregård i tusen år. NKIM.
- Borch, Anka (1951). Jomfru Birgit. Damm. ISBN 82-91745-00-5.
- Hauge, Yngvar (1964). Arven fra Østråt. Aschehoug.
- Hosar, Hans P. (1980). Herre og tenarar på Jens Bjelkes gods i Fosen på 1600-talet. Årbok for Fosen.
- Hosar, Hans P. (1981). Herre og bønder på Jens Bjelkes adelsgods kring midten av 1600-talet, ein studie i føydal utbytting i Norge. Oslo: Hovudoppgåve i historie, Univ. i Oslo.
- Johansen, O. J. (1928). Norge i det 17de århundre og slekten Bjelke til Østråt.
- Nielsen, Yngvar (1872). Jens Bjelke til Østråt, Norges riges kantsler. Kristiania.
- Harboe Ree, Lorentz; Wallem, Fredrik B. (1916). Østraat. Revir. ISBN 978-82-91745-05-3.
- Solberg, Stein-Arne (1973). Austråttbrannen i 1916 I: På leit etter liner..., glimt fra Ørlands historie.
- Swensen, Wilhelm (1961). Austråt. Trondheim.
