= Skredshol =

Village in Ringsaker Municipality, Norway

- Farm
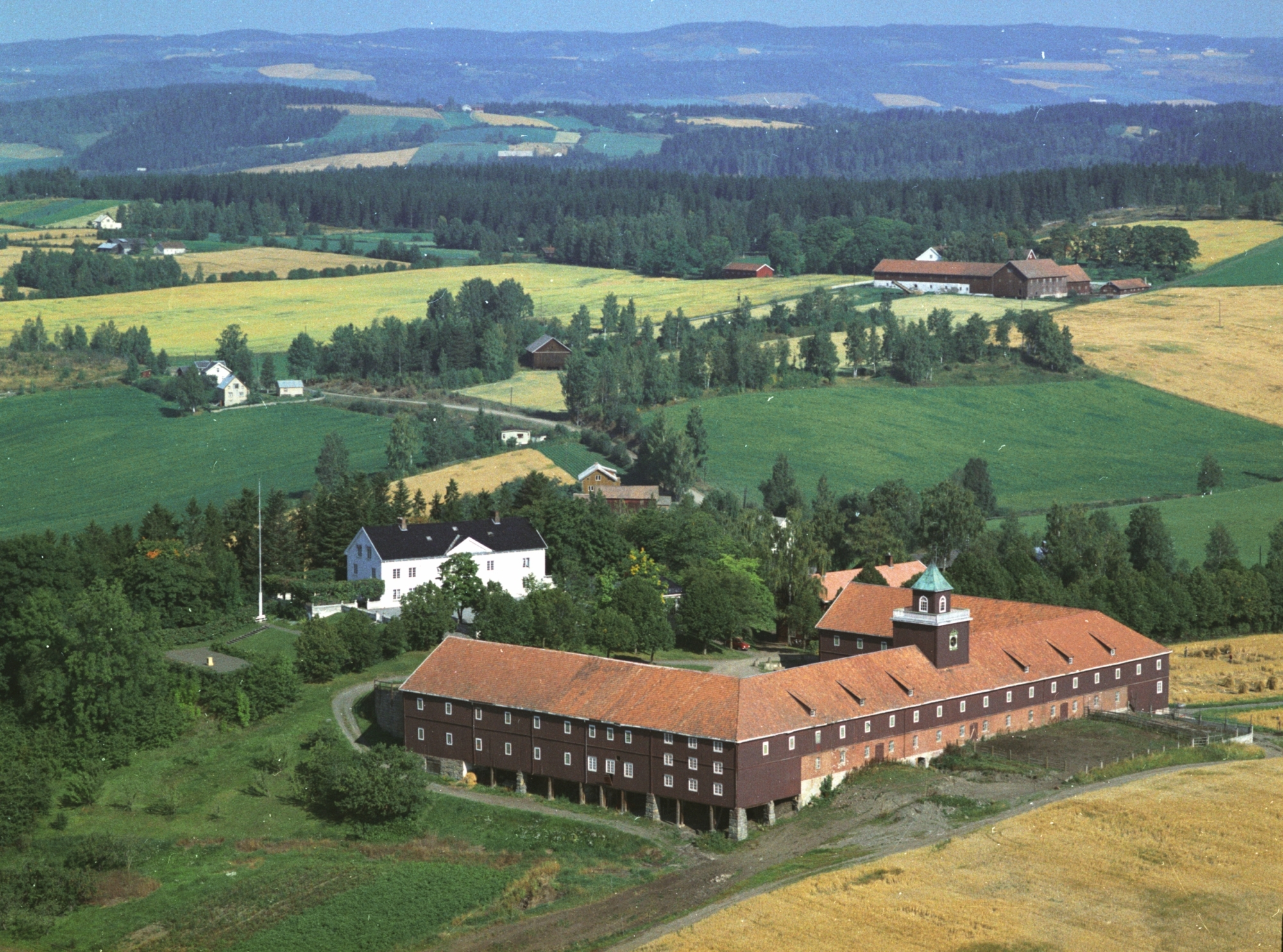
- View of the farm
- Interactive map of Skredshol
- Location within Innlandet Location within Norway
- Coordinates: 60.84772°N 10.77389°E
- Country: Norway
- Region: Eastern Norway
- County: Innlandet
- District: Hedmarken
- Municipality: Ringsaker Municipality
- Elevation: 246 m (807 ft)
- Time zone: UTC+01:00 (CET)
  - Summer (DST): UTC+02:00 (CEST)
- Post Code: 2355 Gaupen

Skredshol is a large farm located in Ringsaker Municipality in Innlandet county, Norway. It lies on the Nes peninsula which extends into Mjøsa, Norway's largest lake. The farm was once a noble-seat farm (setegård). The farm's main building is protected as a historically significant residence. The farm had a total area of 202.6 hectares (501 acres), with 73.3 hectares (181 acres) used for farming and 94 hectares (230 acres) for forestry.

== History ==
Historically, as a setegård, it was exempt from taxes and tithe. It was first mentioned in existing historical records in 1403. The farm was owned by Norway’s Reich Chancellor Jens Bjelke and subsequently by his son, Jørgen Bjelke. In 1682, Skredshol was sold by Jørgen Bjelke (then Deputy Governor-General of Norway, a Lieutenant General in the Norwegian Army, and sheriff for Bratsberg) to his brother-in-law, Hans von Løwenhielm. Two years later, Caspar Christopher Brockenhuus became the owner. Since Brockenhuus was married to the daughter of Løwenhielm he received Skredshol farm and Hovinsholm farm as gifts from his father-in-law. Brockenhuus, who was colonel in the Oppland Infantry Regiment, had previously purchased Tjerne farm from Jørgen Bjelke; so from the 1680s Brockenhuus owned these three major Hedmark farms.

In 1922, the Moslet family took over the ownership of the farm.
