= Rein Abbey, Norway =

Coordinates: 63°33′40″N 9°56′00″E

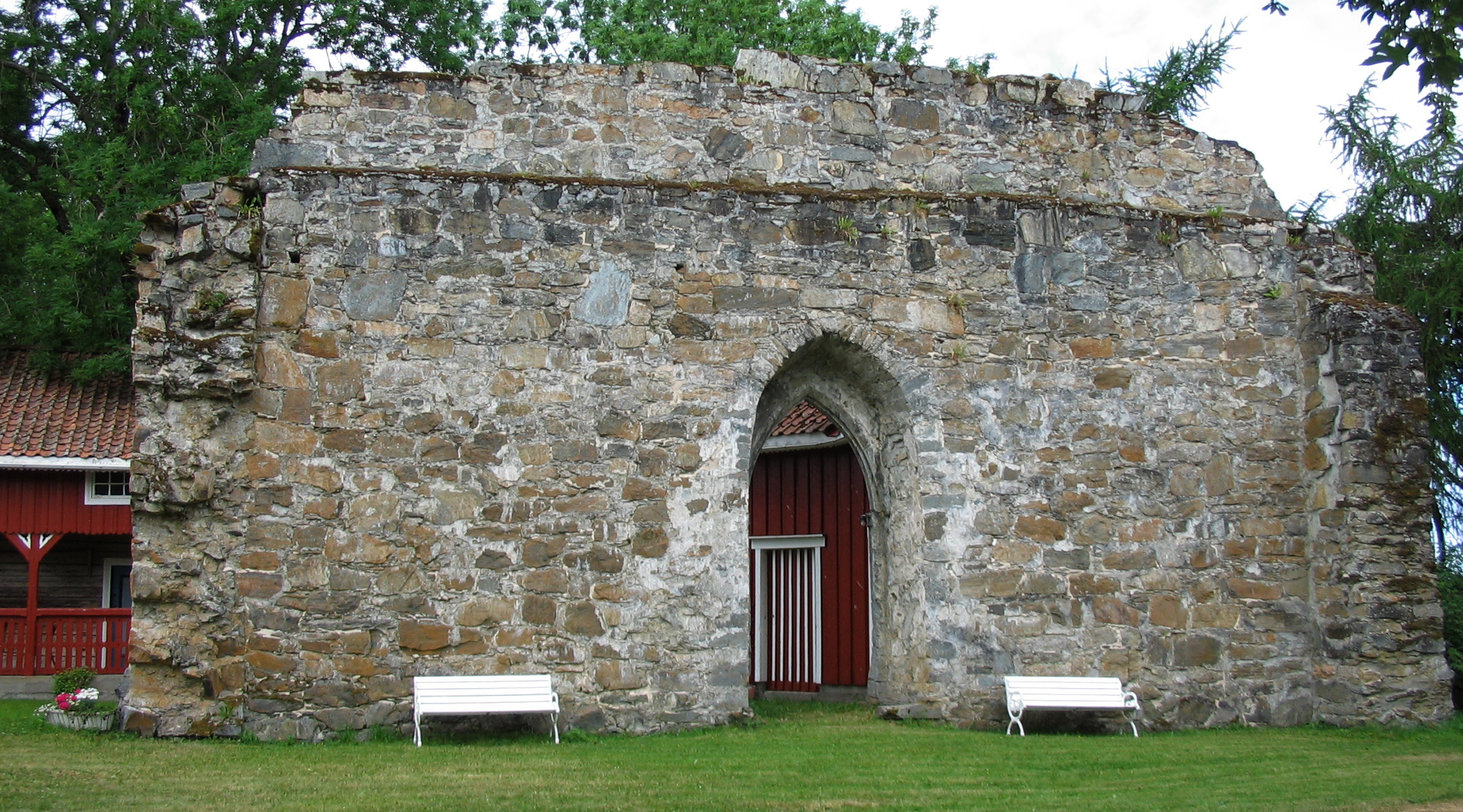
Rein Abbey ruins

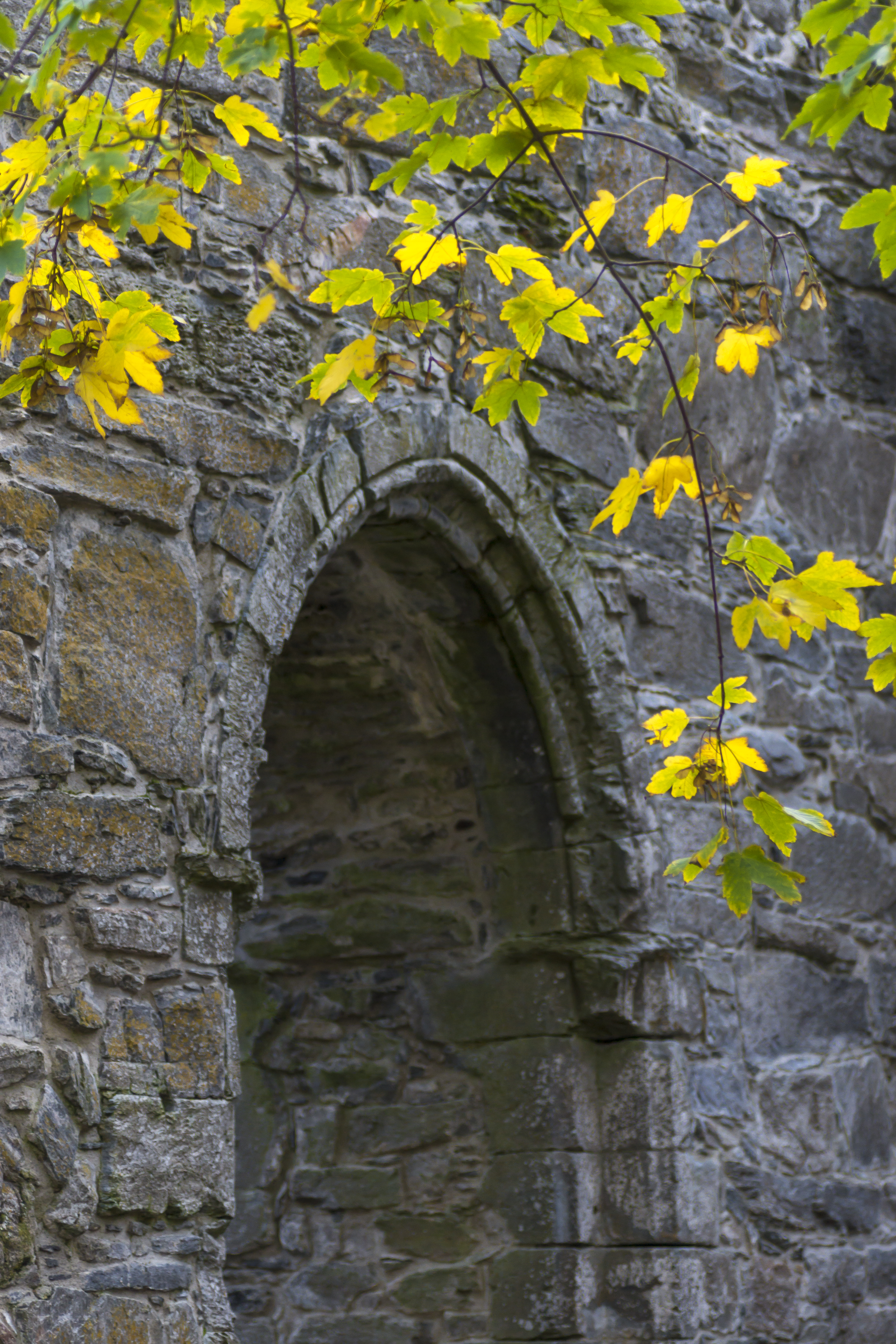
Archway at Rein Abbey ruins

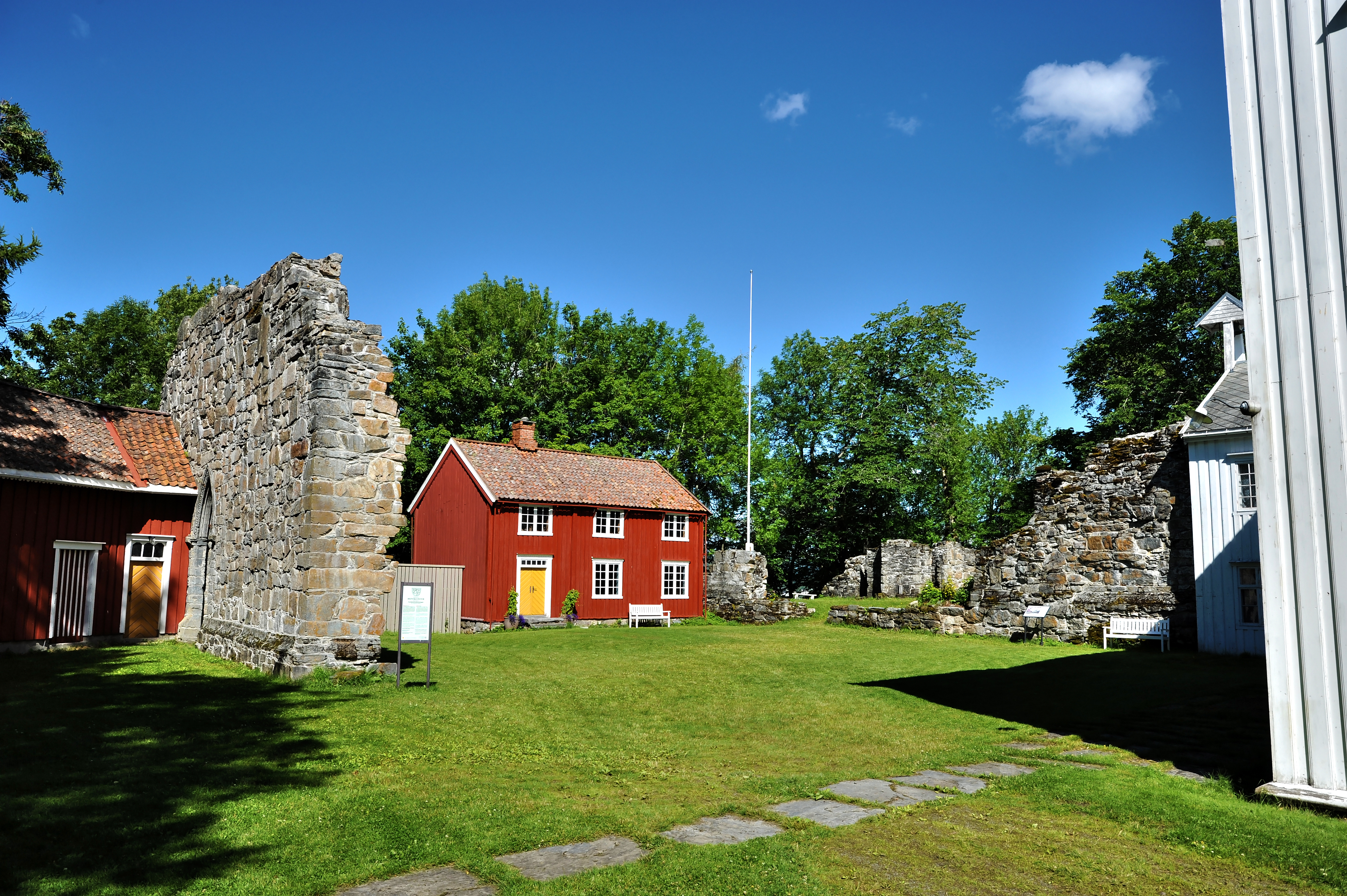
Rein Abbey

Rein Abbey (Norwegian: Rein kloster) was a Roman Catholic religious house for women located in Rissa on the Fosen peninsula to the northwest of Trondheim in Trøndelag, Norway.

== History ==
Rein Abbey was founded in or shortly after 1226. It was built on a prominent elevation in an otherwise flat landscape on the ancestral estate of Duke Skule Bårdsson, possibly in fulfilment of a vow after his recovery from an illness. It was dedicated to Saint Andrew. The first abbess was Duke Skule's half-sister, Sigrid Bårdsdatter. His daughter, Queen Margret of Norway, wife of King Håkon Håkonsson, spent her last years there. Many other women of the aristocracy also entered it.

There is no definite information on what order it belonged to, but it may well have followed the Rule of St. Augustine. It seems to have been a collegiate foundation, or community of secular canonesses, for noblewomen. The buildings were struck by lightning and burnt down in 1317, but quickly repaired.

=== Dissolution ===
During the Reformation, the abbey was dissolved and its assets taken over by the Crown. In 1531 the powerful and wealthy Ingerd Ottesdatter Rømer, otherwise Ingrid til Austrått, a leader of the Norwegian aristocracy, had herself elected administrator of the abbey. She was thus able to protect the remaining members of the community, as well as acquiring the abbey's estates, which continued in the possession of her descendants. Since 1704, the estate has been associated with the family of Trondheim merchant, Henrik Hornemann (1644-1716).

== Abbey ruins ==
Some remains of the abbey structures are still to be seen among later buildings. The site has only once been investigated archaeologically, in 1861. The former abbey is protected by the Norwegian Directorate for Cultural Heritage (Riksantikvaren).

== Literary reference ==
In the trilogy Kristin Lavransdatter written by Nobel laureate Sigrid Undset, the eponymous heroine spends her final years as a corrodian in Rein Abbey at the time of Black Death in Norway 1349.
