= List of Christian monasteries in Norway =

This is a list of Christian religious houses, both extant and dissolved, in Norway, for both men and women. All those before the Reformation were of course Catholic; the modern ones are a mixture of Catholic and Protestant communities.

== Norwegian monasteries pre-Reformation ==
All Norway's medieval religious houses that were still extant were dissolved during the Reformation.

Religious house	Location	Present-day county	Dedication	Order	Notes
Bakke Abbey	Trondheim, Bakke gård	Trøndelag		nuns of unknown order, possibly Benedictine	c. 1150 - 1537
Franciscan friary, Bergen	Bergen	Vestland		Franciscan friars	1240s - 1537
Hospital of St. Anthony, Bergen	Bergen	Vestland	Saint Anthony	Order of St. Anthony	1507–1528; the premises were previously Nonneseter Abbey, Bergen
St. John's Priory, Bergen (Jonsklosteret)	Bergen	Vestland	Saint John the Baptist	Augustinian Canons	mid-12th cy - 1450
Dragsmark Abbey (Marieskog)	Uddevalla	Båhuslen (now Bohuslän in Sweden)	Blessed Virgin Mary	Premonstratensian Canons	1230 x 1260 - 1532
Elgeseter Priory, formerly Helgeseter Priory	Trondheim	Trøndelag		Augustinian Canons	before 1183 - 1546
Gimsøy Abbey	Skien	Telemark		Benedictine nuns	1st half of the 12th cy - c. 1540
Halsnøy Abbey	Island of Halsnøya (Kvinnherad)	Vestland		Augustinian Canons	1163/64 - 1536
St. Olav's Priory, Hamar (Olavsklosteret på Hamar)	Hamar	Innlandet	Saint Olav	Dominican friars	The existence of this Dominican priory is known from a single reference in 1511
Holmen Priory	Holmen, Bergen	Vestland		Dominican friars	1243 x 1247 - 1528
Hovedøya Abbey	Island of Hovedøya (Oslo)	Oslo	Blessed Virgin Mary and Saint Edmund the Martyr	Cistercian monks	1147-1532
Kastelle Priory	Konghelle (later Kungahålla)	Båhuslen (now Bohuslän in Sweden)		Augustinian Canons	1161 x 1181 - 1529
Konghelle Friary	Konghelle (later Kungahålla)	Båhuslen (now Bohuslän in Sweden)		Franciscan friars	1263 x 1272 - 1532
Lyse Abbey	Os	Vestland		Cistercian monks	1146-1536
Marstrand Friary	Marstrand	Båhuslen (now Bohuslän in Sweden)		Franciscan friars	in existence by 1291; entirely demolished in 1532; exact location unknown
Munkeby Abbey	Okkenhaug, Levanger	Trøndelag		Cistercian monks	founded before 1180; apparently relocated to Tautra Abbey c. 1200 x 1207
Munkeliv Abbey	Nordnes, Bergen	Vestland	Saint Michael	Benedictine monks to 1426, thereafter Bridgettine nuns	c. 1110 - 1531
Nidarholm Abbey	Munkholmen island in Trondheim	Trøndelag	Saint Benedict and Saint Lawrence	Benedictine monks	c. 1100 - 1537
Nonneseter Abbey, Bergen	Bergen	Vestland	Blessed Virgin Mary	Cistercian nuns, ejected in 1507; premises given to the Hospital Brothers of St. Anthony	c. 1150[?] - 1507
Nonneseter Abbey, Oslo	Schweigaardsgaten and Grønlandsleiret in Oslo	Oslo	Blessed Virgin Mary	Benedictine nuns	early 12th cy - 1547
St. Olav's Priory, Oslo (Olavsklosteret i Oslo)	Oslo	Oslo	Saint Olav	Dominican friars	1239[?] - before 1546
Franciscan Friary, Oslo	Oslo	Oslo		Franciscan friars	before 1291 - 1530s or 1540s
Rein Abbey	Årnset, Rissa	Trøndelag	Saint Andrew	noblewomen's collegiate foundation	shortly after 1226 - 1532
Selje Abbey	Island of Selja in Selje	Vestland	Saint Alban	Benedictine monks	c. 1100 - 1461 x 1474
St. Olav's Abbey, Stavanger (Olavsklosteret i Stavanger)	Stavanger	Rogaland	Saint Olav	Augustinian Canons	founded before 1160; transferred to Utstein c. 1263 x 1280
Tautra Abbey or Tuterø Abbey	Island of Tautra, Frosta	Trøndelag		Cistercian monks	1207 - 1532
St. Olav's Abbey, Tønsberg (Olavsklosteret i Tønsberg)	Tønsberg	Vestfold	Saint Olav	Premonstratensians	2nd half of the 12th century (before 1191) - 1532
Franciscan Friary, Tønsberg	Tønsberg	Vestfold		Franciscan friars	before 1236 - 1536
Bridgettine Priory, Trondheim	Trondheim	Trøndelag		Bridgettine nuns	dates tbe
Dominican Priory, Trondheim	Trondheim	Trøndelag		Dominican friars	before 1234 - 1531
Franciscan Friary, Trondheim	Trondheim	Trøndelag		Franciscan friars	before 1472 - 1532
Utstein Abbey	Island of Mosterøy in Rennesøy	Rogaland	Saint Lawrence	Augustinian Canons	founded 1263 x 1280 to replace St. Olav's Abbey, Stavanger; dissolved 1537
Varna Abbey	Værne gård, Rygge	Østfold		Knights Hospitallers	2nd half of the 12th century - 1532

== Norwegian monasteries post-Reformation ==
All of the following are less than thirty years old.

- Engen Community, Kolbu in Toten: Protestant deaconesses, of the French Communauté des Diaconesses de Reuilly
- Fjordenes Dronning Abbey, Storfjord near Stamsund in Lofoten: Cistercian monks
- Heimdal Abbey: Bridgettines
- Hovin in Telemark: Trappist monks
- Høysteinane Priory, Larvik: Poor Clares
- Lunden Convent, Linderud, Oslo: Dominican sisters
- St. Dominic's Convent, Oslo: Dominican sisters
- St. Hallvard's Church and Monastery, Enerhaugen, Oslo: Franciscan friars
- Tautra Abbey (Tautra Mariakloster), Tautra: Trappist nuns
- Totus Tuus Convent, Tromsø: Carmelite sisters

== Sources ==
- Norske middelalderkloster (in Norwegian)
