= Slavic piracy =

Slavic piracy may refer to:

- Baltic Slavic piracy
- Neretva pirates
- Uskoci
- Cossack piracy
