= Slavic raid on Kungahälla =

- Part of the Baltic Slavic piracy
Date	10–12 August 1135
Location	Kungahälla, Kingdom of Norway (modern-day Kungälv, Sweden)
Result	Pomeranian victory

Belligerents
Slavic Pomeranians	Kingdom of Norway

Commanders and leaders
Ratibor I	Unknown

Strength
1,000–1,500; 50–70 boats	200 (Reinforcements)

Casualties and losses
Unknown	Many killed Thousands enslaved

The Slavic raid on Kungahälla or the Battle of Kungahälla targeted the Norwegian port city of Kungahälla, conducted by the Pomeranians of the Duchy of Pomerania under Ratibor I against the Kingdom of Norway, on 10–12 August 1135.

== Prelude ==
In the 12th century, Kungahälla had a prestigious status, being an important Norwegian strategic center. The date of when the Pomeranian raid took place is unclear, but is believed to have occurred in either 1135 or 1136. Snorri Sturluson places the date of this raid on 10 August 1135. Other Slavic people that took part in the raid were likely from Rani tribe of the Rügen region.

Older sources estimate the Pomeranian strength during expedition at 24,400 raiders, 1,000 horses and 550 boats. Some sources even put it as high as 30,000 raiders and 650–750 boats. These are considered to be exaggerated estimates, with actual force during the raid likely consisting of 1,000–1,500 raiders and 50–70 boats.

The motives behind the raid are unknown. Snorri doesn't mention the motive either. Some historians attempted to link it to the orders given by Kingdom of Poland, but this version is unlikely to be the case. The raid was likely undertaken with desire for profit, taking advantage of Norwegian internal turmoil during this period.

== Raid ==
The raid was begun by Ratibor I. Slavic raiders sailed from Pomerania, possibly from Rügen island. Sailing to the Kungahälla likely took 4–5 days. Snorri states that inhabitants of the city were warned prior about the incoming raiders. The raiders carried out sorties on Kungahälla through the Göta älv. Part of raiders on the Eastern side, Ratibor's force on the Western side, while others landed on ground. The raiders set nine merchant ships on fire and plundered surroundings. Out of Skurbagar town, 200 Norwegian troops attempted to stop the raiders, but were repulsed.

The siege of Kungahälla likely lasted until 12 August, with Ratibor I promising mercy to Kungahälla garrison if they surrendered. However, Slavic raiders broke their promise. They plundered the city, massacred the inhabitants "unfit for labour", and took the rest into slavery to Slavic lands.

== Aftermath ==
According to Snorri Sturluson, the raid left irrecoverable damage on Kungahälla. Thousands were enslaved by the Slavic raiders during the raid. At the same time, this raid became one of the last major victories for Pomeranians. In 1136, Eric II of Denmark raided Rügen. This was claimed to be the "revenge for Kungahälla", but Zaroff claims that's unlikely to be the case. Eric's motive was to convert Slavic pagans to Christianity, since his raid was aimed at a religious site. Slavs negotiated with Danes, but didn't follow the agreement and continued their pagan practices after Danish withdrew.

== See also ==
- Baltic slave trade

== Bibliography ==
- Barkowski, Robert F. (2021). Konungahella 1135 (in Polish) (1 ed.). Bellona. ISBN 978-8311158764.
- Gaca, Andrzej (2020). "Baltic Slavs fighting at sea from the ninth to twelfth century. The phenomenon of over a hundred years of Slavic domination over the Baltic Sea". Studia Iuridica Toruniensia. 24: 51. doi:10.12775/SIT.2019.003.
- Zaroff, Roman (2014-01-01). "Slavic Raid on Konungahella". Collegium Medievale. 27. Novus forlag. ISSN 0801-9282.
