= Slavs =

Grouping of people

Total population
- c. 300 million (2014); See § Population

Regions with significant populations
- Central Europe (West Slavs); Southeast Europe (South Slavs); Eastern Europe, Northern Asia, and Central Asia (East Slavs)

Languages
- Slavic languages, local sign languages

Religion
- Mostly Christianity (Eastern Orthodoxy · Roman Catholicism · Protestantism · Spiritual Christianity); Minorities: Irreligious · Islam · Judaism · Slavic paganism (neo-paganism)

Related ethnic groups
- Other Indo-European-peoples, especially Balts

The Slavs or Slavic people are groups of people who speak Slavic languages. Slavs are geographically distributed throughout regions of Eurasia; they predominantly inhabit Central Europe, Eastern Europe, Southeastern Europe, and Northern Asia, though there is a large Slavic minority scattered across the Baltic states and Central Asia, and a substantial Slavic diaspora in the Americas, Western Europe, and Northern Europe.

Contemporary map of the Slavic speaking countries of Europe. West Slavic countries East Slavic countries South Slavic countries

Early Slavs lived during the Migration Period and the Early Middle Ages (approximately from the 5th to the 10th century AD), and came to control large parts of Central, Eastern, and Southeast Europe between the sixth and seventh centuries. Beginning in the 7th century, they were gradually Christianized. By the 12th century, they formed the core population of a number of medieval Christian states: East Slavs in the Kievan Rus', South Slavs in the Bulgarian Empire, the Principality of Serbia, the Duchy of Croatia and the Banate of Bosnia, and West Slavs in the Principality of Nitra, Great Moravia, the Duchy of Bohemia, and the Kingdom of Poland.

Beginning in the mid-19th century, a pan-Slavic movement has emphasized the common heritage and unity of all the Slavic peoples. The movement was particularly influential in the Balkans. While the Russian Empire’s stance toward the movement was complex and sometimes cautious, many Pan-Slavists looked to Russia for support rather than viewing it as an outright opponent.

The Slavic languages belong to the Balto-Slavic branch of the Indo-European language family. Present-day Slavs are classified into three groups:

- West Slavs (Czechs, Kashubians, Moravians, Poles, Silesians, Slovaks, and Sorbs);
- East Slavs (Belarusians, Russians, Rusyns, and Ukrainians);
- South Slavs (Bosniaks, Bulgarians, Croats, Gorani, Macedonians, Montenegrins, Pomaks, Serbs, Slovenes and Torbeši).

Though the majority of Slavs are Christians, some groups, such as the Bosniaks, mostly identify as Muslims. Modern Slavic nations and ethnic groups are considerably diverse, both genetically and culturally, and relations between them may range from "ethnic solidarity to mutual feelings of hostility" — even within the individual groups.

== Ethnonym ==
The oldest mention of the Slavic ethnonym is from the 6th century AD, when Procopius, writing in Byzantine Greek, used various forms such as Sklaboi (Σκλάβοι), Sklabēnoi (Σκλαβηνοί), Sklauenoi (Σκλαυηνοί), Sthlabenoi (Σθλαβηνοί), or Sklabinoi (Σκλαβῖνοι), and his contemporary Jordanes refers to the Sclaveni in Latin. The oldest documents written in Old Church Slavonic, dating from the 9th century, attest the autonym as Slověne (Словѣне). Those forms point back to a Slavic autonym, which can be reconstructed in Proto-Slavic as *Slověninъ, plural Slověne.

The reconstructed autonym *Slověninъ is usually considered a derivation from slovo ("word"), originally denoting "people who speak (the same language)", meaning "people who understand one another", in contrast to the Slavic word denoting "German people", namely *němьcь, meaning "silent, mute people" (from Slavic *němъ "mute, mumbling"). The word slovo ("word") and the related slava ("glory, fame") and sluh ("hearing") originate from the Proto-Indo-European root *ḱlew- ("be spoken of, glory"), cognate with Ancient Greek κλέος (kléos "fame"), as in the name Pericles, Latin clueō ("be called"), and English loud.

In medieval and early modern sources written in Latin, Slavs are most commonly referred to as Sclaveni or the shortened version Sclavi.

== History ==
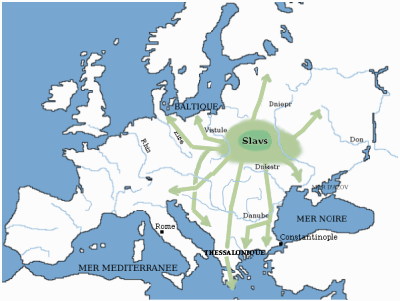
The origin and migration of Slavs in Europe between the 5th and 10th centuries AD: Slavic urheimat within Polesia (modern-day southern Belarus, northern Ukraine, and eastern Poland) Expansion of the Slavic migration in Europe

=== Origins ===
==== First mentions ====
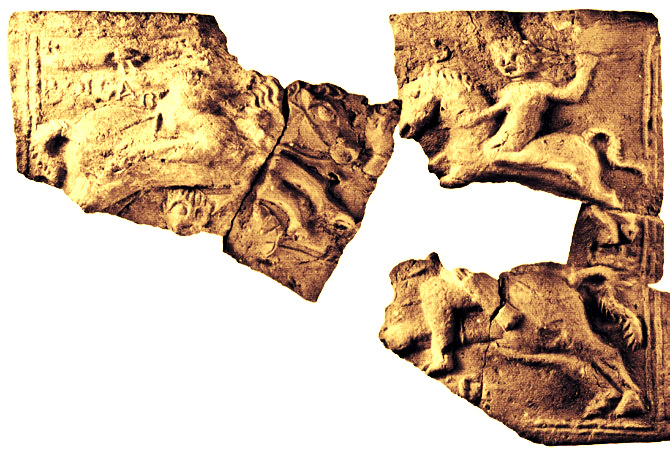
Terracotta tile from the 6th–7th century AD found in Vinica, North Macedonia, depicting a battle scene between the Bulgars and Slavs, with the Latin inscription BOLGAR and SCLAVIGI

Ancient Roman sources refer to the Early Slavic peoples as "Veneti", who dwelt in a region of central Europe east of the Germanic tribe of Suebi and west of the Iranian Sarmatians in the 1st and 2nd centuries AD, between the upper Vistula and Dnieper rivers. Slavs – called Antes and Sclaveni – first appear in Byzantine records in the early 6th century AD. Byzantine historiographers of the era of the emperor Justinian I (r. 527–565), such as Procopius of Caesarea, Jordanes and Theophylact Simocatta, describe tribes of these names emerging from the area of the Carpathian Mountains, the lower Danube and the Black Sea to invade the Danubian provinces of the Eastern Empire.

Jordanes, in his work Getica (written in 551 AD), describes the Veneti as a "populous nation" whose dwellings begin at the sources of the Vistula and occupy "a great expanse of land". He also describes the Veneti as the ancestors of Antes and Slaveni, two early Slavic tribes, who appeared on the Byzantine frontier in the early-6th century.

Procopius wrote in 545 that "the Sclaveni and the Antae actually had a single name in the remote past; for they were both called Sporoi in olden times". The name Sporoi derives from Greek σπείρω ("to sow"). He described them as barbarians, who lived under democracy and believed in one god, "the maker of lightning" (Perun), to whom they made sacrifice. They lived in scattered housing and constantly changed settlement. In war, they were mainly foot soldiers with shields, spears, bows, and little armour, which was reserved mainly for chiefs and their inner circle of warriors. Their language is "barbarous" (that is, not Greek), and the two tribes are alike in appearance, being tall and robust, "while their bodies and hair are neither very fair or blond, nor indeed do they incline entirely to the dark type, but they are all slightly ruddy in color. And they live a hard life, giving no heed to bodily comforts..."

Jordanes describes the Sclaveni as having swamps and forests for their cities. Another 6th-century source refers to them living among nearly-impenetrable forests, rivers, lakes, and marshes.

Menander Protector mentions Daurentius (r. c. 577 – 579) who slew an Avar envoy of Khagan Bayan I for asking the Slavs to accept the suzerainty of the Avars; Daurentius declined and is reported as saying: "Others do not conquer our land, we conquer theirs – so it shall always be for us as long as there are wars and weapons".

==== Migrations ====
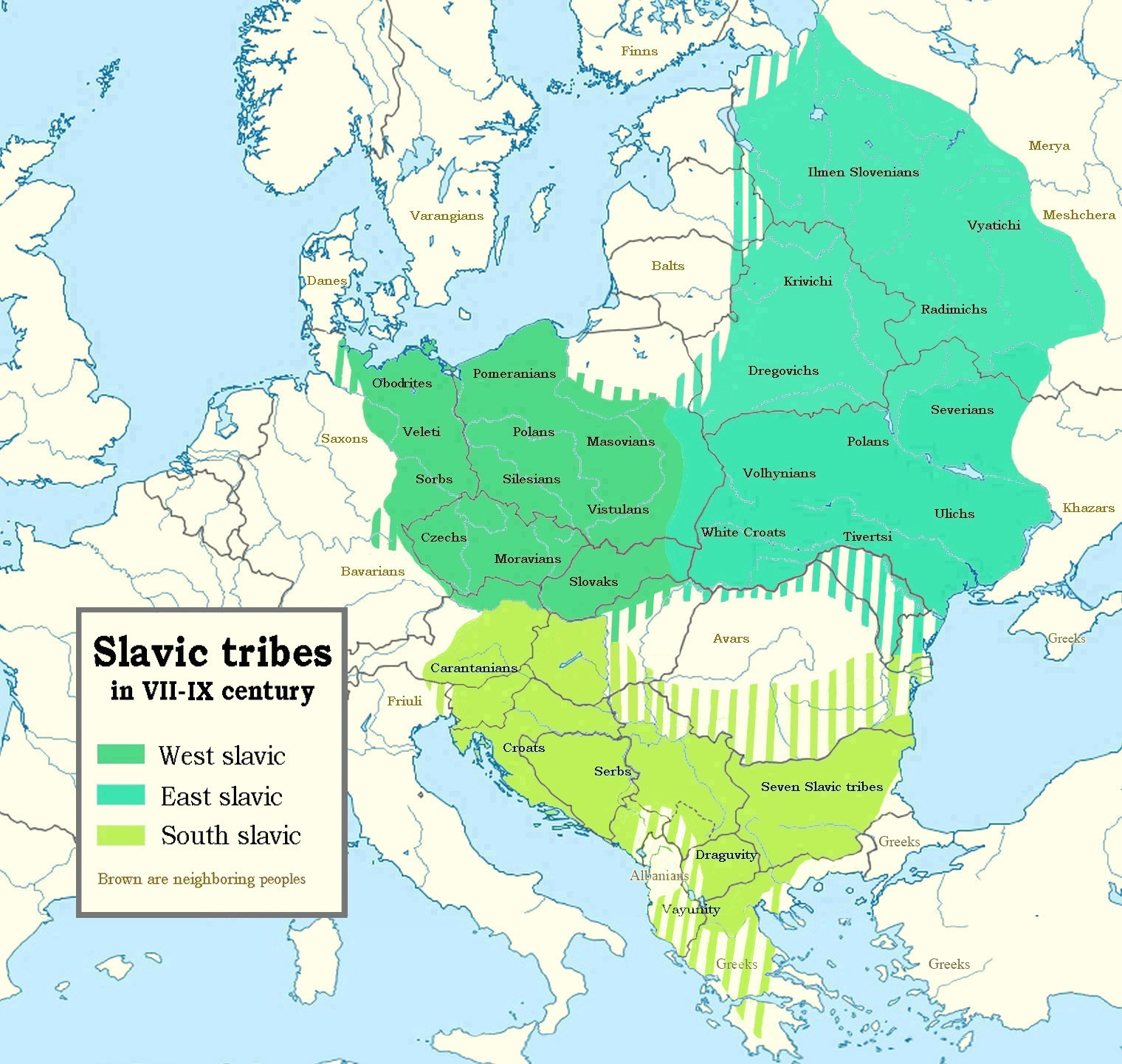
Slavic tribes from the 7th to 9th centuries AD in Europe

The Slavs emerged from obscurity when the westward movement of Germanic tribes in the 5th and 6th centuries AD (thought to be in conjunction with the movement of peoples from Siberia and Eastern Europe: Huns, and later Avars and Bulgars) started the great migration of the Slavs, who settled the lands abandoned by Germanic tribes who had fled from the Huns and their allies. Slavs, according to this account, moved westward into the country between the Oder and the Elbe-Saale line; southward into Bohemia, Moravia, much of present-day Austria, the Pannonian plain and the Balkans; and northward along the upper Dnieper river. It has also been suggested that some Slavs migrated with the Vandals to the Iberian Peninsula and even to North Africa.

Around the 6th century, Slavs appeared on Byzantine borders in large numbers. Byzantine records note that Slav numbers were so great, that grass would not regrow where the Slavs had marched through. Military movements resulted in even the Peloponnese and Anatolia being reported to have Slavic settlements. This southern movement has traditionally been seen as an invasive expansion. By the end of the 6th century, Slavs had settled the Eastern Alps regions.

Pope Gregory I in 600 AD wrote to Maximus, the bishop of Salona (in Dalmatia), expressing concern about the arrival of the Slavs,

Latin: Et quidem de Sclavorum gente, quae vobis valde imminet, et affligor vehementer et conturbor. Affligor in his quae jam in vobis patior; conturbor, quia per Istriae aditum jam ad Italiam intrare coeperunt.

English: I am both distressed and disturbed about the Slavs, who are pressing hard on you. I am distressed because I sympathize with you; I am disturbed because they have already begun to arrive in Italy through the entry-point of Istria.

=== Middle Ages ===
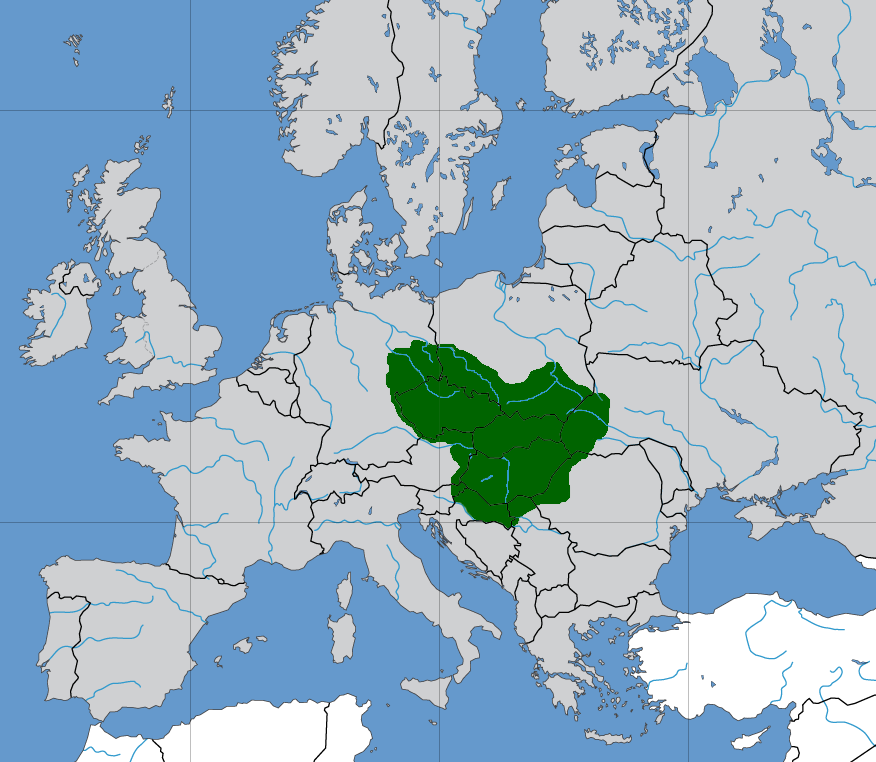
Great Moravia during Svatopluk I (r. 871–894), according to Štefanovičová (1989)

When Slav migrations ended, their first state organizations appeared, each headed by a prince with a treasury and a defense force. In the 7th century, the Frankish merchant Samo supported the Slavs against their Avar rulers and became the ruler of the first known Slav state in Central Europe, Samo's Empire. This early Slavic polity probably did not outlive its founder and ruler, but it was the foundation for later West Slavic states on its territory.

The oldest of them was Carantania; others are the Principality of Nitra, the Moravian principality (see under Great Moravia) and the Balaton Principality. The First Bulgarian Empire was founded in 681 as an alliance between the ruling Bulgars and the numerous Slavs in the area, and their South Slavic language, the Old Church Slavonic, became the main and official language of the empire in 864 AD. Bulgaria was instrumental in the spread of Slavic literacy and Christianity to the rest of the Slavic world. Duchy of Croatia was founded in 7th century and later became Kingdom of Croatia. Principality of Serbia was founded in 8th, Duchy of Bohemia and Kievan Rus' both in the 9th century.

In the centuries that followed, a number of medieval Slavic states emerged, including the Second Bulgarian Empire, the Kingdom of Poland, the Banate of Bosnia, Duklja, and the Kingdom of Serbia, which later developed into the Serbian Empire.

=== Modern era ===
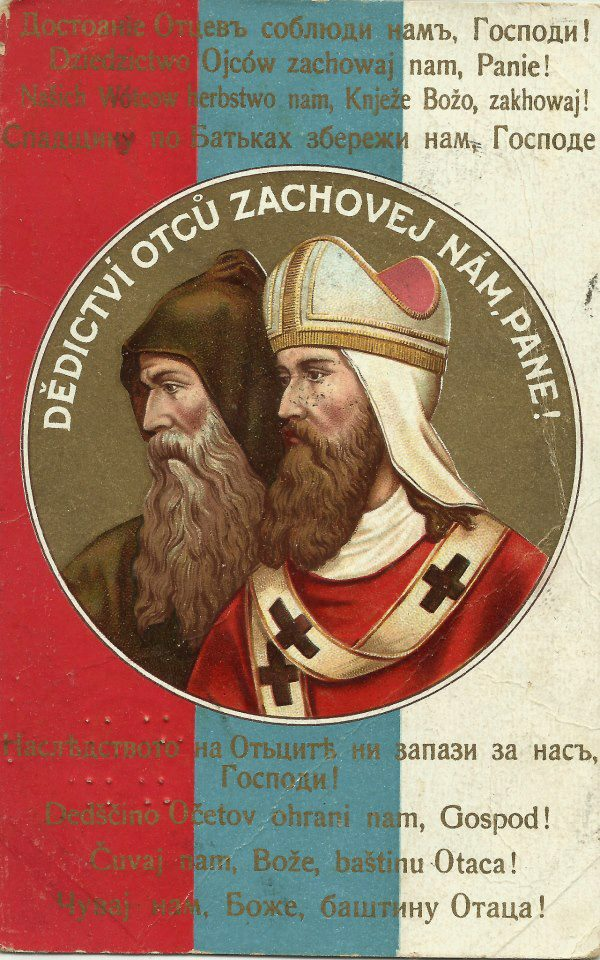
Pan-Slavic postcard depicting Cyril and Methodius, with the text "God/Our Lord, watch over our grandfatherland/ heritage" in 9 Slavic languages.

Pan-Slavism, a movement which came into prominence in the mid-19th century, emphasized the common heritage and unity of all the Slavic peoples. The main focus was in the Balkans where the South Slavs had been ruled for centuries by other empires: the Byzantine Empire, Austria-Hungary, the Ottoman Empire, and Venice. Austria-Hungary envisioned its own political concept of Austro-Slavism, in opposition of Pan-Slavism that was predominantly led by the Russian Empire.

As of 1878, there were only three majority Slavic states in the world: the Russian Empire, Principality of Serbia and Principality of Montenegro. Bulgaria was effectively independent but was de jure vassal to the Ottoman Empire until official independence was declared in 1908. The Slavic peoples who were, for the most part, denied a voice in the affairs of the Austro-Hungarian Empire, were calling for national self-determination.

During World War I, representatives of the Czechs, Slovaks, Poles, Serbs, Croats, and Slovenes set up organizations in the Allied countries to gain sympathy and recognition. In 1918, after World War I ended, the Slavs established such independent states as Czechoslovakia, the Second Polish Republic, and the Kingdom of Serbs, Croats and Slovenes.

The first half of the 20th century in Russia and the Soviet Union was marked by a succession of wars, famines and other disasters, each accompanied by large-scale population losses. The two major famines were in 1921 to 1922 and 1932 to 1933, which caused millions of deaths mostly around the Volga region, Ukraine and the Northern Caucasus. The latter resulted from Soviet leader Joseph Stalin's collectivization of agriculture in Ukraine.

During the war, Nazi Germany used hundreds of thousands of people for slave labor in their concentration camps, the majority of whom were Jewish or Slavic. Both groups were a part of what Germans claimed to be a "vast racially subhuman surplus population" that they "intended to eliminate in time from their new empire", their term for "racial subhumans" being Untermensch. Thus, one of Adolf Hitler's ambitions at the start of World War II was to exterminate, expel, or enslave most or all West and East Slavs from their native lands, so as to make "living space" for German settlers.

In early 1941, Germany began planning Generalplan Ost, the genocide of Slavs in Eastern Europe which was supposed to start after a major expansion of German concentration camps in occupied Poland and the fall of Stalin's regime. This plan was to be carried out gradually over 25 to 30 years. After an approximate 30 million Slavs would be killed through starvation and their major cities depopulated, the Germans were supposed to repopulate Eastern Europe. In June 1941, when Germany invaded the Soviet Union in Operation Barbarossa, Hitler paused the plan to focus on the extermination of the Jews. However, some of the plan was nonetheless implemented. Millions of Slavs were murdered in Eastern Europe; this includes victims of the Hunger Plan, Germany's intentional starvation of the region, as well as the murders of 3.3. million Soviet prisoners of war. Germany's Heinrich Himmler also ordered his subordinate Ludolf-Hermann von Alvensleben to start repopulating Crimea, and hundreds of ethnic Germans were forcibly moved to cities and villages there. The Soviet Red Army took back their land from the Germans in 1944. Stephen J. Lee estimates that, by the end of World War II in 1945, the Russian population was about 90 million fewer than it could have been otherwise.

The ultra-nationalist, fascist Ustaše committed genocide against Serbs during World War II. The Serbian nationalist Chetniks committed genocide against Croats and Bosniaks. Also during World War II, fascist Italy sent tens of thousands of Slavs to concentration camps in mainland Italy, Libya, and the Balkans.

In 1991, the Soviet Union collapsed, and many former Soviet republics became independent countries. Currently, former Soviet states in Central Asia such as Kazakhstan and Kyrgyzstan have very large minority Slavic populations, with most being Russians. Kazakhstan has the largest Slavic minority population.

== Languages ==
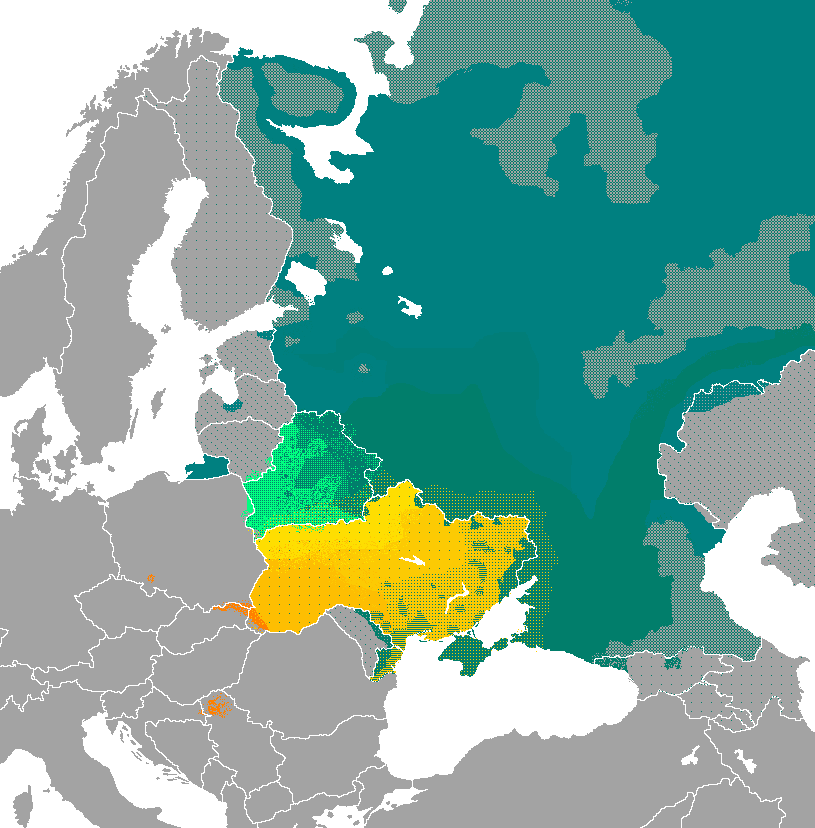
East Slavic languages Russian Belarusian Ukrainian Rusyn

South Slavic dialect continuum with major dialect groups

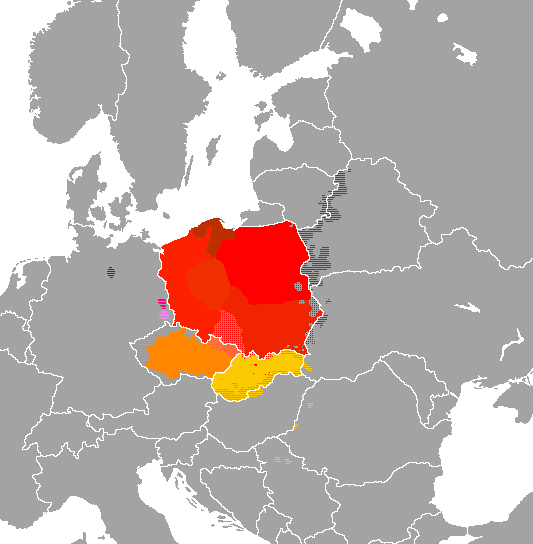
West Slavic languages Polish Kashubian Silesian dialect Polabian † Lower Sorbian Upper Sorbian Czech Slovak

Proto-Slavic, the supposed ancestor language of all Slavic languages, is a descendant of common Proto-Indo-European, via a Balto-Slavic stage in which it developed numerous lexical and morphophonological isoglosses with the Baltic languages. In the framework of the Kurgan hypothesis, "the Indo-Europeans who remained after the migrations [from the steppe] became speakers of Balto-Slavic".

Proto-Slavic is defined as the last stage of the language preceding the geographical split of the historical Slavic languages. That language was uniform, and on the basis of borrowings from foreign languages and Slavic borrowings into other languages, it cannot be said to have any recognizable dialects, which suggests that there was, at one time, a relatively-small Proto-Slavic homeland. However, from a historical and archaeological point of view, the existence of a homogeneous Proto-Slavic people is judged improbable.

Slavic linguistic unity was to some extent visible as late as Old Church Slavonic manuscripts which, though based on local Slavic speech of Thessaloniki, could still serve the purpose of the first common Slavic literary language.

Standardised Slavic languages that have official status in at least one country are: Belarusian, Bosnian, Bulgarian, Croatian, Czech, Macedonian, Montenegrin, Polish, Russian, Serbian, Slovak, Slovene, and Ukrainian. Russian is the most spoken Slavic language, and is the most spoken native language in Europe.

The alphabets used for Slavic languages are usually connected to the dominant religion among the respective ethnic groups. Orthodox Christians use the Cyrillic alphabet while Catholics use the Latin alphabet; the Bosniaks, who are Muslim, also use the Latin alphabet and Cyrillic alphabet in Serbia. Additionally, some Eastern Catholics and Western Catholics use the Cyrillic alphabet. Serbian and Montenegrin use both the Cyrillic and Latin alphabets. There is also a Latin script to write in Belarusian, called Łacinka and in Ukrainian, called Latynka.

== Ethno-cultural subdivisions ==
West Slavs originate from early Slavic tribes which settled in Central Europe after the East Germanic tribes had left this area during the migration period. They are noted as having mixed with Germans, Hungarians, Celts (particularly the Boii), Old Prussians, and the Pannonian Avars. The West Slavs came under the influence of the Western Roman Empire (Latin) and of the Catholic Church.

East Slavs have origins in early Slavic tribes who mixed and contacted with Finns, Balts and with the remnants of the people of the Goths. Their early Slavic component, Antes, mixed or absorbed Iranians, and later received influence from the Khazars and Vikings. The East Slavs trace their national origins to the tribal unions of Kievan Rus' and Rus' Khaganate, beginning in the 10th century. They came particularly under the influence of the Byzantine Empire and of the Eastern Orthodox Church.

South Slavs largely trace their origins to the migration of Slavic-speaking populations into southeastern Europe during the 6th and 7th centuries. These populations admixed with pre-existing inhabitants of the region, including descendants of ancient Balkan, Eastern Alpine and Pannonian populations, among them Romanized communities and populations with Celtic and other pre-Roman backgrounds. The region also experienced migrations of Germanic and steppe peoples during the Migration Period, including Goths, Gepids, Huns and Avars. The extent of admixture varied regionally. The Slovenes developed within the Eastern Alpine and Central European historical sphere. The early medieval history of the region was shaped by the settlement of Slavic-speaking populations, the formation of communities such as the Carantanians, and the subsequent expansion of Frankish political influence during the 8th and 9th centuries. The Croats experienced a combination of Western European and Byzantine influences, particularly along the eastern Adriatic coast. Ottoman incursions and military pressure also had significant political, social, economic and demographic consequences for Croatian territories, particularly during the second half of the 15th century. Other South Slavic populations experienced varying combinations of Byzantine, Western European and Ottoman influence. These historical developments contributed to the religious diversity of South Slavic communities, including Roman Catholicism, Eastern Orthodoxy and Islam.

== Genetics ==
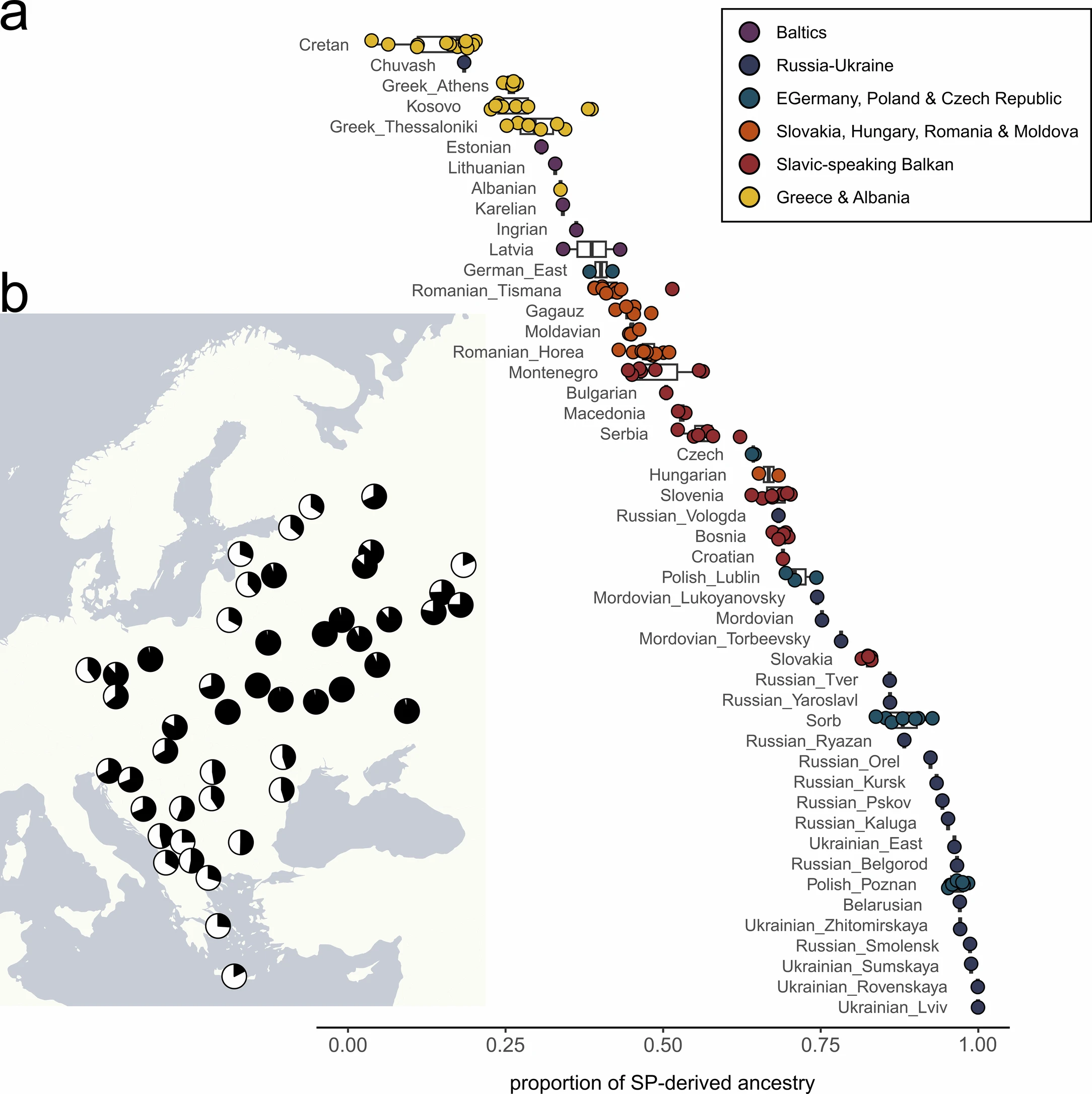
The genetic legacy of the Slavic expansion (black), per Gretzinger et al. (2025).

Consistent with the proximity of their languages, analyses of Y chromosomes, mDNA, and autosomal marker CCR5 delta 32 shows that East Slavs and West Slavs are genetically very similar, but demonstrate significant differences from neighboring Finno-Ugric, Turkic, and North Caucasian peoples. Such genetic homogeneity is somewhat unusual, given such a wide dispersal of Slavic populations. Together they form the basis of the "East European" gene cluster, which also includes non-Slavic Hungarians and Aromanians. Only Northern Russians among East and West Slavs belong to a different, "Northern European" genetic cluster, along with Balts, Germanic and Baltic Finnic peoples (Northern Russian populations are very similar to Balts).

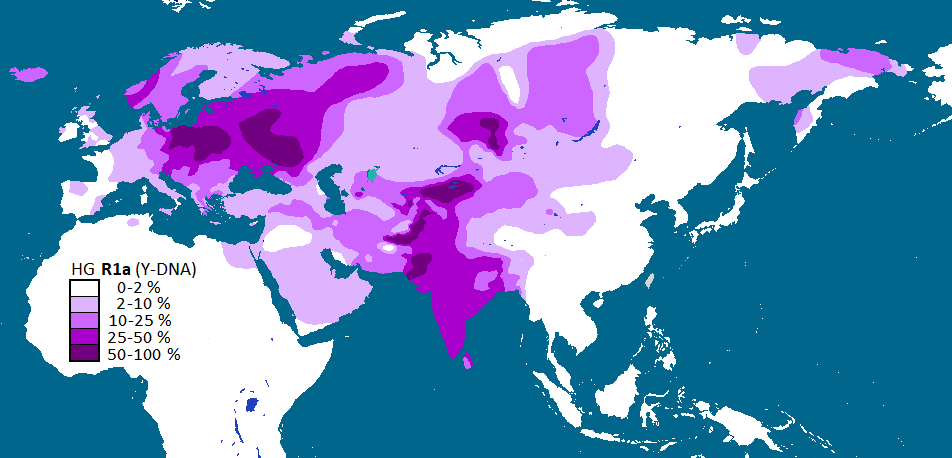
Global distribution of the R1a haplogroup, which is the most frequently found haplogroup among the Slavic peoples of Europe

The 2006 Y-DNA study results "suggest that the Slavic expansion started from the territory of present-day Ukraine, thus supporting the hypothesis placing the earliest known homeland of Slavs in the basin of the middle Dnieper". According to genetic studies until 2020, the distribution, variance and frequency of the Y-DNA haplogroups R1a and I2 and their subclades R-M558, R-M458 and I-CTS10228 among South Slavs correlate with the spread of Slavic languages during the medieval Slavic expansion from Eastern Europe, most probably from the territory of present-day Ukraine and Southeastern Poland.

According to a 2017 study, Slavic speakers like Russians, Ukrainians and Belarusians have similar genetic components. Ukrainians and Belarusians have near-equal amounts of two "European components", which are commonly found in North Europe and Caucasus respectively. There is also no evidence of Asian admixture. However, samples of Novosibirsk residents and Old Believers in Siberia have 5-10% Central Siberian ancestry despite being genetically close to European Slavs.

A 2025 comprehensive archaeogenetic study published in Nature on 555 samples out of which 359 from the Slavic period, "demonstrate large-scale population movement from Eastern Europe during the sixth to eighth centuries, replacing more than 80% of the local gene pool in Eastern Germany, Poland and Croatia" and that "on the European scale, it appears plausible that the changes in material culture and language between the sixth and eighth centuries were connected to these large-scale population movements". A Genome Biology study about South Moravia came to the same conclusion, finding "a strong genetic shift incompatible with local continuity between the fifth and seventh century, supporting the notion that the Slavic expansion in South Moravia was driven by population movement". Also, in the first 2025 study, it was considered that the "best spatial proxy" of the Slavic Urheimat was in the south of Belarus and north of Ukraine, indicative of the Kyiv culture.

== Religion ==
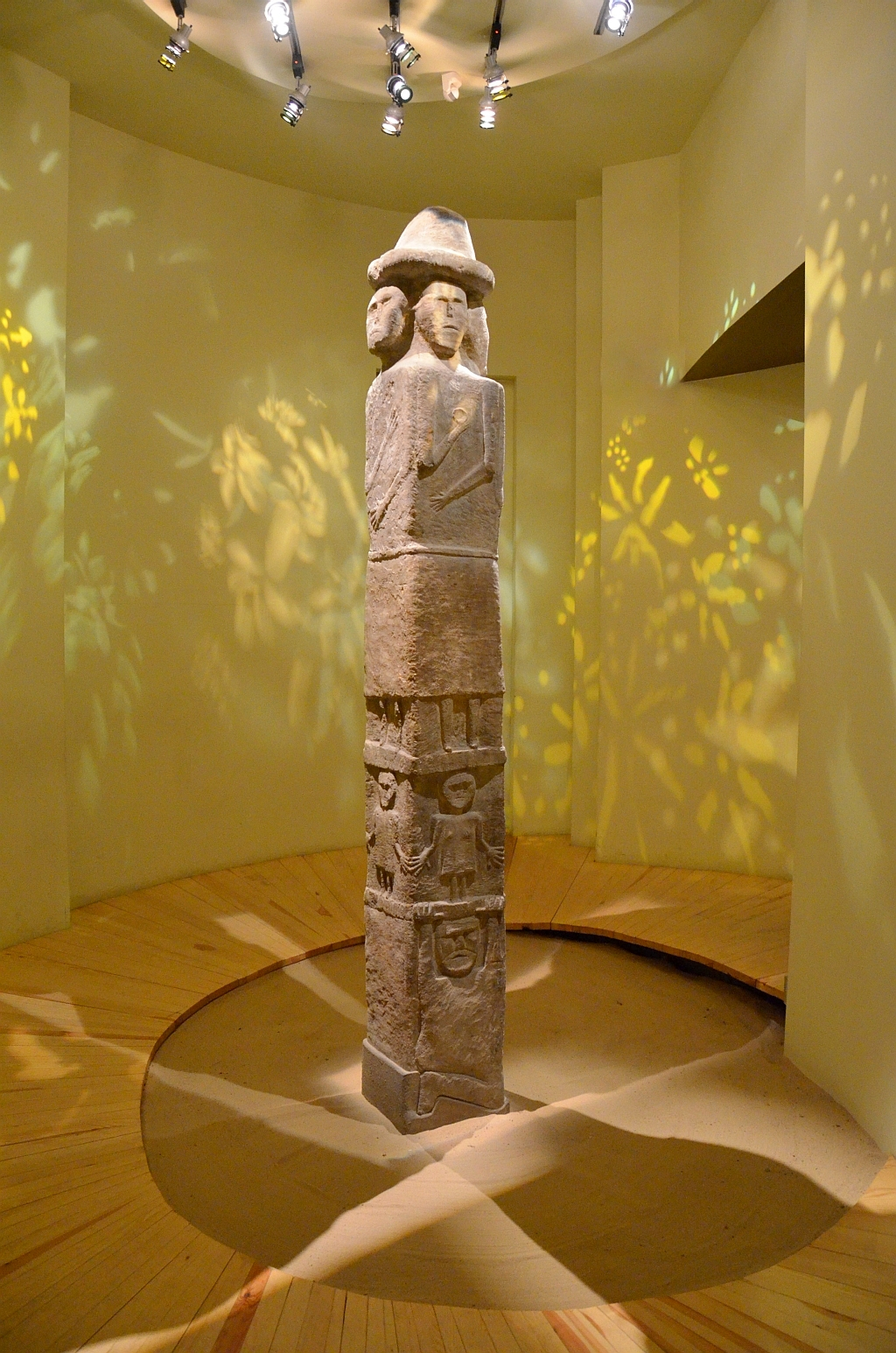
The "Zbruch Idol" preserved at the Kraków Archaeological Museum

The pagan Slavic populations were Christianized between the 7th and 12th centuries. Orthodox Christianity is predominant among East and South Slavs, while Catholicism is predominant among West Slavs and some western South Slavs. The religious borders are largely comparable to the East–West Schism which began in the 11th century. Islam first arrived in the 7th century during the early Muslim conquests, and was gradually adopted by a number of Slavic ethnic groups through the centuries in the Balkans.

Among Slavic populations who profess a religion, the majority of contemporary Christian Slavs are Orthodox, followed by Catholic. The majority of Muslim Slavs follow the Hanafi school of the Sunni branch of Islam. Religious delineations by nationality can be very sharp; usually in the Slavic ethnic groups, the vast majority of religious people share the same religion.

Mainly Eastern Orthodoxy:

- Russians
- Ukrainians
- Serbs
- Bulgarians
- Belarusians
- Macedonians
- Montenegrins

Mainly Catholicism:

- Poles
- Kashubians
- Gorals
- Czechs (largely irreligious)
- Slovaks
- Croats
- Slovenes
- Sorbs
- Rusyns (Note: Originally Eastern Orthodox, with some groups adopting Byzantine-Rite Catholicism under Polish and Austro-Hungarian rule and reverting to Eastern Orthodoxy starting in the late 19th Century.)
- Banat Bulgarians

Mainly Islam:

- Bosniaks
- Pomaks
- Gorani
- Torbeši
- Ethnic Muslims

== Relations with non-Slavic people ==
Throughout their history, Slavs came into contact with non-Slavic groups. In the postulated homeland region (present-day Ukraine), they had contacts with the Iranian Sarmatians and the Germanic Goths. After their subsequent spread, the Slavs began assimilating non-Slavic peoples. For example, in the Northern Black Sea region, the Slavs assimilated the remnants of the Goths. In the Balkans, there were Paleo-Balkan peoples, such as Romanized and Hellenized (Jireček Line) Illyrians, Thracians and Dacians, as well as Greeks and Celtic Scordisci and Serdi. Because Slavs were so numerous, most indigenous populations of the Balkans were Slavicized. Thracians and Illyrians mixed as ethnic groups in this period.

A notable exception is Greece, where Slavs were Hellenized because Greeks were more numerous, especially with more Greeks returning to Greece in the 9th century and the influence of the church and administration, however, Slavicized regions within Macedonia, Thrace and Moesia Inferior also had a larger portion of locals compared to migrating Slavs. Other notable exceptions are the territory of present-day Romania and Hungary, where Slavs settled en route to present-day Greece, North Macedonia, Bulgaria and East Thrace but assimilated, and the modern Albanian nation which claims descent from Illyrians and other Balkan tribes.

The status of the Bulgars as a ruling class and their control of the land nominally left their legacy in the Bulgarian country and people, but Bulgars were gradually also Slavicized into the present-day South Slavic ethnic group known as Bulgarians. The Latins within the fortified Dalmatian cities retained their culture and language for a long time. Dalmatian Romance was spoken until the high Middle Ages, but, they too were eventually assimilated into the body of Slavs.

In the Western Balkans, South Slavs and Germanic Gepids intermarried with invaders, eventually producing a Slavicized population. In Central Europe, the West Slavs intermixed with Germanic, Hungarian, and Celtic peoples, while in Eastern Europe the East Slavs had encountered Finnic and Scandinavian peoples. Scandinavians (Varangians) and Finnic peoples were involved in the early formation of the Rus' state but were completely Slavicized after a century. Some Finno-Ugric tribes in the north were also absorbed into the expanding Rus population. In the 11th and 12th centuries, constant incursions by nomadic Turkic tribes, such as the Kipchak and the Pecheneg, caused a massive migration of East Slavic populations to the safer, heavily forested regions of the north. In the Middle Ages, groups of Saxon ore miners settled in medieval Bosnia, Serbia and Bulgaria, where they were Slavicized.

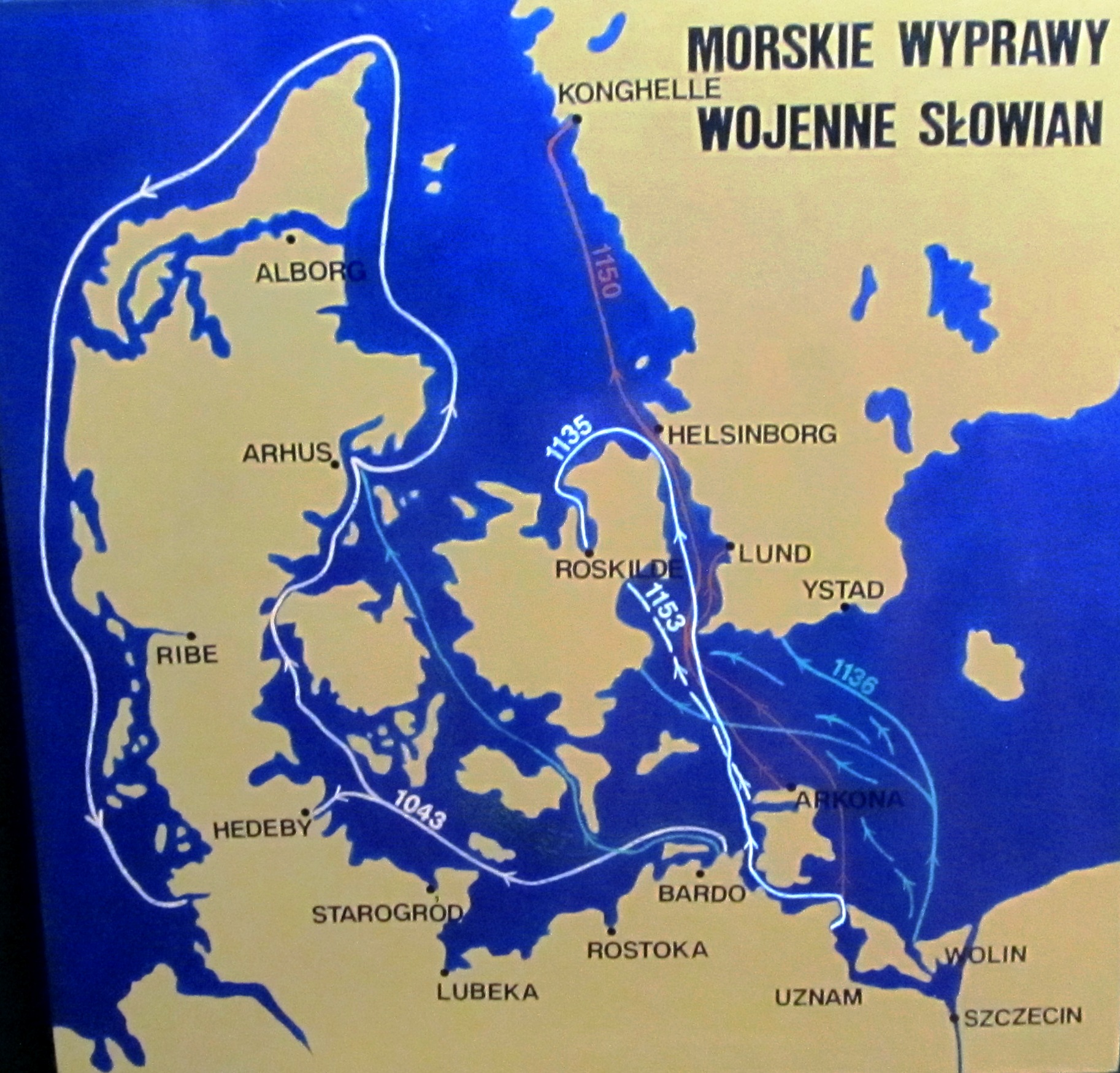
Map showing Slavic raids on Scandinavia in the mid-12th century

Saqaliba refers to the Slavic mercenaries and slaves in the medieval Arab world in North Africa, Sicily and Al-Andalus. Saqaliba served as caliph's guards. In the 12th century, Slavic piracy in the Baltics increased. The Wendish Crusade was started against the Polabian Slavs in 1147, as a part of the Northern Crusades. The pagan chief of the Slavic Obodrite tribes, Niklot, began his open resistance when Lothar III, Holy Roman Emperor, invaded Slavic lands. In August 1160, Niklot was killed, and German colonization (Ostsiedlung) of the Elbe-Oder region began. In Hanoverian Wendland, Mecklenburg-Vorpommern and Lusatia, invaders started germanization. Early forms of germanization were described by German monks: Helmold in the manuscript Chronicon Slavorum and Adam of Bremen in Gesta Hammaburgensis ecclesiae pontificum. The Polabian language survived until the beginning of the 19th century in what is now the German state of Lower Saxony. In Eastern Germany, around 20% of Germans have historic Slavic paternal ancestry, as revealed in Y-DNA testing. Similarly, in Germany, around 20% of the foreign surnames are of Slavic origin.

Cossacks, although Slavic and practicing Orthodox Christianity, came from a mix of ethnic backgrounds, including Tatars and other peoples. The Gorals of southern Poland and northern Slovakia are partially descended from the originally Balkan Romance speaking Vlachs, who migrated into the region from the 14th to 17th centuries and were quickly absorbed into the local population, especially since the majority of Vlachs were already slavicized and the term became synonymous with Ruthenians. The populations of Moravian Wallachia, Carpathian Ruthenia and parts of northern Slovakia are also descended partially from the Vlachs. Conversely, some Slavs were assimilated into other populations. Although the majority continued towards Southeast Europe, attracted by the riches of the area that became the state of Bulgaria, a few remained in the Carpathian Basin in Central Europe and were assimilated into the Magyar people. Numerous rivers and places in Romania have a name with Slavic origins.

== Population ==
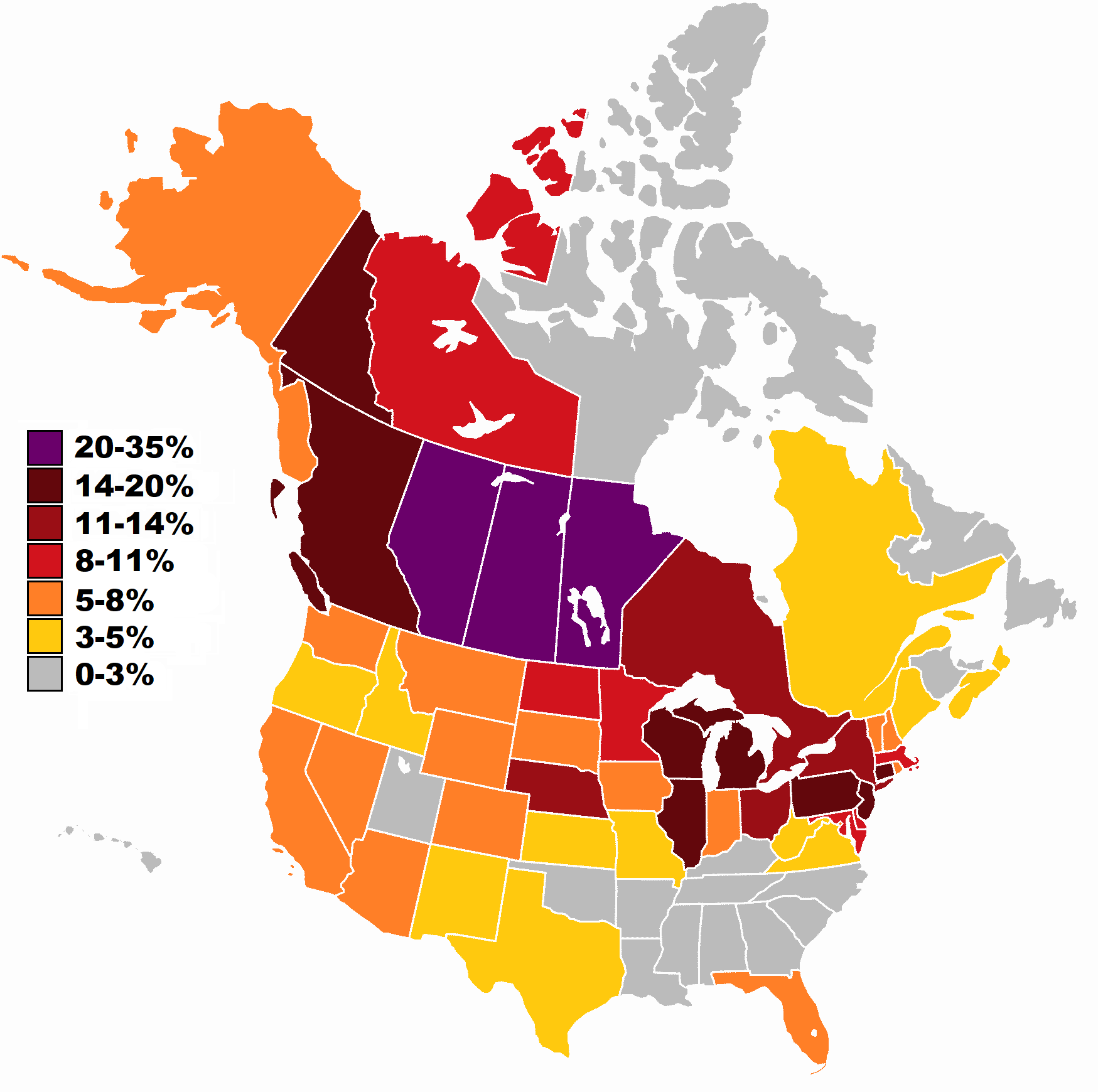
Slavs in the US (1990 census) and Canada (2016 census) by area: 20–35% 14–20% 11–14% 8–11% 5–8% 3–5% 0–3%

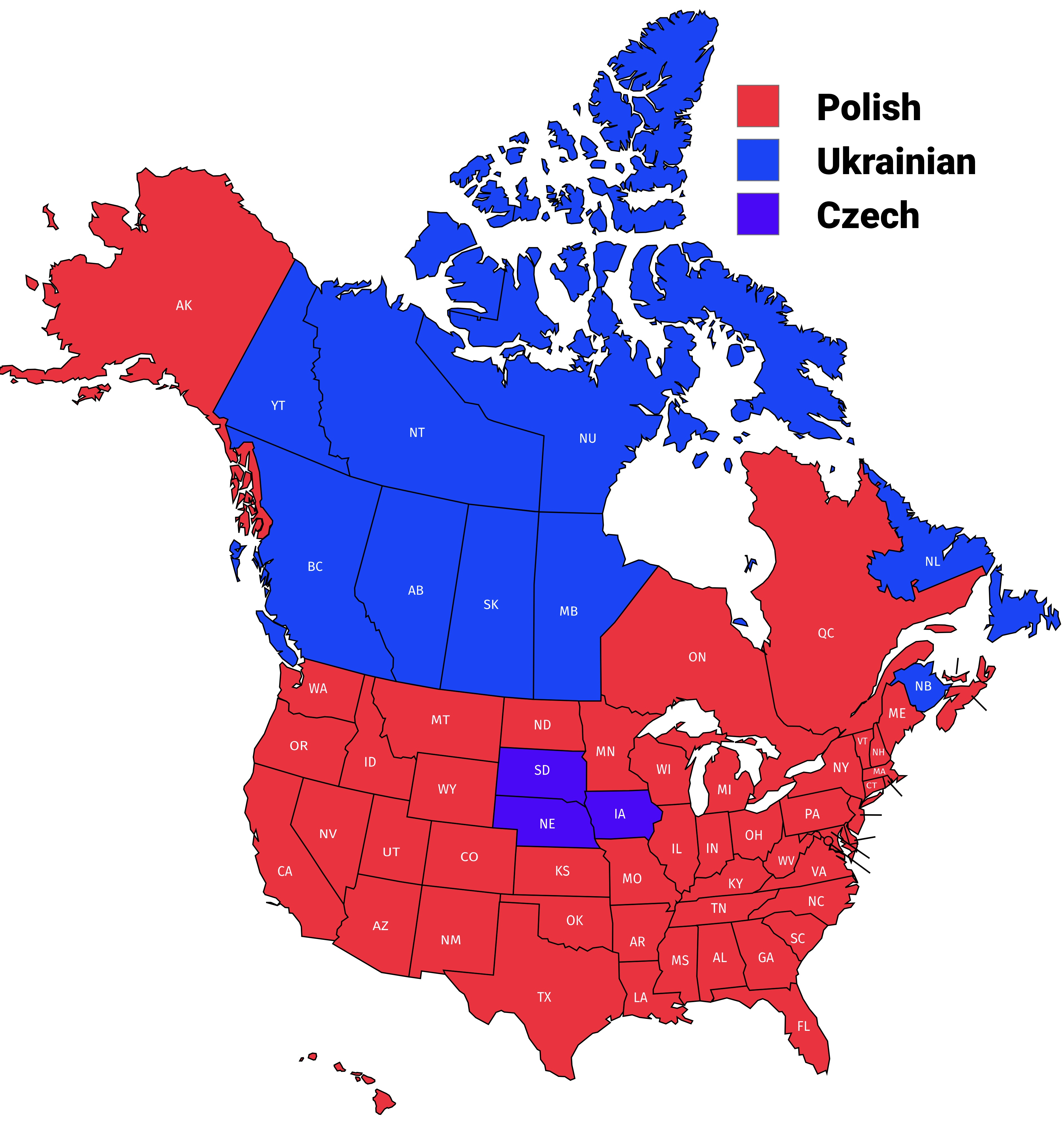
Largest Slavic ancestry in North America by administrative division (2020 United States & 2021 Canada census)

Percentage of ethnic Russians by federal subjects of Russia according to the 2010 census: above 80% 70—79% 50—69% 20—49% below 20%

Winkler Prins (2002) estimated the number of Slavs worldwide to be around c. 260 million at the time. Currently it is estimated that there are 300 million Slavic inhabitants in Central, Eastern, and Southeastern Europe.

Ethnicity	Estimates and census data
Belarusians	c. 8.37 million Belarusians in Belarus (2009 Belarusian census); 46,787 Belarusians in Poland (2011 Polish census); 20,710 "Byelorussian" (5,125 Byelorussian-only) in Canada (2016 Canadian census)
Bosniaks (previously called "Bosnian Muslims")	1,769,592 Bosniaks in Bosnia and Herzegovina (2013 Bosnian census); 153,801 Bosniaks in Serbia (2022 Serbian census); 58,956 Bosniaks in Montenegro (2023 Montenegrin census); 17,018 Bosniaks in North Macedonia (2002 North Macedonia census); 26,740 "Bosnians" (15,610 Bosnian-only) in Canada (2016 Canadian census)
Bulgarians	c. 9 million Bulgarians worldwide (Danver 2015 estimate); 5,118,494 Bulgarians in Bulgaria (2021 Bulgarian census); 12,918 Bulgarians in Serbia (2022 Serbian census); 34,560 Bulgarians (19,965 Bulgarian-only) in Canada (2016 Canadian census)
Bunjevci	11,104 Bunjevci in Serbia (2022 Serbian census)
Croats	c. 4.5 million Croats in Croatia and c. 4 million Croats abroad (1993 estimate by Palermo & Sabanadze 2011); 759,906 Croats in Bosnia and Herzegovina (1991, according to Statistic yearbook of SRBiH 1992); c. 4.5 million Croats outside Croatia (Winland 2004 estimate); c. 4.5 million Croats and people of Croatian heritage outside Croatia and Bosnia and Herzegovina (HWC 2003 estimate); 39,107 Croats in Serbia (2022 Serbian census); 5,150 Croats in Montenegro (2023 Montenegrin census); 133,965 Croats (55,595 Croatian-only) in Canada (2016 Canadian census)
Czechs	c. 6.1 million Czechs in Czechia (2021–22 CIA World Factbook estimate); 6,732,104 Czechs in Czechia (2011 Czech census); 28,996 Czechs in Slovakia (2021 Slovak census); 3,447 Czechs in Poland (2011 Polish census); 104,585 Czechs (23,250 Czech-only) in Canada (2016 Canadian census)
Czechoslovaks (a supra-ethnic category of Czechs and Slovaks)	c. 304,000 people with Czechoslovak ancestry in the United States (2010 American Community Survey); 40,715 "Czechoslovak, not otherwise specified" (5,075 Czechoslovak-only) in Canada (2016 Canadian census)
Gorani	c. 60,000 Gorani worldwide (2009 estimate by political party Građanska inicijativa Goranaca); 7,700 Gorani in Serbia (2022 Serbian census)
Kashubians	c. 331,000 Kashubs and c. 184,000 "half-Kashubs" (couldn't speak Kashubian) in the Gdańsk region (Latoszek 1980s); 52,665 inhabitants of Poland spoke Kashubian at home (49,855 of them also spoke Polish at home) (2002 Polish census); 566,737 "Kashubs and people with partial Kashubian ancestry" in Pomerania (Mordawski 2005); 232,547 Kashubians in Poland (2011 Polish census) (Note: Including 16,000 single ethnic identity, 216,000 multiple ethnic identity Polish and Kashubian, 1,000 multiple ethnic identity Kashubian and another in Poland.)
Macedonians	1,297,981 Macedonians in North Macedonia (2002 North Macedonia census); c. 580,000 Macedonian emigrants (1964 estimate); 14,767 Macedonians in Serbia (2022 Serbian census); 43,110 Macedonians (18,405 Macedonian-only) in Canada (2016 Canadian census)
Montenegrins	256,436 Montenegrins in Montenegro (2023 Montenegrin census); c. 500,000 Montenegrins outside Montenegro (2014 Montenegrin Foreign Ministry estimate); 20,238 Montenegrins in Serbia (2022 Serbian census); 4,165 Montenegrins (915 Montenegrin-only) in Canada (2016 Canadian census)
Moravians	522,474 Moravians in Czechia (2011 Czech census); 1,098 Moravians in Slovakia (2021 Slovak census)
Muslims (ethnic group) (a supra-ethnic category of Bosniaks, Gorani, Torbeši)	13,011 Muslims in Serbia (2022 Serbian census); 10,162 Muslims in Montenegro (2023 Montenegrin census); 12,121 Muslims in Bosnia and Herzegovina (2013 BiH census)
Poles	37,393,651 inhabitants of Poland with declared Polish ethnicity (2011 Polish census); Over 20,000,000 Polish diaspora (2015 estimate by wspolnotapolska.org.pl); 1,106,585 Poles (264,415 Polish-only) in Canada (2016 Canadian census)
Russians	c. 118 million Russians in the Russian Federation (2002 Winkler Prins estimate); 622,445 Russians (120,165 Russian-only) in Canada (2016 Canadian census)
Rusyns (incl. Boykos, Lemkos, Hutsuls)	c. 1.2 million Rusyns worldwide (1995 Magocsi estimate); 23,746 Rusyns in Slovakia (2021 Slovak census); 11,483 Ruthenians in Serbia (2022 Serbian census); 10,531 Lemkos in Poland (2011 Polish census)
Serbs	c. 9 million Serbs worldwide (2022 Serbian census + various diaspora estimates); 5,360,239 Serbs in Serbia (2022 Serbian census); c. 2.3 million Serb diaspora (2008 World Bank estimate); 1,086,733 Serbs in Bosnia-Herzegovina (2013 Bosnian census); 205,370 Serbs in Montenegro (2023 Montenegrin census); 123,892 Serbs in Croatia (2021 Croatian census); c. 100,000 Serbs in Kosovo (2024 Deutsche Welle estimate); 96,535 Serbs (52,730 Serb-only) in Canada (2016 Canadian census)
Silesians	435,750 Silesians in Poland (2011 Polish census); 12,231 Silesians in Czechia (2011 Czech census); c. 2 million Silesians in Poland (Grabowska 2002 estimate)
Slavs (in the United States and Canada)	c. 137,000 people with "Slavic" ancestry in the United States (2010 American Community Survey); 4,870 "Slavic, not otherwise specified" (1,470 Slavic-only) in Canada (2016 Canadian census)
Slavs in Greece (also a sub-ethnic category of Macedonians and Bulgarians)	c. 200,000 speakers of "Macedonian" in Greece (Friedman 1985); c. 150,000—350,000 "Macedonians in Greek Macedonia" (various estimates around 1995); c. 20,000—50,000 "Slavic-speakers in northern Greece" (1990 USDoS estimates); c. 5,000—10,000 of them self-identified as "Macedonians" (1990 USDoS estimates); c. 10,000—50,000 Slavs in Greece (2002 USDoS estimates)
Slovaks	4,353,775 Slovaks in Slovakia (2011 Slovak census); 4,567,547 Slovaks in Slovakia (2021 Slovak census); 149,140 Slovaks in Czechia (2011 Czech census); 41,730 Slovaks in Serbia (2022 Serbian census); c. 762,000 people with Slovak ancestry in the United States (2010 American Community Survey); 2,294 (1,889 single, 947 multiple ethnic identity) Slovaks in Poland (2011 Polish census); 72,290 Slovaks (20,475 Slovak-only) in Canada (2016 Canadian census)
Slovenes	c. 1,632,000 Slovenes in Slovenia (2002 Slovenian census); c. 2.5 million Slovenes worldwide (2004 Zupančič estimate); c. 1.8 million Slovenes in Slovenia (2004 Zupančič estimate); c. 0.7 million Slovene diaspora (2004 Zupančič estimate); 2,829 Slovenes in Serbia (2022 Serbian census); 40,470 Slovenes (13,690 Slovenian-only) in Canada (2016 Canadian census)
Sorbs	c. 60,000 Sorbs in Germany (20,000 of which still spoke Sorb) (2007 Reuters estimate)
Ukrainians	c. 46.7~51.8 million Ukrainians worldwide (2001 Ukrainian census + various diaspora estimates); c. 58,693,854 Ukrainians worldwide (1994 Pawliczko estimate); c. 37,419,000 Ukrainians in Ukraine (1994 Pawliczko estimate); c. 21,274,854 Ukrainian diaspora (1994 Pawliczko estimate); 1,359,655 Ukrainians (273,810 Ukrainian-only) in Canada (2016 Canadian census); 51,001 Ukrainians in Poland (2011 Polish census); c. 1.2 million Ukrainian refugees recorded in Poland (August 2022 UNHCR figures)
Yugoslavs (a supra-ethnic category of Bosniaks, Croats, Macedonians, Montenegrins, Serbs and Slovenes)	210,395 Yugoslavs in the United States (2021 American Community Survey); 38,480 "Yugoslavian, not otherwise specified" (8,570 Yugoslav-only) in Canada (2016 Canadian census); 27,143 Yugoslavs in Serbia (2022 Serbian census); 26,883 Yugoslavs in Australia (2011 Australian census); 2,570 Yugoslavs in Bosnia and Herzegovina (2013 Bosnian and Herzegovinian census); 1,632 Yugoslavs in Montenegro (2023 Montenegrin census)

== See also ==
- Asia Minor Slavs
- Ethnic groups in Europe
- Gord (archaeology)
- Church Slavonic
- Lech, Čech, and Rus
- List of contemporary ethnic groups
  - List of contemporary ethnic groups of Europe
- List of Slavic tribes
- Outline of Slavic history and culture
- Panethnicity
- Pan-Slavic colors
- Slavic names
- Bulgarisation
- Polonisation
- Russification
- Serbianisation
- Ukrainization
