= Kastelle Priory =

Former Augustinian monastery in Bohuslän, Sweden

Coordinates: 57.8523°N 11.9412°E

Kastelle Priory (Norwegian: Kastelle kloster; Swedish: Kastelleklostret) was an Augustinian monastery at Konghelle in the former Norwegian province of Båhuslen (now Kungälv in Bohuslän, Sweden).

== History ==
The monastery existed from the end of the 12th century until its dissolution during the Protestant Reformation in 1529. It was founded by Archbishop Øystein Erlendsson and completely built by the mid-13th century. The monastery was under the authority of the Archdiocese of Nidaros but also had a close relationship with Æbelholt Abbey at Tjæreby in Denmark.

King Frederick I of Denmark acquired the monastery in 1529 and gave it to Jørgen Steenssøn. The ruins of the monastery have been archaeologically investigated. During excavations by Swedish archaeologist Wilhelm Berg (1891–1892), the remains of the monastery were discovered. This and subsequent excavation results suggest that the major construction work was performed by the mid 13th century.

== See also ==
- Kungahälla

== Other sources ==
- Vigerust, Tore Hermundsson (1991) Kastelle kloster i Konghelles jordegods ca 1160-1600 (Oslo : T.H. Vigerust) (in Norwegian)
