= Kungälvs VBK =

Swedish volleyball club

- Full name: Kungälvs volleybollklubb
- Short name: KVBK
- Founded: 1973
- Ground: Mimershallen, Kungälv, Sweden

Kungälvs VBK is a volleyball club in Kungälv, Sweden, established in 1973. The original name of the club was KFVT, Kungälvs Förenade Volleyboll Team (Kungälv United Volleyball Team) and it changed its name to the current one in 1989.

Kungälv VBK won the Swedish men's national championship 4 out of 5 years in a row starting in 1989, followed by 1991, 1992 and 1993. In 1990, they came in second.

For the 1997/98 season, KVBK declined their place in Sweden's Elitserien (the highest series) due to high costs and requirements, and instead focused on their youth engagement.
