= Konghelle Friary =

Former Franciscan friary in Bohuslän, Sweden

Konghelle Friary (Swedish: Franciskanerklostret i Kungahälla, Norwegian: Fransiskanerklosteret i Konghelle) was a Franciscan friary in the former medieval city of Konghelle (Norwegian; in Swedish: Kungahälla), in Bohuslän, formerly Båhuslen, now in Sweden, formerly in Norway.

The Franciscan Monastery was located east of the medieval city. The friary was founded during the reign of King Magnus Lagabøte who came to the throne in 1263, but before 1272, when it is mentioned as the venue for a council. It was dissolved in 1532 when the buildings were burnt down. The ruins were later used as a quarry for stone for the Bohus Fortress. Ruins of the church were discovered in 1862 but not archaeologically excavated until 1953 and 1954. The rest of the site remains obscure.

== Other sources ==
- Flo, Berit Synnøve; Jostein Flo (2005) Det norske Båhuslen og Norges ukjente hovedstad Konghelle (Kungälv) (Andresen & Butenschøn AS) ISBN 978-8276941791
- Johansson, Sigurd; Kerstin Berg (1984) Det gamla Kungälv (Kungälvs bokhandel) ISBN 91-970662-0-6
