= Baltic Slavic piracy =

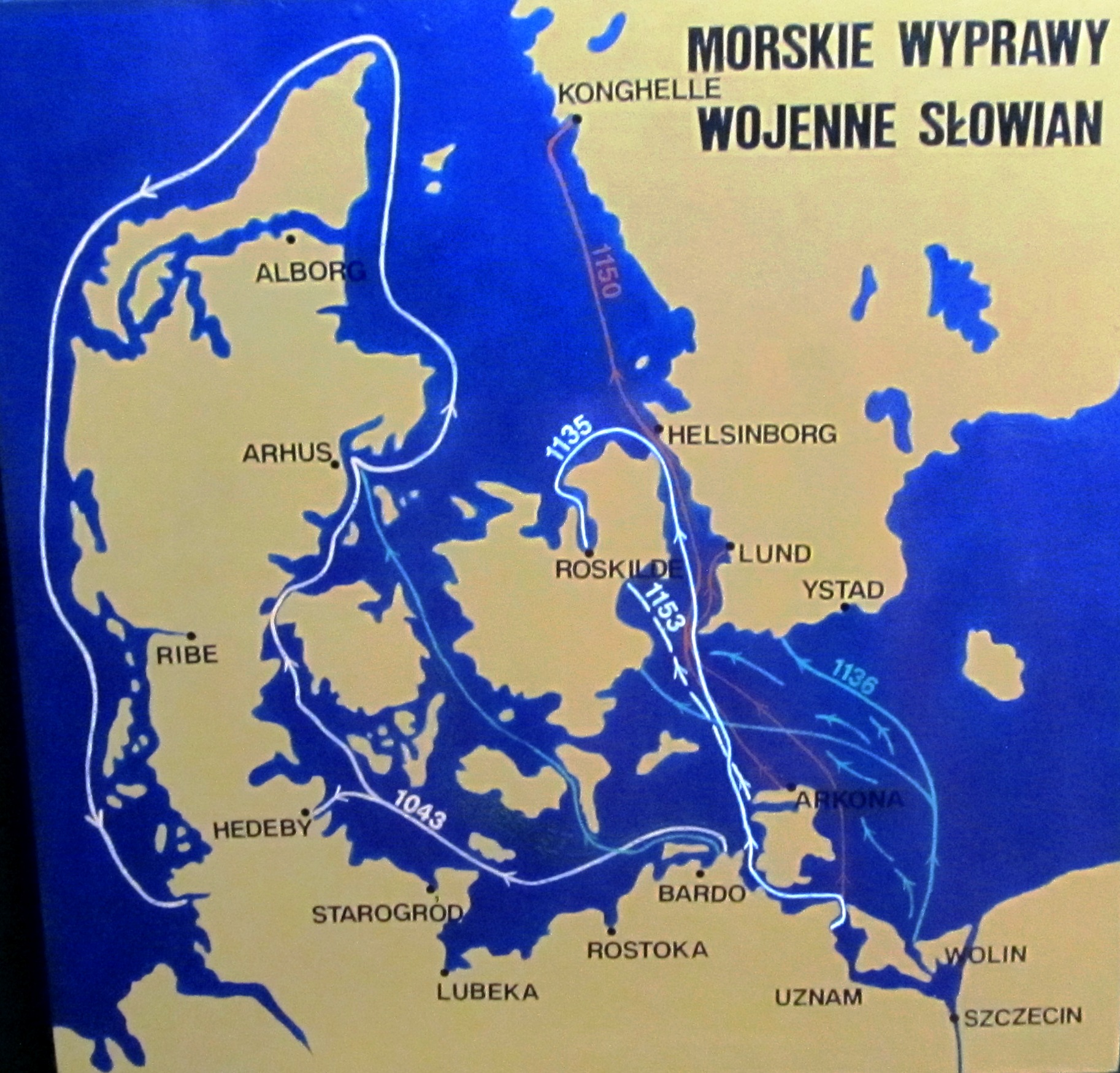
- Map showing Slavic raids on Scandinavia in the mid-12th century
Date	8th century – 1274
Location	Baltic Sea, Scandinavian coasts
Result	Thousands of Scandinavians enslaved and traded in the Wendish and Baltic markets; Devastation of the Scandinavian coastal cities; Cessation of piracy after the Wendish and Prussian crusades

Belligerents
Wends: Obotrite Confederacy; Obotrites; Wagrians; Liutizian Confederacy Wendish allies: Duchy of Pomerania; Baltic pagans: Prussians; Bartians; Galindians; Natangians; Nadruvians; Pomesanians; Pogesanians; Sambians; Warmians; Curonians; Yotvingians (Sudovians); Skalvians Baltic allies: Grand Duchy of Lithuania; Duchy of Pomerania (During Prussian crusade)	Kingdom of Denmark; Kingdom of Sweden; Kingdom of Norway; Holy Roman Empire Allies: Teutonic Order; Order of Dobrin; Duchy of Masovia; Kingdom of Poland; Duchy of Pomerania (turned); Duchy of Pomerelia; Duchy of Gdańsk; Duchy of Świecie and Lubiszewo; Duchy of Lubiszewo; Kingdom of Galicia–Volhynia; Order of Calatrava (During Wendish and Prussian crusades)

Pirates of Baltic Slavic origin carried out military campaigns in the Baltic Sea from the 8th to 13th centuries. The Slavic pirates were most active from c. 1050, with reputation for bringing terror to the Scandinavian coasts for over a hundred years.

== Geography and economy ==
Baltic Slavs, whose agriculture was not highly developed in early 7th century, were in dire need of resources since the dry islets of southwestern Baltic were the only ones capable of cultivation and cattle were scarce. Flax could be grown, and was turned into linen or canvas for cloth and used as a form of currency.

At this time the Baltic Slavs were also known for bee-keeping, trading their honey and wax to the Germans for use in church candles and in sealing documents. Once trade began, the German form of currency circulated amongst the group. After this point, information on specifics of the trade between Germans and Slavs is unknown through the 9th century.

== Wendish trade ==
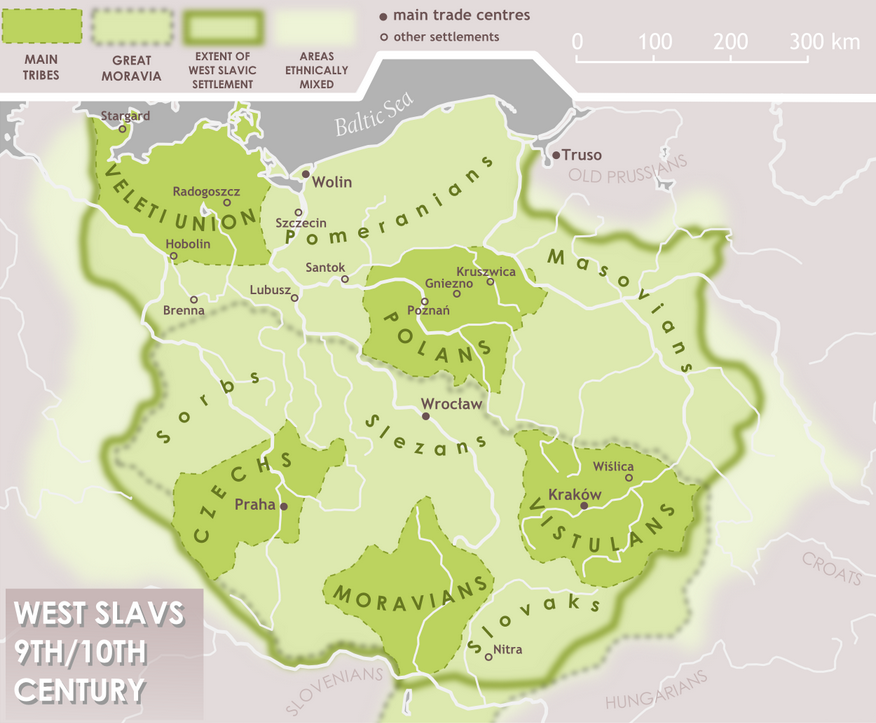
The West Slavs in the 9th–10th centuries

During this time period it is known that the Slavs crossed paths with the Danes. The Slavs of the Baltic had engaged in piratical activity before, while the Danes felt that trade and piracy went hand in hand.

Baltic Slavs soon became interested in expanding, attempting to get a hold of the rivers in Denmark in order to control the Wendish trade. The Danes would not stand for this, causing war to arise between the two groups. With the decline of Danish power after the death of their leader in 1035 fueling the Saxon Germans to fight for the possession of the rivers the Baltic Slavs were originally fighting for, the bloodshed raged on and it was not until the Wendish Crusade of 1147 that the Slavs were finally sent beyond the point of recovery, ending their 100-year campaign and therefore fixing German domination over the Baltic rivers and Wendish trade.

The Wendish pirates continued to enslave thousands of Scandinavians until the complete dissolution of their confederation. The Danish lands were most affected by the Wendish raids. In 1168, Helmold reported that the Wendish capital of Mecklenburg put up 700 Danish slaves for sale in a single day.

== Notable actions ==
In 1135, Duke Ratibor I of Duchy of Pomerania commanded a force of 1,000–1,500 Pomeranian raiders on 50–70 boats during a major raid on the Norwegian city of Kungahälla.

In a successful raid on Kungahälla, Pomeranians enslaved thousands. Snorri Sturluson wrote that Kungahälla never recovered from the raid. However, this raid became one of the last successful actions of the Pomeranians on this scale.

The pillage of Sigtuna was the raid of the Swedish town of Sigtuna by pagans from the Eastern Baltic in 1187, leading to its destruction.

== Baltic slave trade ==
One of the activities of the Baltic pirates was to capture people for the Baltic slave trade, which was mainly involved in trafficking slaves to the Southeast to the Black Sea slave trade.

When the Norse Vikings became Christian and ended their piracy in the 11th century, they were succeeded by Pagan pirates from the Baltics, who raided the coasts of the Baltic Sea, such as the now Christian Sweden and Finland, for slaves. When the Viking slave trade stopped in the mid 11th century, the old slave trade route between the Baltic Sea and the Black Sea and Central Asia via the Russian rivers was upheld by Pagan Baltic slave traders, who sold slaves via Daugava to the Black Sea and East, which was now the only remaining slave trade in Europe after the slave market in Western Europe had died out in the 12th century. In the 13th century, the Latvian reportedly had found slave trade to be so lucrative that many used it has their main income. The island of Saaremaa was a base for the Baltic pirates, who were noted for selling women captives to the slave trade. In 1226, the pagan Baltic pirates from Saaremaa conducted a slave raid toward now Christian Sweden, where they captured many Swedish women and girls with the purpose to sell as slaves.

The Baltic slave trade ended after conquest of the Baltic by the Teutonic Order during the 13th century.

== See also ==
- Thalassocracy
- Narentines
- Ushkuyniks
- Victual Brothers
- Kylfings

== Bibliography ==
- Gaca, Andrzej (2020-01-09). "Baltic Slavs fighting at sea from the ninth to twelfth century. The phenomenon of over a hundred years of Slavic domination over the Baltic Sea". Studia Iuridica Toruniensia. 24: 51. doi:10.12775/SIT.2019.003. ISSN 2391-7873.
