= Kungälv =

City in Bohuslän, Sweden

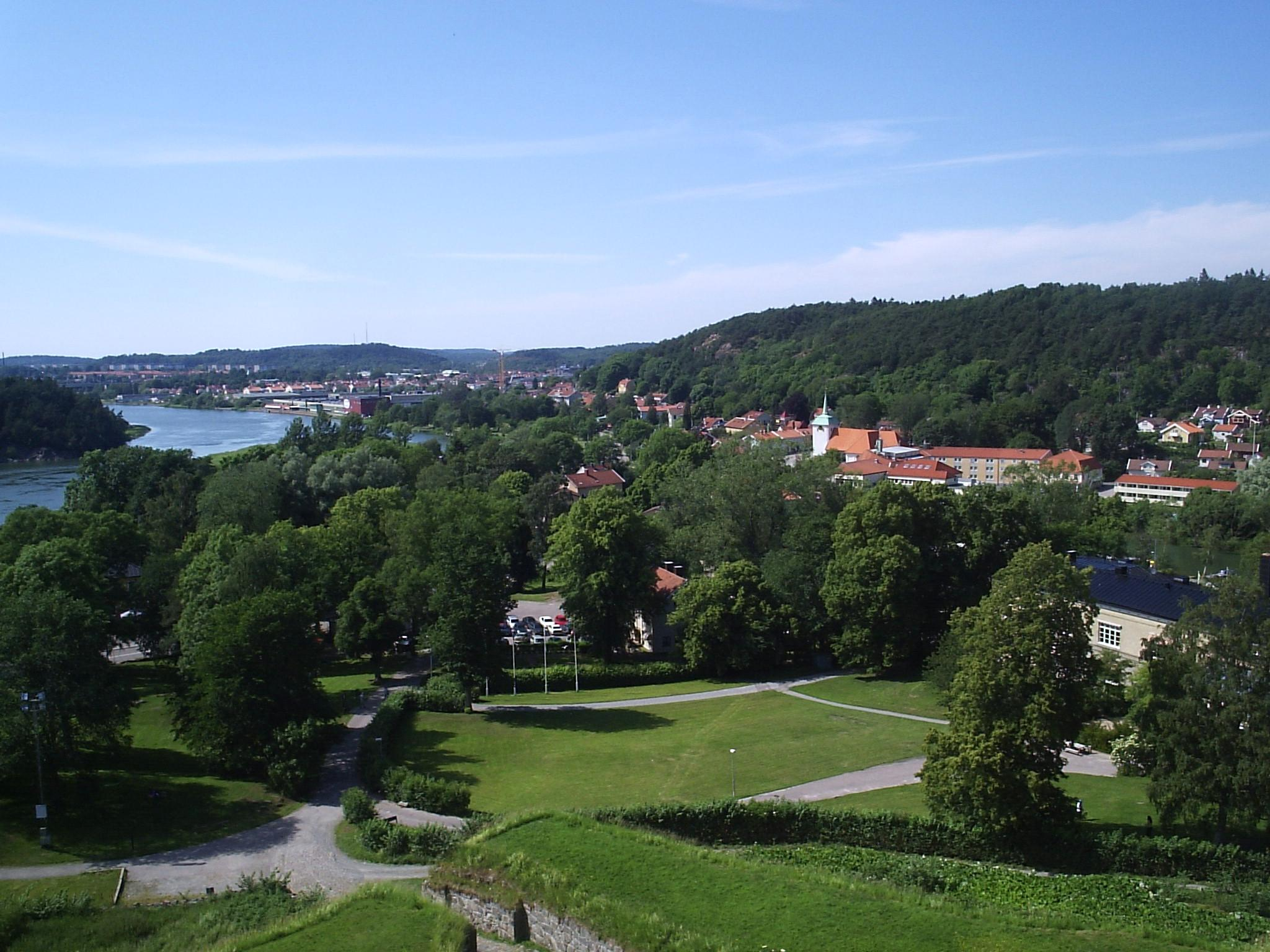
- Kungälv from Bohus fästning in July 2006

- Location within Västra Götaland Location within Sweden
- Coordinates: 57°52′N 11°58′E
- Country: Sweden
- Province: Bohuslän
- County: Västra Götaland County
- Municipality: Kungälv Municipality

Area
  - Total: 11.52 km^{2} (4.45 sq mi)

Population (31 December 2010)
  - Total: 22,768
  - Density: 1,976/km^{2} (5,120/sq mi)
- Time zone: UTC+1 (CET)
  - Summer (DST): UTC+2 (CEST)

Kungälv (Swedish pronunciation: [ˈkɵ̂ŋːɛlv]) is a city and the seat of Kungälv Municipality in Västra Götaland County, Sweden. It is also a part of Greater Gothenburg Metropolitan Area. It had 22,768 inhabitants in 2010. In 2021, the main Kungälv - Ytterby - Kareby conurbation had a combined population approaching 30,000.

== History ==
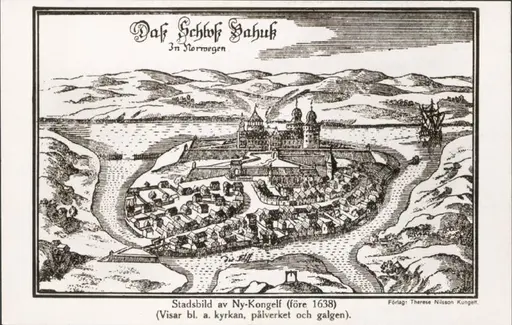
A drawing of Ny Kongelf and Bohus Fortress before 1638.

According to official Swedish sources the city was founded in 1612, when the city of Konghelle was moved closer to the Bohus Fortress. However, this is disputed because other sources indicate that it was just a strategic relocation of the existing Norwegian city, the capital of Norway at one point under Sigurd I Magnusson, something frequently used for marketing and tourist purposes. For this reason, Kungälv could celebrate its "1000-year anniversary" in 1959.

Sigurd I Magnusson (Sigurd Jorsalfare, i.e., Sigurd the Crusader) was the King of Norway (1103–1130) and is the best-known crusader king of Scandinavia. He was also the first European king to join the crusades at a time when Kungälv was Norwegian territory.

Sigurd returned to Norway in 1111, where he made his capital in Konghelle (in the vicinity of Kungälv in present-day Sweden) and built a castle there, where he kept a relic given to him by King Baldwin, a splinter reputed to be from the True Cross. Sigurd died in 1130 and was buried in Hallvardskirken (Hallvards church) in Oslo, in present-day Norway.

In the 1120s Pomeranian ships from Stettin (present-day Szczecin, Poland), from the southern coast of the Baltic Sea attacked the Danish coast. On 10 August 1135 Duke Ratibor assaulted the Norwegian towns. Konghelle, was captured and burnt to the ground by the forces of prince Ratibor, assisted by a fleet of 550 ships with cavalry on board (each carrying forty-four men and two horses). They laid the town to ruins, killed a large part of the population, and abducted most of the survivors as thralls to Szczecin. Snorri Sturluson, writing a century later, said that Konghelle never completely recovered.

The former settlement at Konghelle burned down in 1612, and was subsequently moved by Christian IV of Denmark and Norway to the open slope below Bohus Fortress, and rebuilt as Kongelf.

The Bohus Fortress remains the most popular tourist attraction in Kungälv.

== Notable people ==
- Mikael Andersson, Former NHL-forward and Olympian was raised in Kungälv.
- Niklas Andersson, Former NHL-forward and younger brother of Mikael was born and raised in Kungälv.
- P. J. Axelsson, Former Boston Bruins forward and Olympian was born and raised in Kungälv.
- Eva von Bahr (physicist), First female docent in physics in Sweden lived in Kungälv
- Mirsad Bektašević the jihadist was born in Montenegro and grew up in Kungälv
- Carin Koch, Professional golfer was born and raised in Kungälv.
- Erik Lindh, Former table tennis player and Olympic bronze medalist
- Lise Meitner, Austrian physicist who worked on radioactivity and nuclear physics, was on vacation in Kungälv with her nephew Otto Frisch when she realized that nuclear fission was possible.
- John Hron, the victim of a high-profile murder / hate crime was raised in Kungälv
- Fredrik Sjöström, Former NHL-forward was raised in Kungälv.
- Ernst Skarstedt, Swedish-American author, journalist and editor was born in Kungälv.
- Pontus Wernbloom, Professional football player.

== Transport ==
- European route E6
- Västtrafik regional buses
- Bohusbanan railway (Ytterby station)

== Sports ==
The following sports clubs are located in Kungälv:

- Kungälvs VBK - multiple Swedish champions in volleyball in the 1980s and 90s
- IFK Kungälv
- Ytterby IS
- IK Kongahälla
- Kungälvs SK
- Kungälvs simsällskap
- Kongahälla AIK
- Kungälvs HK
