= St. Olav's Abbey, Tønsberg =

Coordinates: 59°15′59″N 10°24′36″E

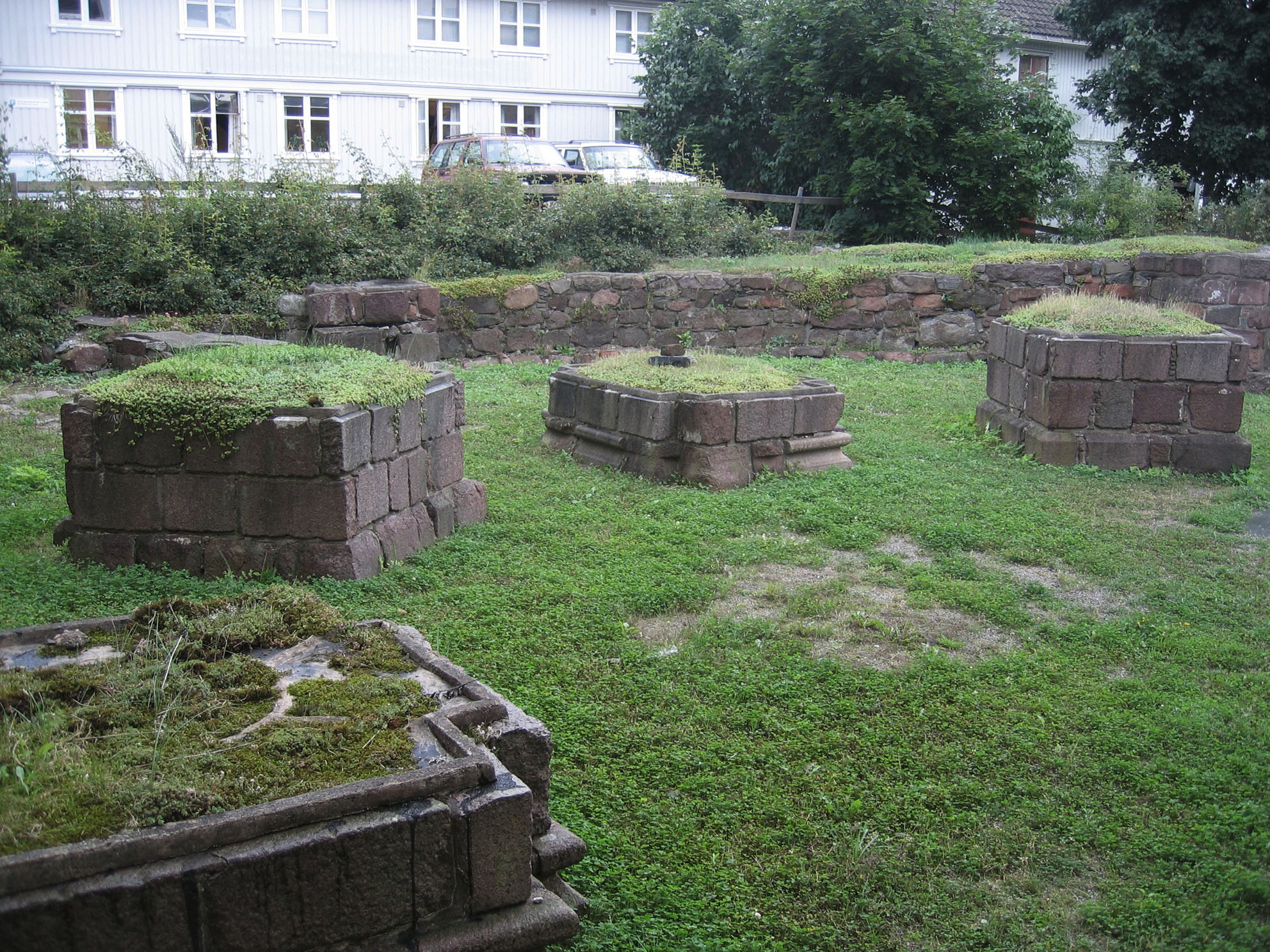
Ruins of the church of St. Olav's Abbey, Tønsberg

St. Olav's Abbey, Tønsberg (Norwegian: Olavsklosteret i Tønsberg) was a Premonstratensian monastery, located in Tønsberg, Norway.

== History ==
The Premonstratensian canons founded the monastery, dedicated to Saint Olav, in Tønsberg in the second half of the 12th century, possibly in or shortly before 1191. The church was completed by 1207, as is confirmed by the record of a burial there in that year. This was a very wealthy establishment with considerable influence in the affairs of its time. It was nevertheless unable to resist secularisation in 1532 during the Reformation, when King Fredrik I granted it as a fief to Erik Ugerup. The monastic buildings were badly damaged by a fire in 1536, although possibly some may have been repaired to serve as the residence of the owner. The extensive estates later passed into the hands of the earls of Jarlsberg.

== Buildings ==
The church was extremely unusual in that it was round, the only round church in the province and one of the largest in the whole of Scandinavia. There may be some connection between the shape and the cult of Saint Olav, which was centred on his shrine in the octagonal chapel at the east end of Nidaros Cathedral.

The nave had a diameter of about 23 metres. There was a round apse at the east end, with another round chamber - probably the sacristy - opening off it, and portals to the north, west and south.

Archaeological excavations were carried out in 1877, 1929, 1963–67 and 1969–71. Although it seems clear that the conventual buildings were attached in some way to the church, it has not so far been possible to establish their exact layout. The burial ground must have been to the north and east of the church.

== Site ==
The ruins of the round church are still to be seen at Storgaten 17 and 19, with some remains of conventual buildings to the south-east. Some have been incorporated into the structure of the Tønsberg Municipal Library.

== Sources and references ==
- Norges klostre i middelalderen: Olavsklosteret i Tønsberg (in Norwegian)
- Fra klostergods til borgergods (in Norwegian)
- Pictures of the abbey ruins
- Abbey remains in Tønsberg Municipal Library (in Norwegian)
- Vestfold-Minne 1971.
- Johnsen, O. A., 1929-1934: Tønsbergs historie, pp. 206–232. Oslo
- Lunde, 0., 1971: Premonstratenserklosteret i Tønsberg St. Olavs kirke - Nordens største rundkirke. I: Vestfold-Minne, pp. 68–85.
