= Kungahälla =

Medieval city in Sweden

Coordinates: 57.8452°N 11.9397°E

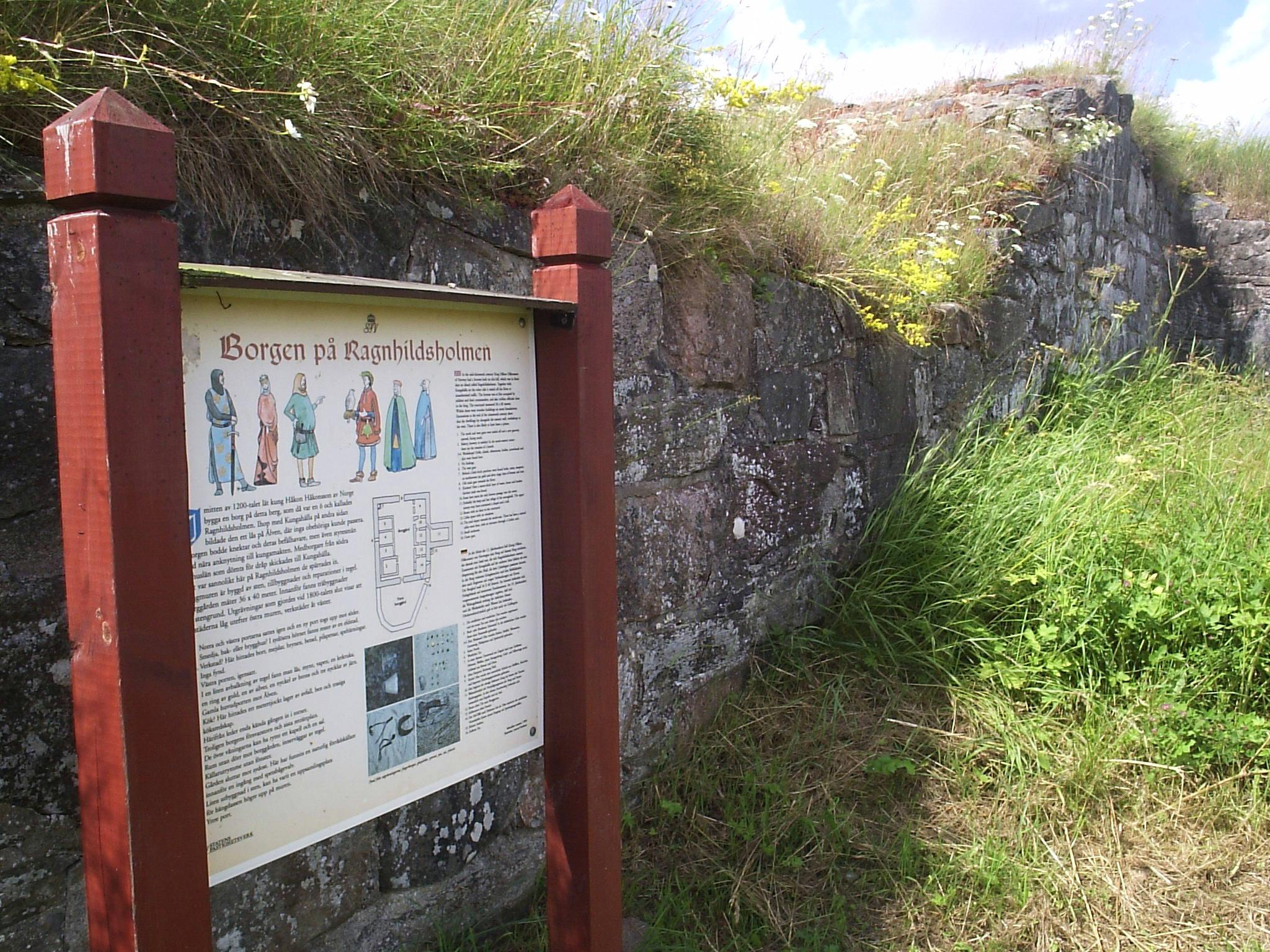
Ragnhildsholmen

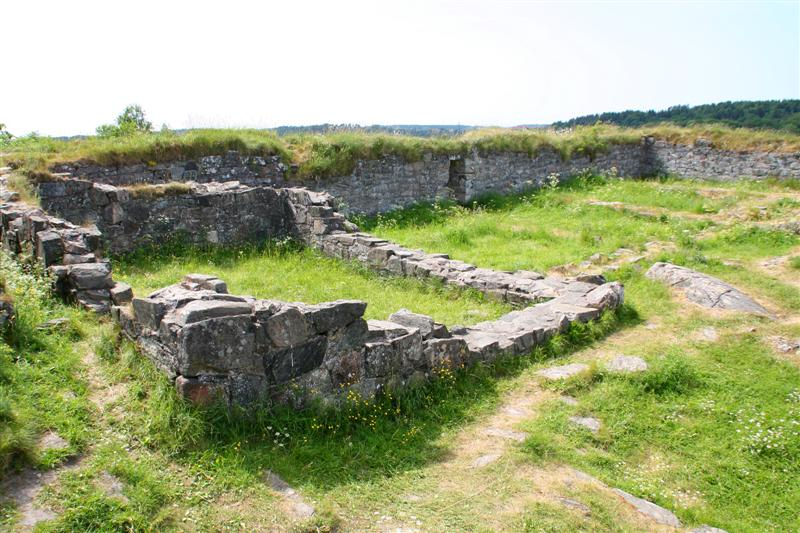
Ruins of the castle Miklaborg near Kungahälla

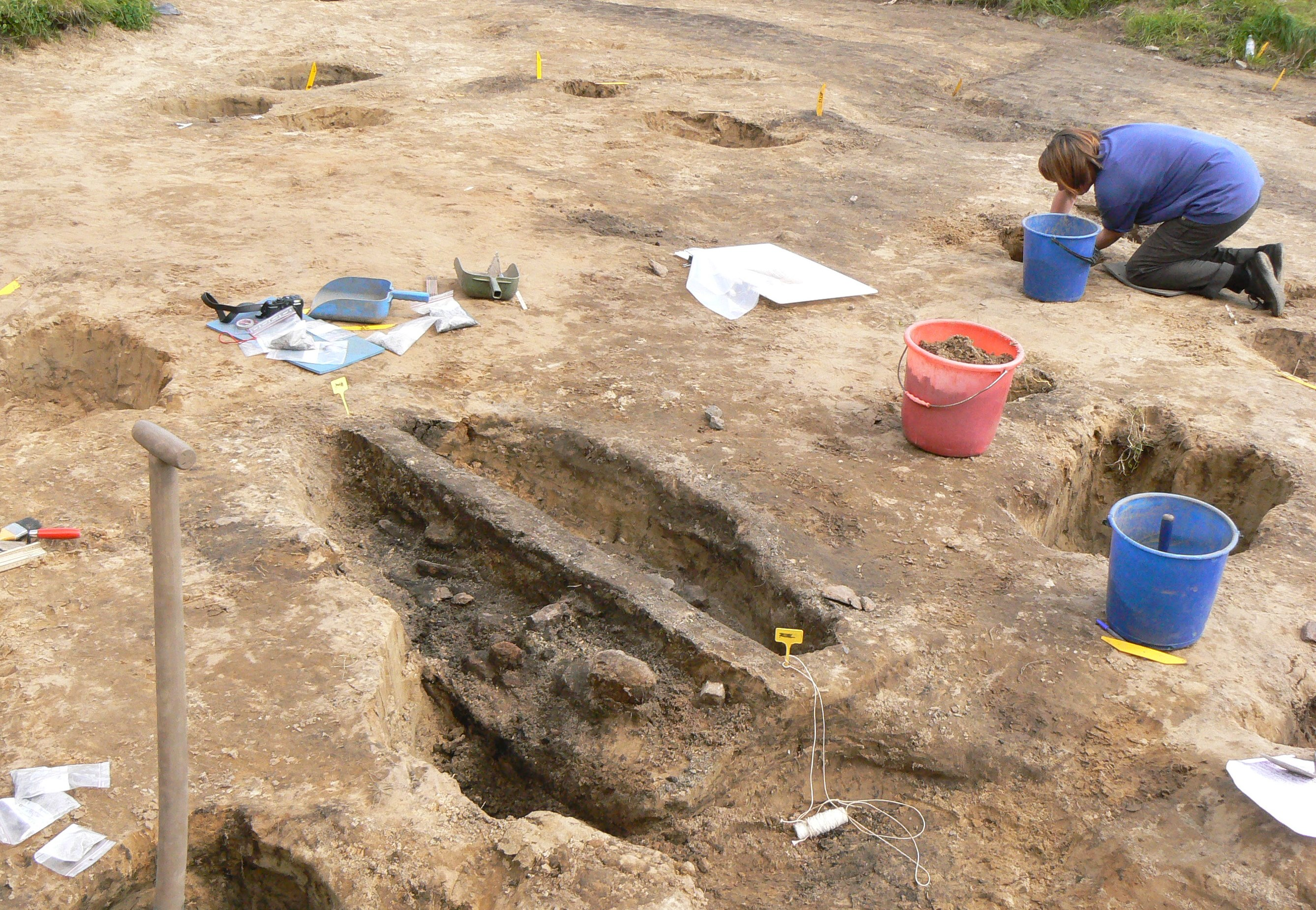
Archaeology professor Tove Hjørungdal at work in Ytterby 2009 at the site interpreted as the remains of the precursor to Kungahälla.

Kungahälla (Note: Swedish: Kungahälla; Norwegian: Konghelle; Old Norse: Konungahella)) was a medieval settlement in southern Bohuslän at a site which is located in Kungälv Municipality in Västra Götaland County in Sweden. It is the site of the former fortification at Ragnhildsholmen (Borgen på Ragnhildsholmen).

== History ==
The Norwegian Kings' sagas talk of Konghelle as a Viking Age settlement. According to Snorri Sturluson, Konghelle was the location of two important royal summits to conclude peace between Sweden and Norway. The first saw the two King Olavs, Olaf the Saint of Norway and Olof Skötkonung of Sweden, agree to a peace treaty, ca 1020. The second was called the meeting of the three kings during which the three Scandinavian kings Inge I of Sweden, Magnus Barefoot of Norway and Eric Evergood of Denmark met in Kungahälla in 1101. When King Sigurd I Magnusson returned to Norway in 1111 following his crusade, he made his capital in Konghelle.

Konghelle appears in writings by the English chronicler, Orderic Vitalis, who named the city as one of six Norwegian civitates. During August 1135, the city was attacked and sacked by the Pomeranians. After the destruction, the city was moved to a site slightly to the west of the original site. Snorri Sturluson, writing a century later, said that Konghelle never completely recovered.

The city was a center of royal authority during the early Middle Ages and especially the 13th century, when it was the Norwegian kingdom's southernmost outpost. At this time the fort on Ragnhildsholmen and a Franciscan monastery were constructed at the site, while Kastelle kloster monastery was rebuilt.

Kastelle kloster was founded by Archbishop Eysteinn Erlendsson and built in the middle of the 13th century. The monastery was under the jurisdiction of the Archdiocese of Nidaros. King Frederick I of Denmark confiscated the monastery in 1529 as part of the closure of monasteries within his realm.

Ragnhildsholmen is an island in the Göta älv, a river that drains Vänern into Kattegat, across from Konghelle. In 1256 Norwegian King Haakon IV of Norway had invaded Halland, at that time a province held by Denmark. The castle was built by King Haakon and played a role in Haakon's expansionist politics. It was the most important Norwegian fortress in this area.

In the early 14th century, Konghelle was the fief of Duke Erik Magnusson, father of Magnus Eriksson, the future king of Sweden and Norway. Duke Erik received the fortress as a gift when he helped his father-in-law King Haakon V of Norway to attack his brother, King Birger of Sweden.

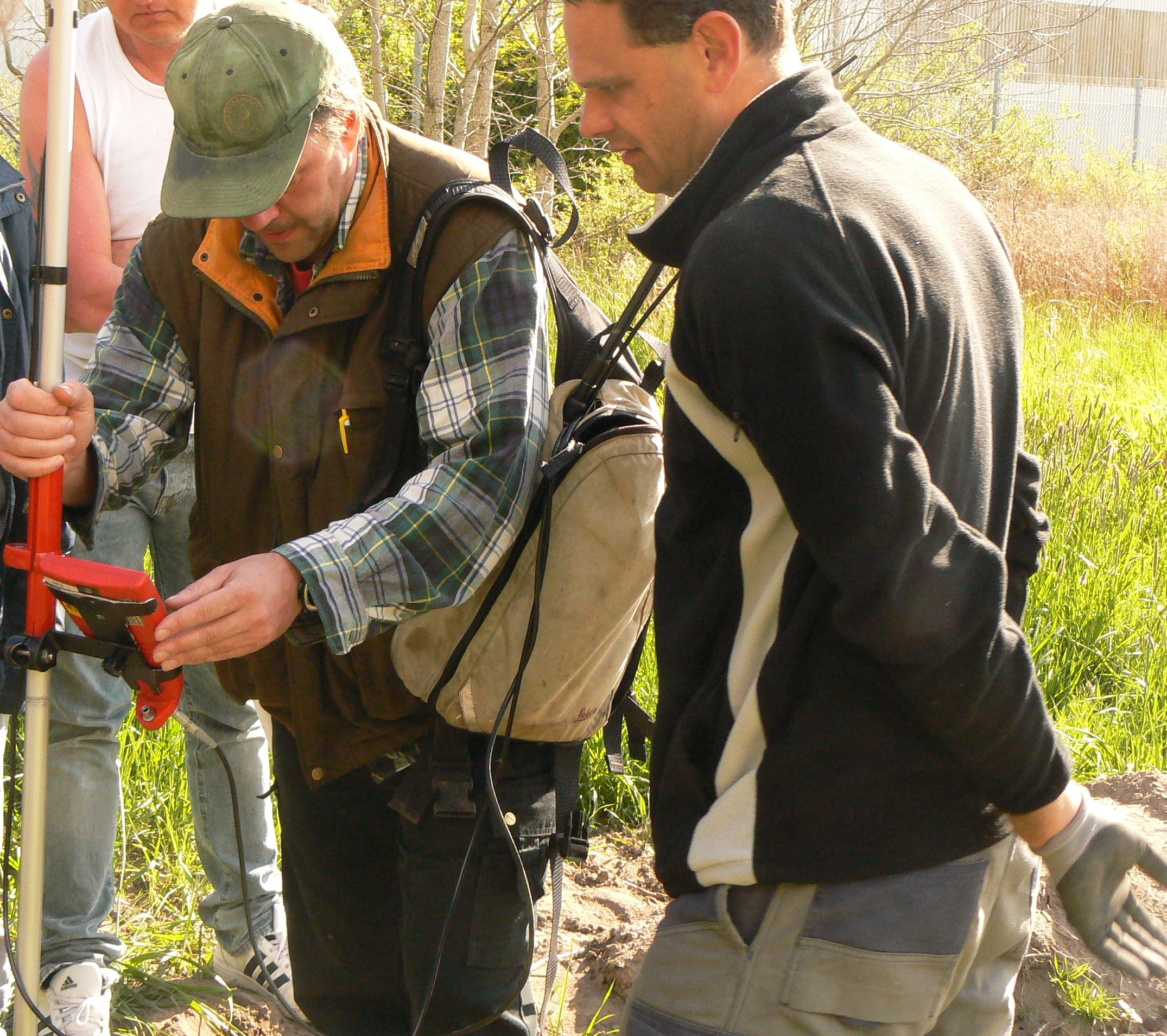
Archaeologists Carl L. Thunberg and Johan Ling from the University of Gothenburg during the excavations in Ytterby 2009. The site (RAÄ Ytterby 22:1) has been interpreted as the precursor to Kungahälla.

After the construction of the stronghold Bohus in 1308 by King Haakon V, the castle on Ragnhildsholmen started to lose its importance as a royal seat. It is not mentioned after 1320. In the later Middle Ages the town's importance further declined. It burned down in 1612, and was afterwards moved to a location near Bohus and renamed Kungälv. Bohuslän continued to belong to Norway until it was ceded to Sweden in the Treaty of Roskilde in 1658.

== Excavations ==
Archaeological excavations began in the late 19th century at Ragnhildsholmen and the monastery of Kastelle kloster site and continue to the present day. Excavation results indicate that major construction works were carried out by the middle of the 13th century. However, there is archaeological evidence for a royal estate slightly north of the city, dating back to the Viking Age.

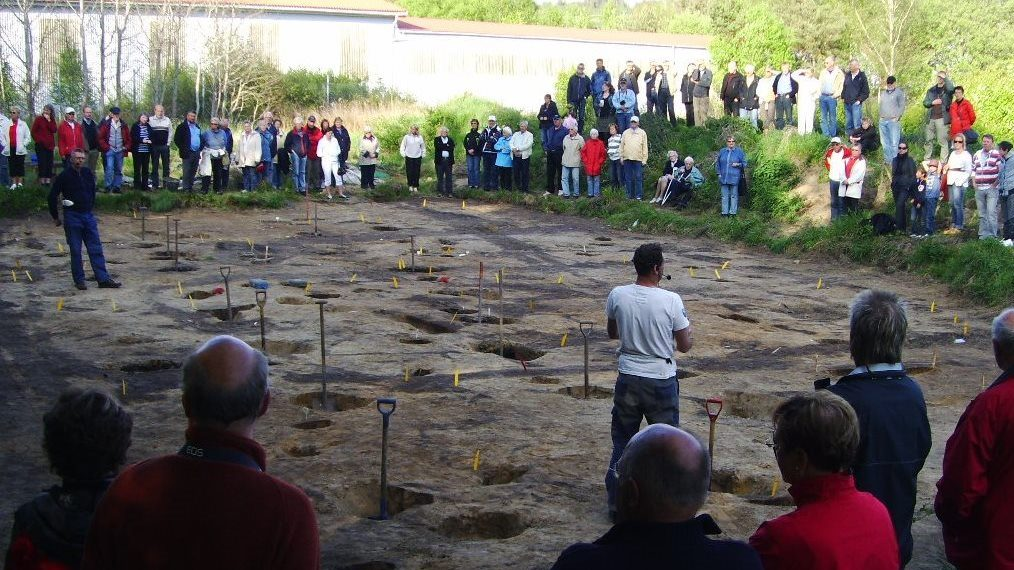
Archaeologists Johan Ling and Ulf Ragnesten show the remains of the approximately 40 m long and 10 m wide hall building of the presumed precursor to Kungahälla in Ytterby to the public and the press. 12 May 2009.

During excavations by Swedish archaeologist Wilhelm Berg (1891–1892), the remains of the monastery were discovered. The principal excavations of the monastery were during 1953 to 1954 and in 1958 archaeological excavations were carried out of a medieval cemetery area in the ancient city. Several excavations in different places within the old city area were carried out between the years 1985-1994.

== The precursor to Kungahälla ==
Archaeologists believe that there was a precursor to the Viking community Kungahälla which was located just south of Ytterby, and that this community was located on the lands of today's Ytterby near the great burial ground of Västra porten/Smällen. In Ytterby, archaeologists have found remains of several buildings from the Iron Age built between 500 BC. and 600 AD. Of these, the largest is a hall building that was 48 meters long and 10 meters wide. This type of building belonged to the upper classes of society and the find may be the first find of a hall building from the migration period in Bohuslän, since the building was built between 400 and 600 AD. The found of the remains of the hall building is believed to be a precursor to the royal estate that is mentioned in several sources, including in Njáls saga from the 13th century. King Olav II Haraldsson of Norway, later known as Saint Olav, is said to have spent a year on these lands waiting for the inhabitants of Kungälv to complete his fleet before sailing to the Faroe Islands to demand taxes. The royal hall building was also occasionally inhabited by kings Olav Tryggvason, Harald Hardrada as well as other kings and magnates.

== See also ==
- Heimskringla

== Other sources ==
- Andersson, H. Kungahälla (Riksantikvarieämbetet och Statens Historiska Museer, Stockholm, 1981)
- Berg, Wilhelm Bidrag till kännedom om Göteborgs och Bohusläns fornminnen (1883)
