= Aristocracy of Norway =

Socially privileged class in Norway

The aristocracy of Norway is the modern and medieval aristocracy in Norway. Additionally, there have been economical, political, and military elites that—relating to the main lines of Norway's history—are generally accepted as nominal predecessors of the aforementioned. Since the 16th century, modern aristocracy is known as nobility (Norwegian: adel).

The very first aristocracy in today's Norway appeared during the Bronze Age (1800 BC–500 BC). This bronze aristocracy consisted of several regional elites, whose earliest known existence dates to 1500 BC. Via similar structures in the Iron Age (400 BC–793 AD), these entities would reappear as petty kingdoms before and during the Age of Vikings (793–1066). Beside a chieftain or petty king, each kingdom had its own aristocracy.

Between 872 and 1050, during the so-called unification process, the first national aristocracy began to develop. Regional monarchs and aristocrats who recognised King Harald I as their high king, would normally receive vassalage titles like Earl. Those who refused were defeated or chose to migrate to Iceland, establishing an aristocratic, clan-ruled state there. The subsequent lendman aristocracy in Norway—powerful feudal lords and their families—ruled their respective regions with great autonomy. Their status was by no means equal to that of modern nobles; they were nearly half royal. For example, Ingebjørg Finnsdottir of the Arnmødling dynasty was married to King Malcolm III of Scotland. During the civil war era (1130–1240) the old lendmen were severely weakened, and many disappeared. This aristocracy was ultimately defeated by King Sverre I and the Birchlegs, subsequently being replaced by supporters of Sverre.

Primarily between the 9th and 13th centuries, the aristocracy was not limited to mainland Norway, but appeared in and ruled parts of the British Isles as well as Iceland and the Faroe Islands. Kingdoms, city states, and other types of entities, for example the Kingdom of Dublin, were established or possessed either by Norwegians or by native vassals. Other territories, for example Shetland and the Orkney Islands, were directly absorbed into the kingdom. For example, the Earl of Orkney was a Norwegian nobleman.

The nobility—known as hird and then as knights and squires—was institutionalised during the formation of the Norwegian state in the 13th century (see List of nobles and magnates within Scandinavia in the 13th century). Originally granted an advisory function as servants of the king, the nobility grew into becoming a great political factor. Their land and their armed forces, and also their legal power as members of the Council of the Realm, made the nobility remarkably independent from the king. At its height, the council had the power to recognise or choose inheritors of or pretenders to the throne. In 1440, they dethroned King Eric III. The council even chose its own leaders as regents, among others Sigurd Jonsson of Sudreim. This aristocratic power, which also involved the Catholic Church, lasted until the Reformation, when King Christian III established the protestant Denmark-Norway. This would nearly remove all of the nobility's political foundation, leaving them with mainly administrative and ceremonial functions. Subsequent immigration of Danish nobles (who thus became Norwegian nobles) would further marginalise the position of natives. In the 17th century, the old nobility consisted almost entirely of nobles with some Danish descendants, like the noble family Bjelke.

After 1661, when absolute monarchy was introduced, the old nobility was gradually replaced by a new. This consisted mainly of merchants and officials who had recently been ennobled but also of foreign nobles who were naturalised. Dominant elements in the new nobility were the office nobility (noble status by holding high civilian or military offices) and—especially prominent in the 18th century—the letter nobility (noble status via letters patent in return for military or artistic achievements or monetary donations). Based on the 1665 Lex Regia, which stated that the king was to be revered and considered the most perfect and supreme person on the Earth by all his subjects, standing above all human laws and having no judge above his person, [...] except God alone, the king had his hands free to develop a new and loyal aristocracy to honour his absolute reign. The nobilities in Denmark and Norway could, likewise, bask in the glory of one of the most monarchial states in Europe. The title of count was introduced in 1671, and in 1709 and 1710, two marquisates (the only ones in Scandinavia) were created. Additionally, hundreds of families were ennobled, i.e., without titles. Demonstrating his omnipotence, the monarch could even revert noble status ab initio, as if ennoblement had never happened, and elevate dead humans to the estate of nobles. A rich aristocratic culture developed during this epoch, for example family names like Gyldenpalm (lit. 'Golden Palm'), Svanenhielm (lit. 'Swan Helm'), and Tordenskiold (lit. 'Thunder Shield'), many of them containing particles like French de and German von. Likewise, excessive creation of coats of arms boosted heraldic culture and praxis, including visual arts.

The 1814 Constitution forbade the creation of new nobility, including countships, baronies, family estates, and fee tails. The 1821 Nobility Law initiated a long-range abolition of the nobility as an official estate, a process in which current bearers were allowed to keep their status and possible titles as well as some privileges for the rest of their lifetime. The last legally noble Norwegians died in the early 20th century. Many Norwegians who had noble status in Norway had it in Denmark, too, where they remained officially noble.

During the 19th century, members of noble families continued to hold political and social power, for example Severin Løvenskiold as Governor-General of Norway and Peder Anker and Mathias Sommerhielm as Prime Minister. Aristocrats were active in Norway's independence movement in 1905, and it has been claimed the union with Sweden was dissolved thanks to a 'genuinely aristocratic wave'. Fritz Wedel Jarlsberg's personal efforts contributed to Norway gaining sovereignty of the arctic archipelago Svalbard in 1920. From 1912 to 1918, Bredo Henrik von Munthe af Morgenstierne was Rector of the University of Oslo. When Norway co-founded and entered NATO, ambassador Wilhelm Morgenstierne represented the kingdom when US President Truman signed the treaty in 1949. Whilst they now acted as individuals rather than a unified estate, these and many other noblemen played a significant public role, mainly until the Second World War (1940–1945).

Today, Norway has approximately 10-15 families who were formerly recognised as noble by Norwegian kings. These include Anker, Aubert, von Benzon, Bretteville, Falsen, Galtung, Huitfeldt, Knagenhjelm, Lowzow, Løvenskiold, Munthe-Kaas, von Munthe af Morgenstierne, de Vibe, Treschow, Werenskiold, and the Counts of Wedel-Jarlsberg. In addition, there are non-noble families who descend patrilineally from individuals who once had personal (non-hereditary) noble status, for example the Paus family and several families of the void ab initio office nobility. There is even foreign nobility in Norway, mainly Norwegian families originating in other countries and who have or had noble status there.

== Primeval aristocracy ==
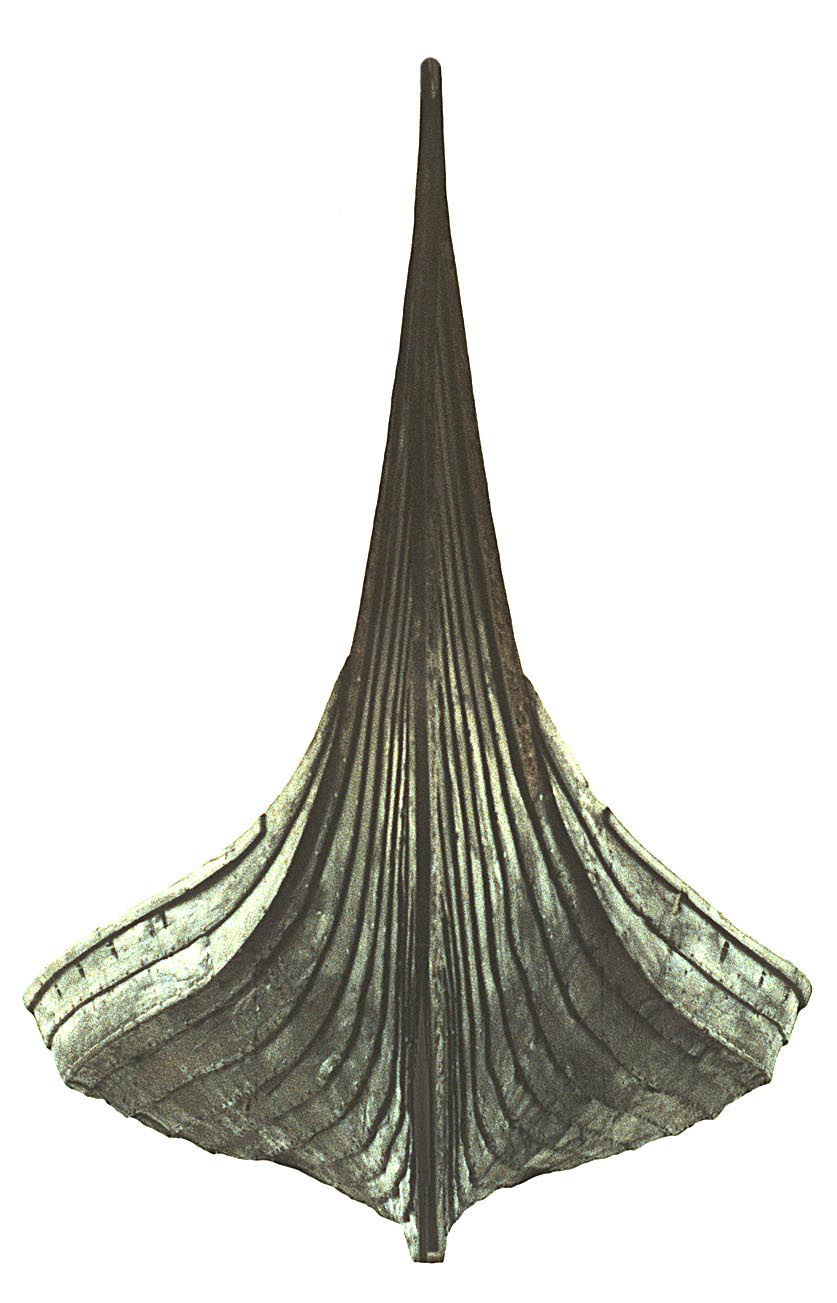
The Oseberg ship was part of a 9th-century burial.

=== Genesis ===
The earliest times in today's Norway (c. 10000 BC – c. 1800 BC) had a relatively flat social structure, often based on kinship. People were hunters and gatherers who moved over distances in small parties.

However, in the latest part of the Stone Age, some time around 4000 BC, permanent settlements were established in gradually increasing numbers. Before and parallelly with the introduction of agriculture c. 2500 BC, hunter-gatherer societies became larger tribute societies with elements of stratification. Transition to agriculture was both a condition and a trigger for the genesis of the very first aristocracy on the Scandinavian Peninsula. The first aristocracy known in archaeology appeared no later than c. 1500 BC.

Comparatively, transition to agriculture happened c. 9000 BC in the Fertile Crescent and c. 4000 BC in the British Isles. The most obvious reason for Scandinavia's relatively late transition is the Weichsel glaciation, i.e. the latest ice age. Norway was almost wholly covered by ice until c. 7000 BC, and most of the ice sheet was not melted until c. 6000 BC.

=== Bronze Age ===
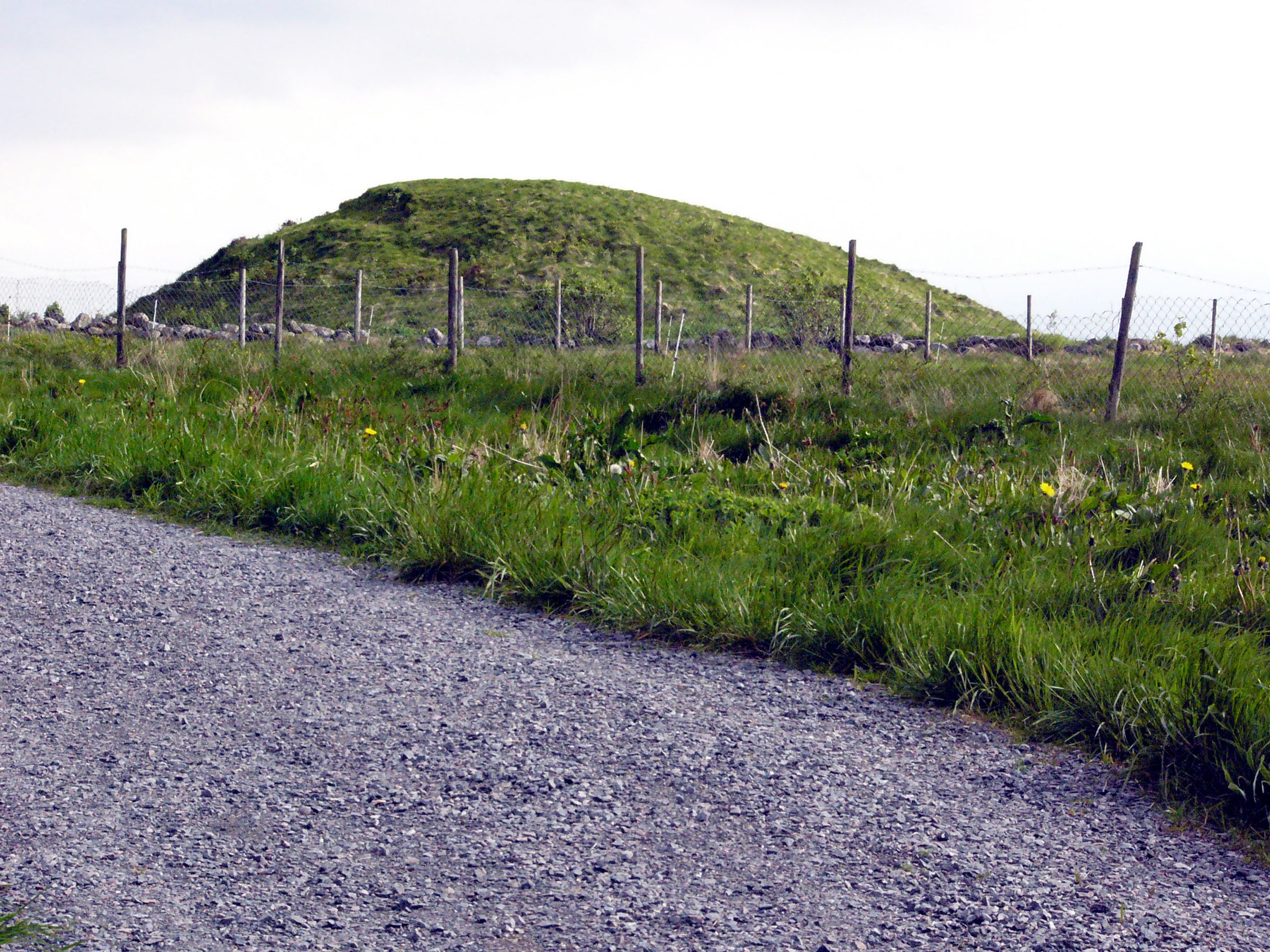
Burial mound in Western Norway.

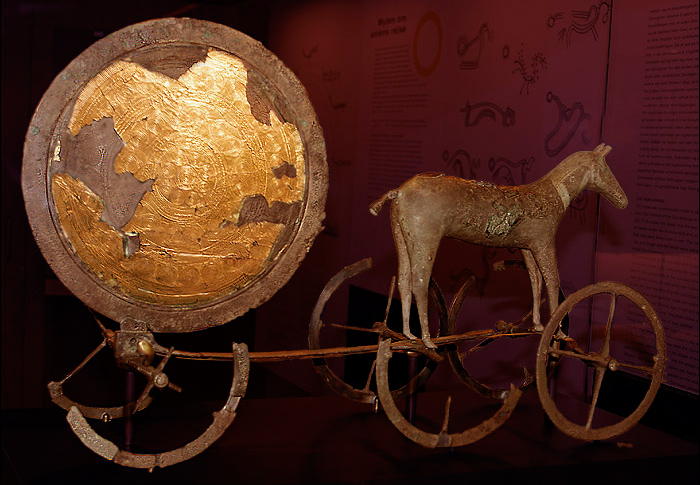
The Sun Chariot, Denmark, confirms consumption of luxury goods.

The first known aristocracy in today's Norway existed in the Bronze Age (c. 1800 BC – c. 500 BC) and no later than c. 1500 BC. For this reason, it is called a bronze aristocracy (Norwegian: bronsearistokrati). During this age, settlements became more divided into classes as a new dimension appeared: socio-economical differences.

Based on access to and physical control of natural resources, such as furs, walrus teeth, and other goods that were desired by foreigners, a social élite was able to acquire foreign metals. Bronze is essential in this regard. By importing bronze, which they also established a monopoly on, leading persons and their families would not only express their power but even strengthen and increase it. Bronze was also militarily important. It enabled a limited number of possessors to make weapons stronger than those of stone, and unlike the latter, broken bronze weapons could be melted and reshaped. Common people continued to use tools and weapons of stone during the whole age.

Through trade and cultural exchange, the bronze aristocracy was part of the contemporary civilisation in Europe, despite being placed in the geographical outskirts of it. Continental impulses, for example new religious customs and decorative design, arrived relatively early.

Although there was an established aristocracy, the pyramidal social structure is not similar to the feudal system of the much later Medieval Age. Beside other factors, it has been suggested that agricultural production was insufficient to supply an élite that itself did not participate. In general, it is considered as unlikely that the élite possessed total power. Furthermore, power may not only have been based on weapons. Also religious and ancestral factors are important when explaining how certain persons or families managed to maintain authority for generations. For example, impressive burial mounds could consolidate imaginations of a clan's right to an area.

The bronze aristocracy is known primarily through burial mounds, for example a mound (c. 1200 BC) in Jåsund, Western Norway, where an apparently mighty man was buried together with a big bronze sword. Other mounds were filled with bronze weapons and bronze artefacts, for example rings, necklaces, and decorative daggers. The biggest mounds could be up to 8–9 metres in height and 40 metres in diameter. A construction like this required the work of ten men for about four weeks.

The bronze aristocracy faced a challenge when the position of bronze was taken over by iron. Unlike bronze, which remained an aristocratically controlled metal through the whole age, iron was found in rich amounts in the nature, especially in bogs, and was thus owned and used by broader layers of the population.

=== Early and Late Iron Age ===
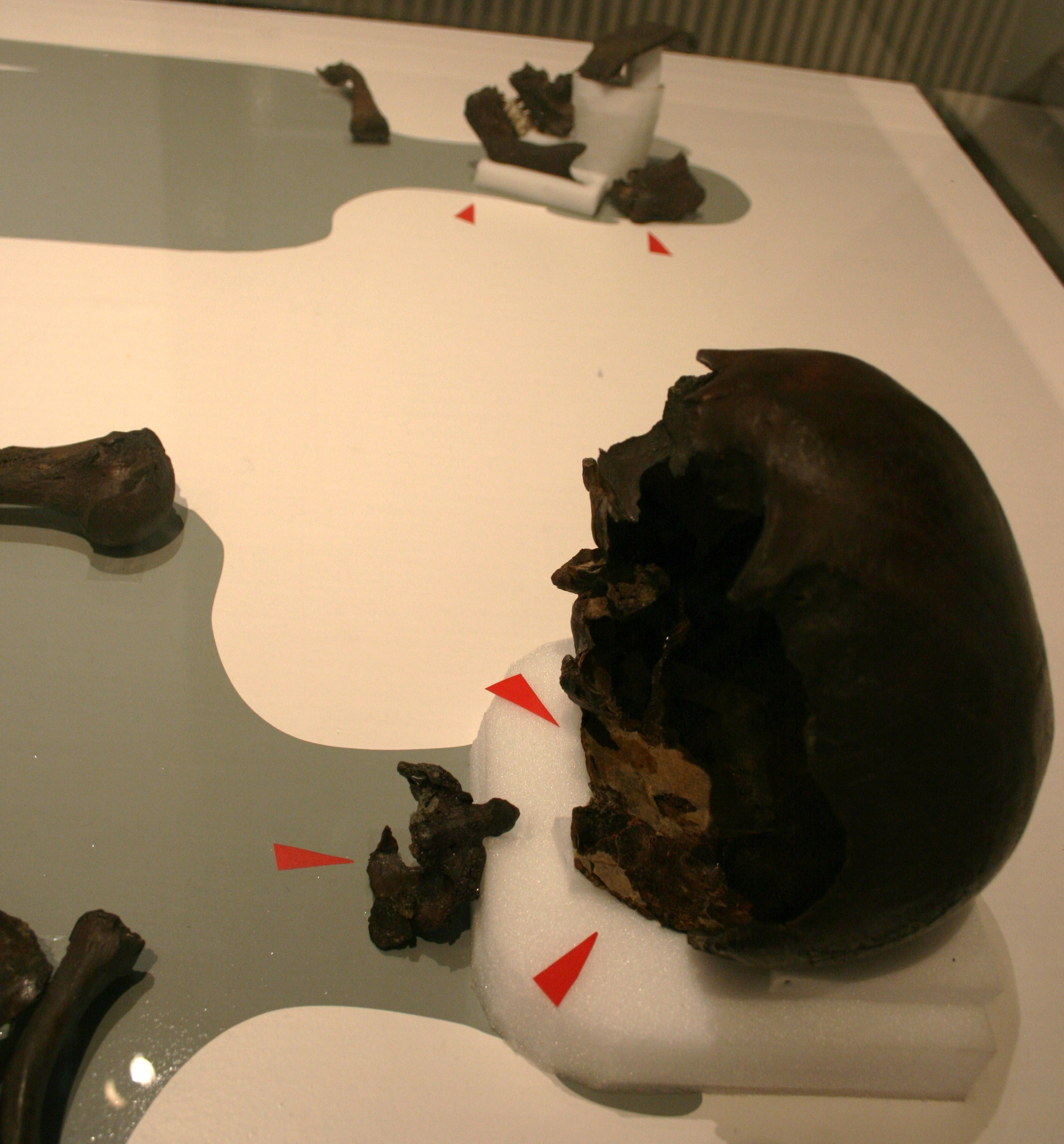
Oseberg skeletal remains of an aristocrat and perhaps her female servant or slave.

Archaeological examination of graves of the Early Iron Age (c. 400 BC – c. AD 500) has revealed three distinct social strata. Ordinary farmers were cremated and buried in simple, flat graves. (Whilst this sort of burial had existed in the Bronze Age, too, the cremation part was a recently imported custom from Continental Europe—and not imposed on ordinary farmers in particular.) Grand farmers and aristocrats were buried together with grave goods, while chieftains were buried in mounds. Grave goods of this age are dominated by iron artefacts.

In this age, the aristocracy had begun to enslave humans. The use of forced labor in agricultural production made the aristocracy able to spend more resources on military activities, increasing their capacity to control their tax-paying subjects, to defend their territory, and even to expand it. However, thralls were not an aristocratic privilege. In principle, all free men could hold thralls. A thrall was the rightless property of his or her owner. The text Rígsþula identifies three distinct classes and describes extensively how they evolved: chieftains, farmers, and thralls. Religion was used to explain and justify thralldom, but the original motivation was rather economical.

Furthermore, the aristocracy sacrificed humans to be placed in graves of deceased aristocrats. Also this custom was related to religion, i.e. imaginations of life after death. Contemporary sources as well as archaeological remains document this custom. For example, Arab traveller Ahmad ibn Fadlan (fl. 10th century) documented that a female slave was killed for this purpose in a Nordic burial in Russia.

At the beginning of the Late Iron Age (c. 500 – c. 793; in Norway known as the Merovingian Age), there were several changes in Nordic culture: for example the deterioration of the quality of works of art and syncopation of the spoken language. Burial customs in several regions were drastically simplified: stone coffins (stones placed together as a coffin protecting the body within a grave or a tumulus) were no longer used, and tumuli became smaller or were replaced by flat graves. Also grave goods appear to have been lesser in amount than before.

Some historians have interpreted these changes negatively. Some suggest that they were caused by plague or interregional conflict, while others believe that the smaller number of tumuli reflects the consolidation of aristocratic power, which meant that large and splendid monuments were no longer necessary.

=== Hird ===
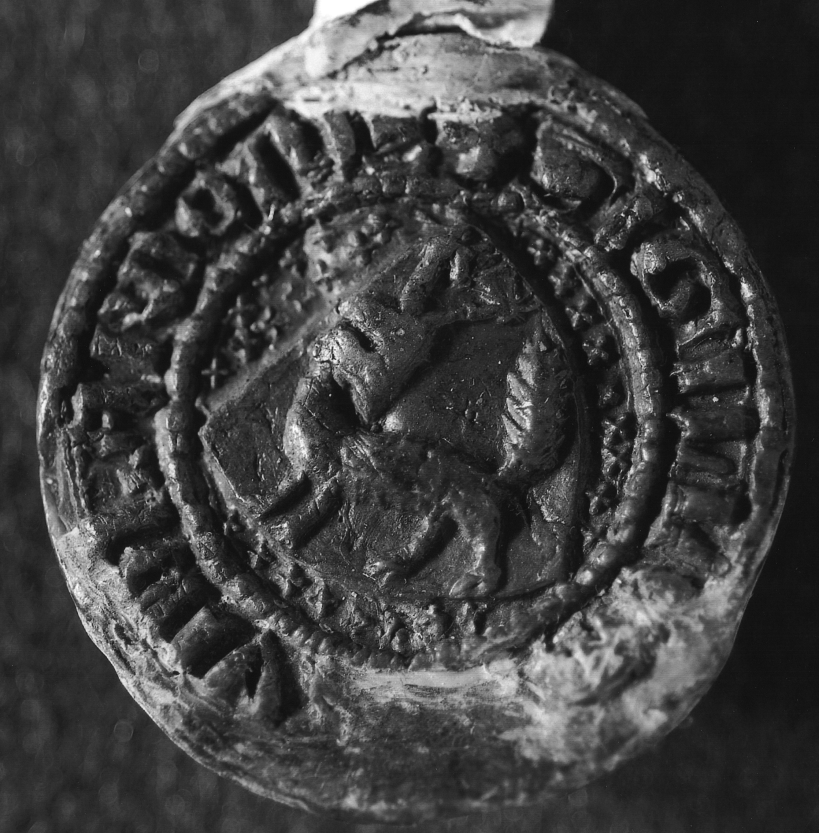
Seal of 14th-century Sysselmann Jørund Arnason.

The hird was divided into three classes, of which the first had three ranks. The first class was hirdmann with lendmann as the 1st rank, skutilsvein as the 2nd rank, and ordinary hirdmann as the 3rd rank. Below them were the classes gjest and kjertesvein.

Lendmen, having the first rank in the group of hirdmen, had the right to hold 40 armed housecarls, to advise the king, and to receive an annual payment from the king. They normally also held the highest offices in the state. The foundation for their rights was the military duty which their title imposed.

Kjertesveins were young men of good family who served as pages at the court, and gjests constituted a guard and police corps. In addition, there was a fourth group known as housecarls, but it remains uncertain whether they were considered a part of or rather served the hird.

The hird's organisation is described in the King’s Mirror and the Codex of the Hird.

The system of hirdmen—regional and local representatives for the king—was stronger and lasted longer in the tributary lands Shetland, Orkney, Iceland, and the Faroe Islands, and also in Jemtland, originally an independent farmer republic which Norwegian kings used much time and efforts to gain control over.

=== Knighthood ===
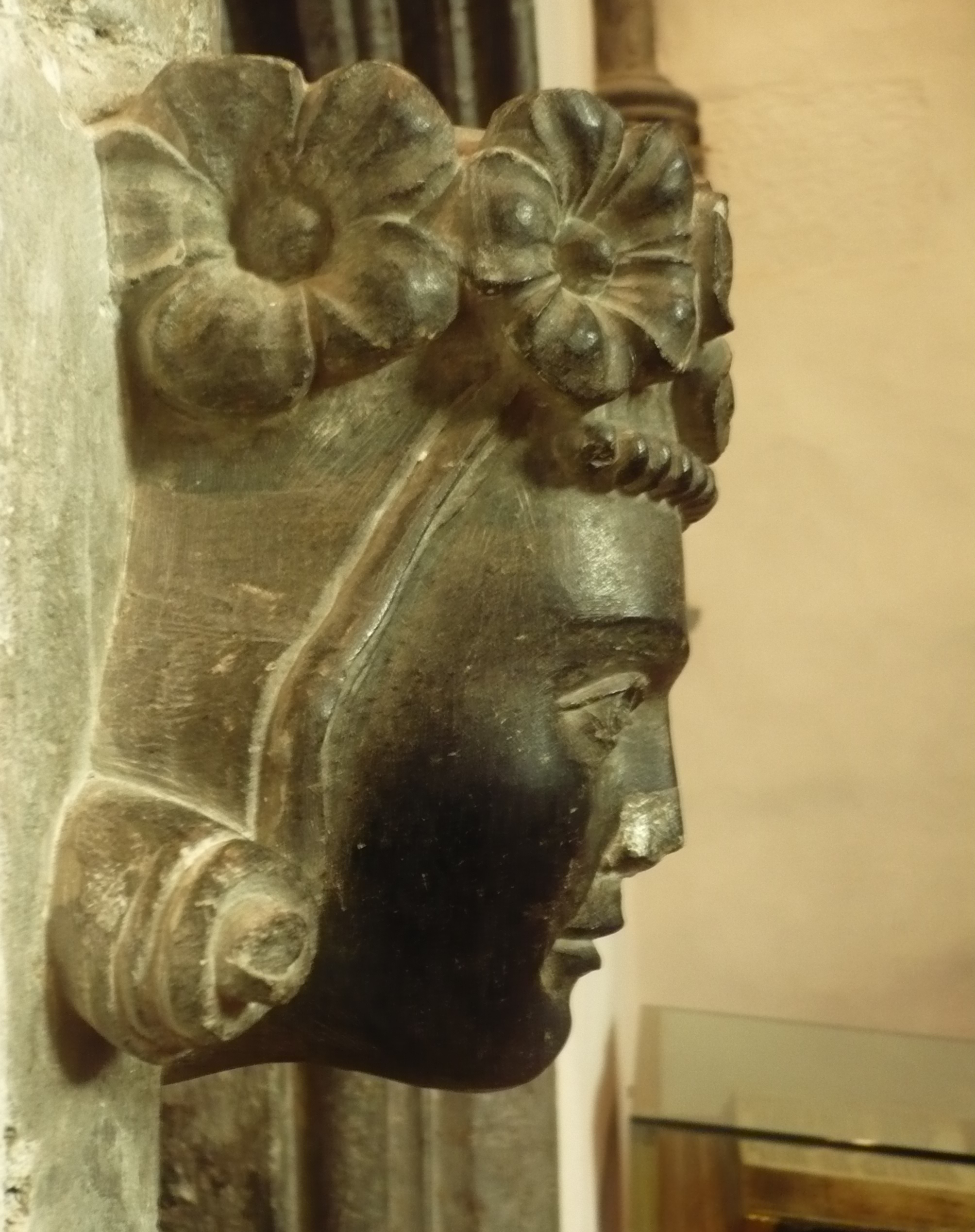
Sculpture of Haakon Magnusson, Duke of Oslo, of Oppland, of Ryfylke, of the Faroe Islands, and of Shetland; later Haakon V.

During the second half of the 13th century continental European court culture began to gain influence in Norway. In 1277 King Magnus VI introduced continental titles in the hird: lendmen were called barons, and skutilsveins were called ridder. Both were then styled Herr (English: Lord). In 1308 King Håkon V abolished the lendman/baron institution, and it was probably also during his reign that the aristocracy seems to have been restructured into two classes: ridder (English: knight) and væpner (English: squire).

It is difficult to determinate exactly how many knights and squires there were in the 14th and the early 15th century. When King Haakon V signed a peace treaty with the Danish king in 1309, it was sealed by 29 Norwegian knights and squires. King Haakon promised that additional 270 knights and squires would give their written recognition. This were perhaps the approximate number of knights and squires at this time.

=== Fiefs and fortresses ===
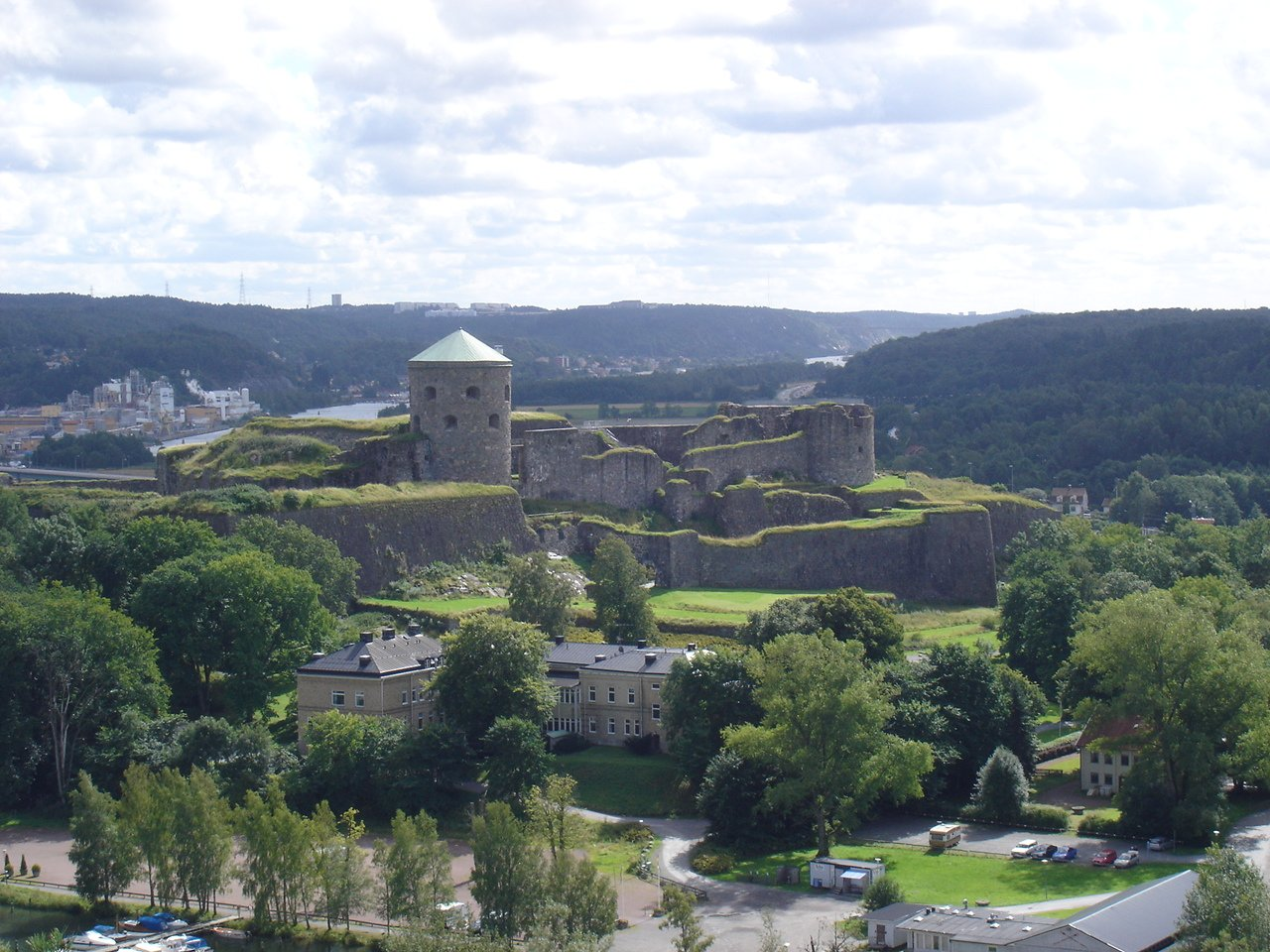
The Båhus Fortress.

The system of royally controlled fiefs was established in 1308, replacing the originally more independent lendmen. There were two types of medieval fiefs:

To the first belonged castle fiefs (Norwegian: slottslen) or main fiefs (Norwegian: hovedlen), to which the king appointed lords, and under them petty fiefs (Norwegian: smålen), which had varying connections with their respective castle fief. In the 15th century, there were approximately fifty fiefs in Norway. In the late 16th century and the early 17th century, there were four permanent castle fiefs and approximately thirty small. Thereafter, the number of petty fiefs was reduced in favour of bigger and more stable main fiefs. Lords of castle fief resided in the biggest cities, where the royal farms or the castles were located.

The second type were estate fiefs (Norwegian: godslen), i.e. private, noble estates that constituted independent areas of jurisdiction.

Likewise, nobles were active in the kingdom's military defence, in which fortresses had a central position. In the early 14th century, the Fortress of Vardøhus in Northern Norway was constructed due to conflicts with the Russian Republic of Novgorod and as protection against robbery raids of the Karelians. The fortresses Bohus and Akershus in Eastern Norway were established approximately at the same time. An earlier fortress was Bergenhus in Western Norway. There would usually be one or more fiefs attached to each fortress. All fortresses were mainly under the command of nobles, who held the military title of høvedsmann.

=== Black Death ===
The Black Death, which came to Norway around 1349, was bad for the nobility. In addition to the loss of their own members, about two thirds of the population were killed by the plague, and the reduction in available manpower for agriculture caused an economic crisis.

The aristocracy was reduced from about 600 families or 3,600 people before 1350 to about 200 families or 1,000 people in 1450.

The value of land was reduced by 50%–75%, and the land rent was reduced by up to 75%, except in relatively populous central districts like Akershus and Båhus, where the reduction was about 40%. The tithe also reduced by 60%–70%.

Both before and after the plague, Norwegian noblemen were unusually dependent on the king compared with noblemen in other countries. Mountainous Norway has never been conducive to large land estates of continental size. As a consequence of the tremendous reduction in land-related income following the plague, it became even more necessary than before to enter royal service.

Militarily, the Black Death was a catastrophe. As lower and local noblemen were killed by the plague, the recruitment of officers and troop leaders was equally reduced. Having lost their economic base (reduced income of taxes etc.) and their economic guarantees from the king, local aristocrats could often not fulfil their military duties.

=== Time of greatness ===
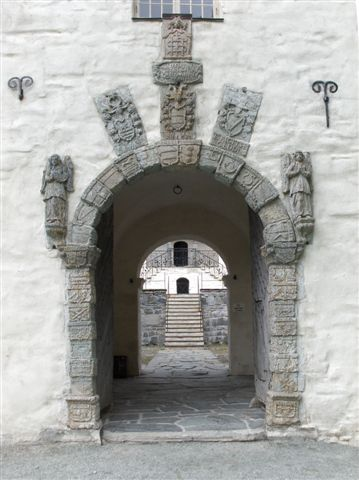
Austrått Fortress.

During the 14th century members of the hird continued in various directions. The lower parts of the hird lost importance and disappeared. The upper parts, especially the former lendmen, became the nucleus of the nobility of the High Medieval Age: the knighthood (Norwegian: Ridderskapet). They stood close to the king, and as such they received seats in the Council of the Kingdom as well as fiefs, and some had even family connections to the royal house. There was a significant social distance between the knighthood and ordinary noblemen.

The Council of the Kingdom was the kingdom's governing institution, consisting of members of the upper secular and the upper clerical aristocracy, including the Archbishop. Originally, in the 13th century, having had an advisory function as the king's council, the Council became remarkably independent from the king during the 15th century. At its height it had the power to choose or to recognise pretenders to the throne, and it demanded an electoral charter from each new king. Sometimes it even chose its own leaders as regents (Norwegian: drottsete or riksforstander), among others Sigurd Jonsson (Stjerne) to Sudreim and Jon Svaleson (Smør).

In Norway as well as in Denmark and Sweden, it was in this period that the idea and the principle of riksråd constitutionalism had arisen, i.e. that the council was considered as the real foundation of sovereignty. Although kings were formal heads of state, the council was powerful. Their power and active rulership, especially as regents, have caused historians characterise this state as de facto a republic of the nobility (Norwegian: adelsrepublikk).

This aristocratic power lasted until the Reformation, when the king in 1536 illegally abolished the council. The reign of aristocrats was over when Archbishop Olav Engelbrektsson, who was also noble, the council's president and the Regent of Norway, left the kingdom in 1537.

=== Between reformation and absolutism ===
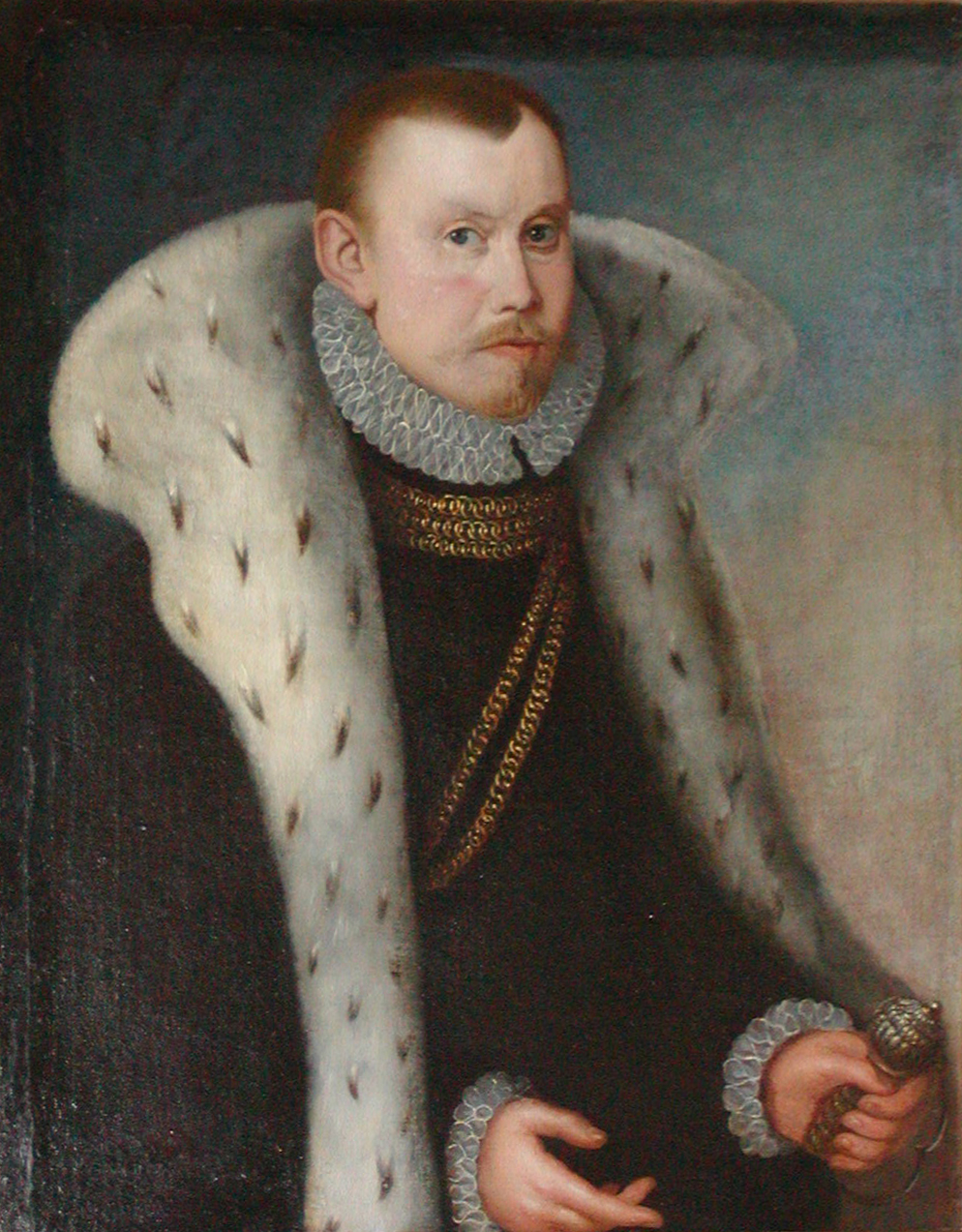
Ludvig Ludvigsen Munk of Nørholm.

Following the abolition of the Norwegian Council of the Kingdom in 1536, which de facto ceased to exist in 1537, the nobility in Norway lost most of its formal political foundation. The Danish Council of the Kingdom took over the governing of Norway. However, the nobility in Norway, now confined to more administrative and ceremonial functions, continued to take part in the country's official life, especially at homages to new kings.

Having defeated the aristocratic and besides Roman Catholic resistance in Norway, the king in Copenhagen sought to secure and consolidate his control in the kingdom. Strategical actions would further weaken the nobility in Norway.

First of all, the king sent Danish noblemen to Norway in order to administer the country and to fill civilian and military offices. Norwegian noblemen were deliberately under-represented when new high officials were appointed. Whilst this was a part of the king's tactics, also the lack of Norwegian noblemen with qualified education—Norway did not have a university—was a reason why the king had to send foreigners. The educational sector was considerably better developed in Sleswick and Holsatia, plus in Germany, so only nobles who sent their children to foreign universities could hope to keep or obtain high offices.

Secondly, during the 16th century the system of independent, family-possessed estates as power centres, like Austrått, was ultimately replaced in favour of fiefs to which the king himself appointed lords. A few Norwegian noblemen were given such fiefs, for example Knight Trond Torleivsson Benkestok, Lord to Bergenhus Fortress, but over time these came to be held almost exclusively by immigrants. Nevertheless, during the 17th century fiefs were transformed into high offices. Also they were considered too risky for the king.

Thirdly, in 1628 the king instituted a national army of soldiers recruited directly from the estate of farmers. At the same time technical development made traditional military methods outdated. As a result, the nobility lost its military function.

=== Absolutism ===
In 1660, when Denmark's estates were gathered in Copenhagen, King Frederick III declared military state of emergency and closed the capital city, thus preventing the nobility from boycotting the assembly by leaving. The nobility was forced to surrender. In the following days, Denmark was transformed from an elective monarchy into a hereditary one. On 17 October, the 1648 håndfestning was returned to the king, and on 18 October, the king was hailed as a hereditary monarch. On 10 January 1661, the Absolute and Hereditary Monarchy Act (Norwegian: Enevoldsarveregjeringsakten) introduced absolutism. In Denmark, the Council of the Kingdom faced the same destiny as the Norwegian Council had done in 1536: abolition. The noble monarchy (Norwegian: adelsmonarki) had come to an end.

Formally a hereditary kingdom since old ages, Norway was not affected by Denmark's transition to the same. However, also Norway was affected by absolutism. On 7 August 1661 in Christiania, representatives of the Norwegian nobility signed the Sovereignty Act.

=== Extinction ===
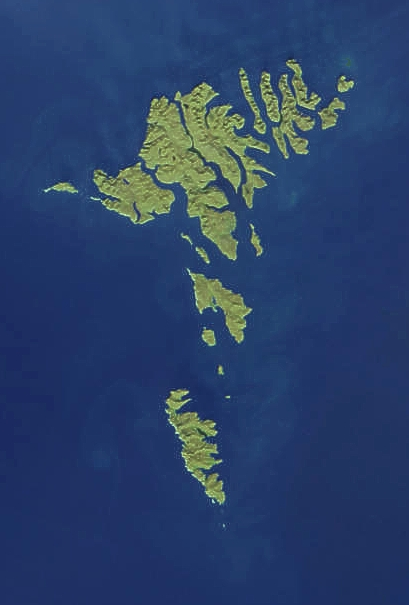
The Faroe Islands in Norway.

The native aristocracy was reduced during the last part of the Late Medieval Age, but not as much as previously believed. Several factors may explain this.

It was a common misunderstanding that noble status was only transmitted through sons, while in reality, noble status was inherited according to the specifications in each single patent of nobility which in a great number of patents of nobility included all descendants, through both female and male lineage, thus the lack of men did not lead to noble families’ extinction, but were in a large number of cases instead carried on through their daughters.

This precaution was put in place as seen in most of the earliest patents of nobility issued in Norway by King Eric of Pommerania, and later re-introduced by those kings who wished to ensure their descendants never ran out of nobles to defend them. Since noblemen as warriors were exposed to greater risks than the population in general and therefore died in a young age and often without issue. Thus, by including all descendants through both male and female lines, those of the kings who regularly incorporated the descendants through female lines, had the foresight to ensure the continuous birth of new nobles to defend their descendants as future kings.

For a brief period (after 1581 and 1582) unequal marriages could lead to the loss of noble status, noble estates, and similar, but only for those families who had received their patents after 1581 and 1582 as the king specifically refused to reduce any of the rights granted to older noble families by his predecessors. In an application to the king in 1591, the nobility requested that since it ‘[...] often [happens] that noblemen here in Norway marry unfree women, and their children inherit his estate, [...] which is a reduction and shame to the nobility [...]’, their children should not inherit noble status or noble estate.

It is also a factor that noble status was not automatically inherited. If a family for generations no longer provided services to the king, they could, due to oblivion, lose their position. An example is the Tordenstjerne family, whose members in the 16th century were squires, but who due to political and military inactivity in the 17th century had to get their noble status confirmed in the 18th century.

It is often claimed that the old nobility ‘died out’ in the Late Medieval Age. This is mostly but not entirely correct. The term ‘extinction’ includes not only families dying out physically, but also disappearance from the written sources of formerly noble families which had lost their political power and importance. This has even obscured the link between the such families before and in the 16th century and their farmer descendants who appear in sources beginning in the late 17th century. In other words, families of the old nobility may in actuality have survived without knowing it or being able to prove it.

The nobility of the 16th century was of a marginal size, thus being socially more exclusive, but also politically more vulnerable. For example, after the Reformation in 1537, the number of nobles was reduced from approximately 800 and to approximately 400, i.e. under 0.2 percent of the population and approximately 1/7 of the size of the Danish nobility. After 1537, only 15 percent of Norwegian land was in noble possession.

=== Women and women's rights ===
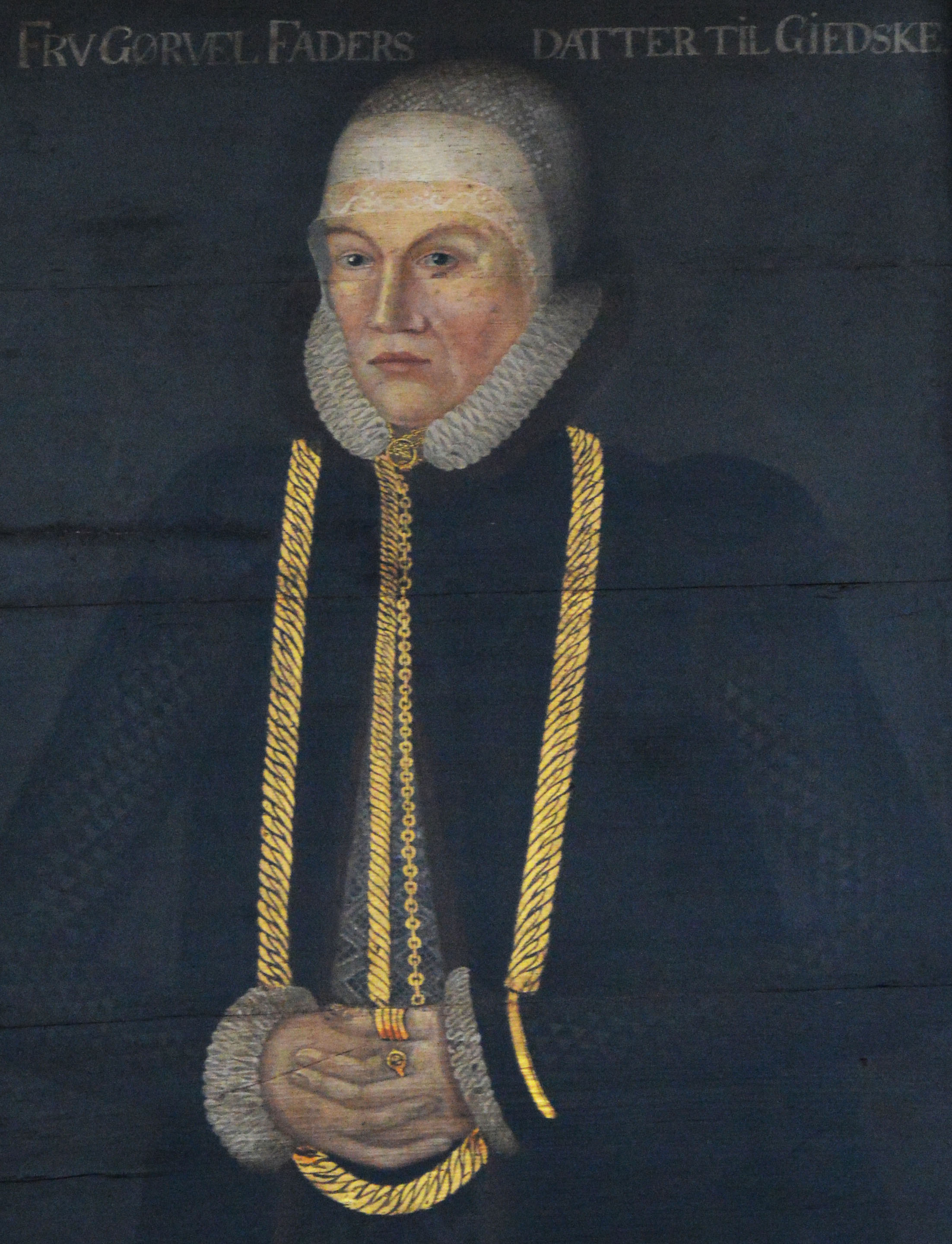
Gørvel Fadersdotter of Giske.

There are a few examples of medieval noblewomen who acted with considerable de facto independence. Prominent are Lady Ingegjerd Ottesdotter Rømer of Austrått and Lady Gørvel Fadersdotter (Sparre) of Giske. It is, however, important to know that they acted as so-called 'pseudo men', i.e. in the formal role of a man (usually their deceased husbands, fathers or brothers). Legally, there was no such thing as formal female roles.

In general, noblewomen had larger economical freedom than women of unfree estate. Whilst the Land Law of 1274 and the Town Law of 1276 gave farmer women and burgher women only limited control of their assets, noblewomen could buy and sell as much as they pleased. This estate-based discrimination would last until the Land Law (including the Norwegian Code of 1604, which was mostly a Danish translation) was replaced by the Norwegian Code of 1687, a law that made all non-widowed women legally minor, regardless of their birth. (Some minor restrictions were introduced in 1604, when Norwegian law, granting unmarried women financial independence from their 21st year, was adjusted to match Danish law, which imposed lifelong guardianship on women and their fortune.)

The noble privileges of 1582 decreed that a noblewoman who married a non-noble man should lose all her hereditary land to her nearest co-inheritor, for example her brother. The rule was designed with the intention of keeping noble land in noble hand, which would strengthen the nobility's power base.

== Medieval secular aristocracy overseas ==
Interpretation of the coat of arms of the Earl of Iceland. It derived partly from the Coat of arms of Norway and partly from that of the Icelandic Free State.

=== Faroe Islands ===
The hird in the Faroe Islands is mentioned for the last time in a document of 1479.

=== Iceland ===
In 1262, Gissur Þorvaldsson († 1268) was given the title Earl of Iceland, indicating and imposing that he should rule Iceland on behalf of Norway's king. It is known that approximately 20–30 Icelandic men had the title of knight in the following centuries, among others Eiríkur Sveinbjarnarson in Vatnsfjörður († 1342) and Arnfinnur Þorsteinsson († 1433).

In 1457, King Christian I ennobled Björn Þorleifsson. The same honour had been granted Torfi Arason in 1450. Björn was hirðstjóri (a high royal official) in Iceland and as well the richest man in this part of Norway.

In 1488, King John ennobled Eggert Eggertsson, Lawspeaker (Norwegian: lagmann) of Viken in mainland Norway. His son was Hans Eggertsson (fl. 1522), city administrator (Norwegian: rådmann) of Bergen, and the latter's son was Eggert Hansson, Lawspeaker (Icelandic: lögmaður) of Iceland (fl. 1517–1563). This family is known as Norbagge today.

In 1620 at the Althing, Jón Magnússon the Elder, let a letters patent of 1457 be read, originally given to his aforementioned ancestor Björn Þorleifsson. King Christian IV recognised his noble status. It is claimed that Jón was the last Norwegian nobleman in this part of Norway. The era of the nobility in Iceland ended in 1661 with the introduction of absolutism in Norway.

== Medieval secular aristocracy – clerical section ==
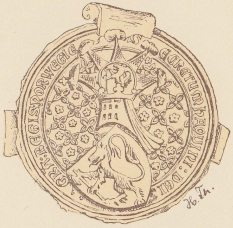
The Royal Seal of King Haakon VI. It contains the Coat of arms of Norway.

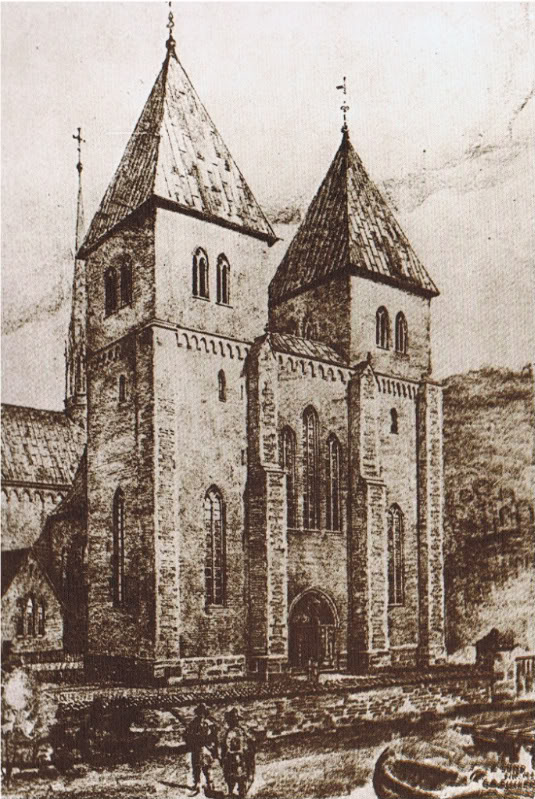
Attemptive reconstructional drawing of St Mary's Church.

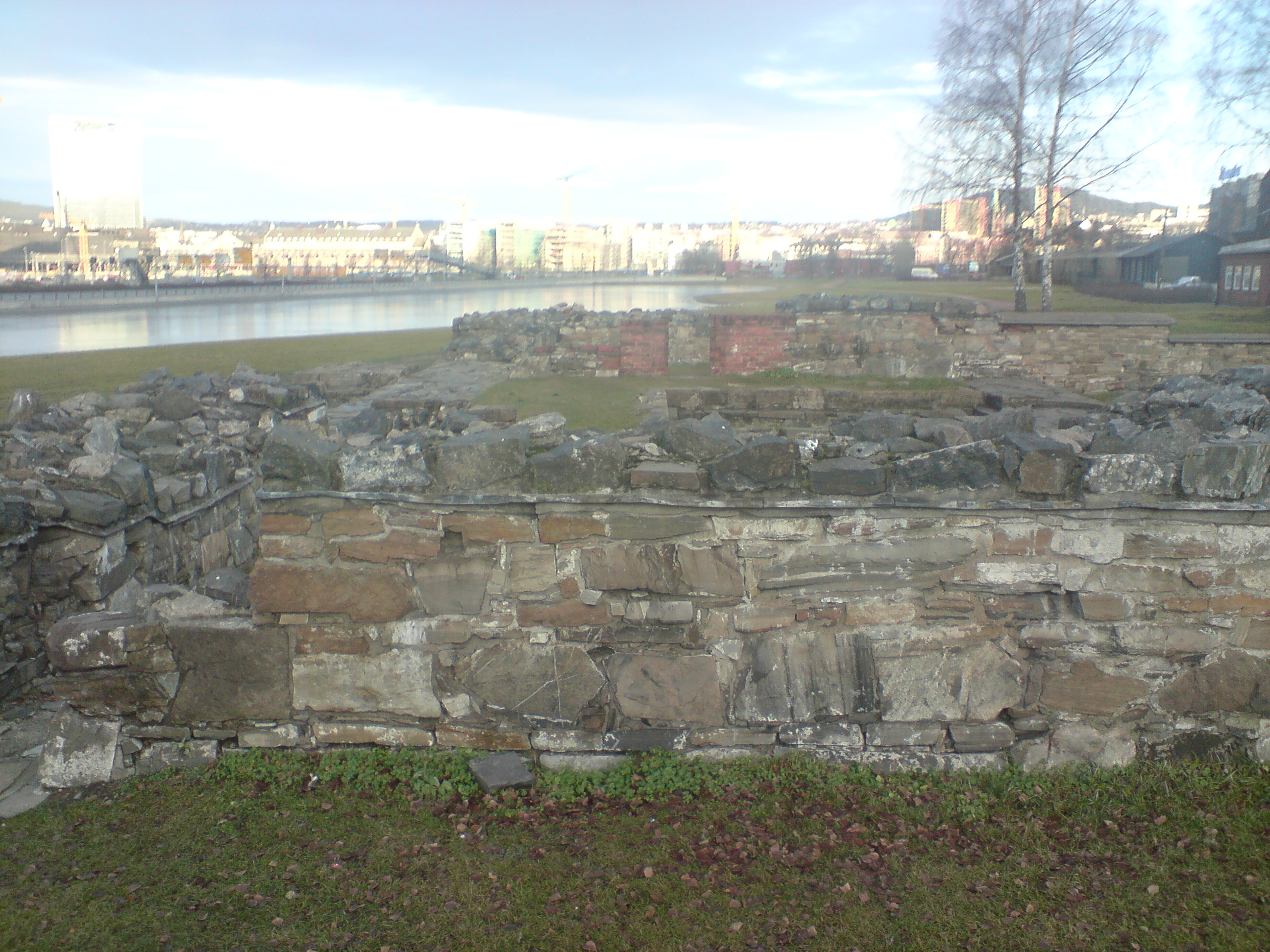
Remains of St Mary's Church.

Members of the royal clergy (Norwegian: kongelig kapellgeistlighet), i.e. the clergy of the king's own chapels, which were subordinate only to the king and largely independent of the Church hierarchy in Norway, belonged to the secular aristocracy by virtue of their offices in the service of the king.

In a royal proclamation of 22 June 1300 King Haakon V granted St Mary's Church, Oslo—the royal chapel—numerous privileges and decreed that "the learned man who is or becomes its dean" (i.e. the provost) ex officio would have the rank of a lendman, whilst priests with prebends (i.e. the canons) would have the rank of a Knight, the vicars and deacons would have the rank of an (ordinary) hirdmann, and other clerics would have the rank of a kjertesvein; the clergy of this church thus received extraordinarily high aristocratic ranks, according to Sverre Bagge.

In 1314 King Haakon decreed that the provost of St Mary's Church would also hold the office of Chancellor of Norway (Norwegian: Norges Rikes kansler) and Keeper of the Great Seal ‘for eternity’, and with some interruptions the office of chancellor was tied to the office of provost of St Mary's Church until some years after the Reformation in 1536. One of the other priests (typically a canon) would serve as vice-chancellor according to the royal letter. The main Great Seal was brought to Denmark in 1398, but the chancellor kept an older version of the seal that was used until the 16th century. The vicars of St Mary's Church probably had a higher position than elsewhere due to their extraordinary aristocratic rank. In 1348 King Haakon VI found it necessary to stress that the canons had higher rank in every aspect and they alone should administer the estate of their church.

St Mary's Church was an important political institution until the Reformation era, as it was the seat of government in Norway, although from the late 14th century effectively subordinate to the central government administration in Copenhagen and increasingly concerned only with matters relating to the legal field. Peter Andreas Munch has described the royal clergy as a counterweight to the (regular) secular aristocracy with a stronger loyalty to the king and a stronger service element than both the (regular) secular and the clerical aristocracy. The cathedral chapter of St Mary's Church ceased to exist as a separate institution when it was merged with the chapter of Oslo Cathedral in 1545, although its clergy retained their prebends.

Most of the royal clergy—especially those who rose to its upper echelons, such as canon and provost—were recruited from the lower nobility and sometimes even from the higher nobility.

In the years following the Reformation, this royal clergy gradually disappeared, as the entire church hierarchy came directly under the king's control. Some remnants of the institution survived for some time; for example the estate of the provost of St Mary's Church (Mariakirkens prostigods) was customarily given as a fief to the Chancellor of Norway until the 17th century.

Hans Olufsson (1500–1570), who was a canon at St Mary's Church before and after the Reformation and who held the prebend of Dillevik that included the income of 43 ecclesiastical properties, is regarded as the probable progenitor of the still extant Paus family.

== Medieval clerical aristocracy ==
Norwegian dioceses 1153–1387.

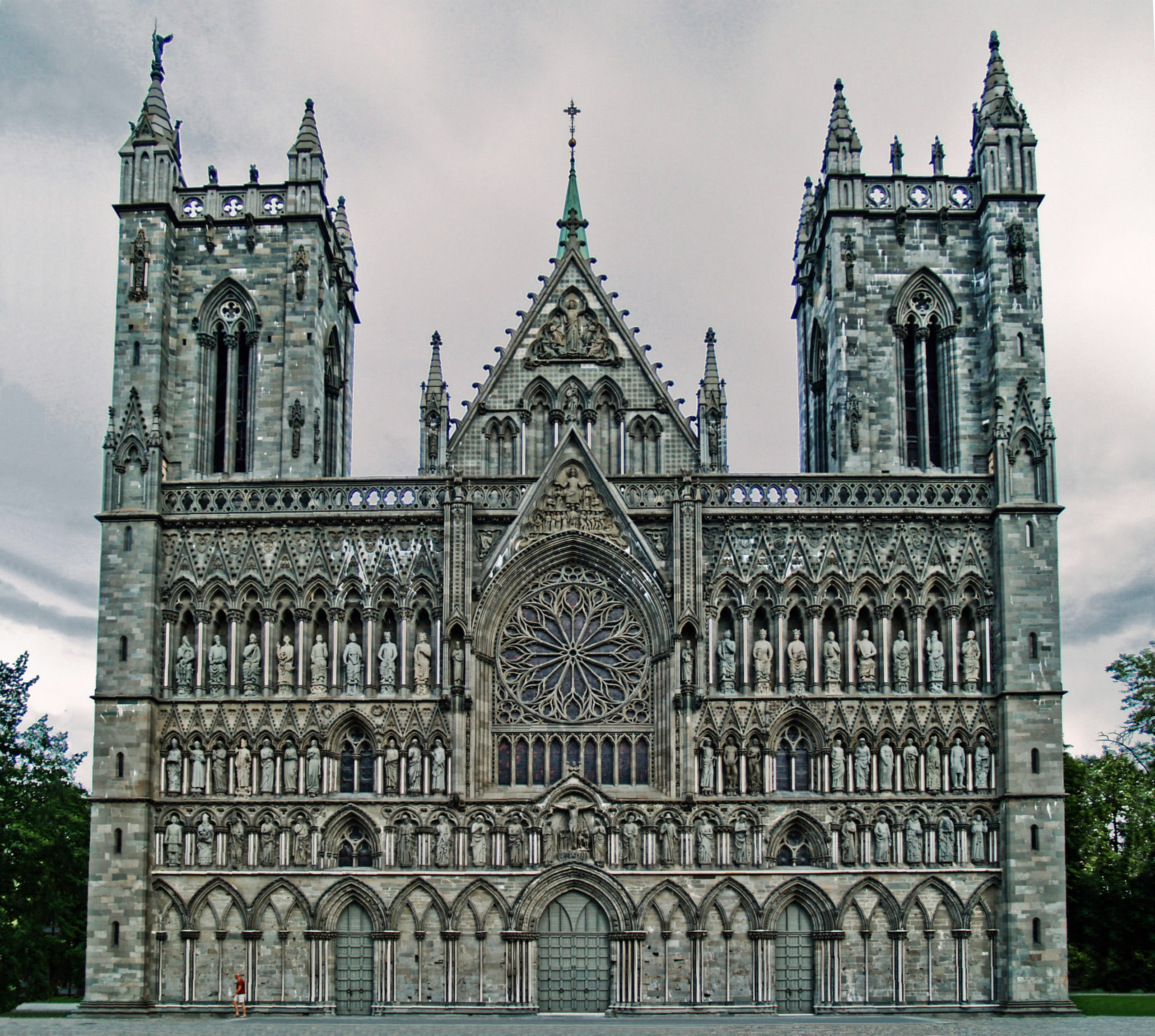
The Nidaros Cathedral.

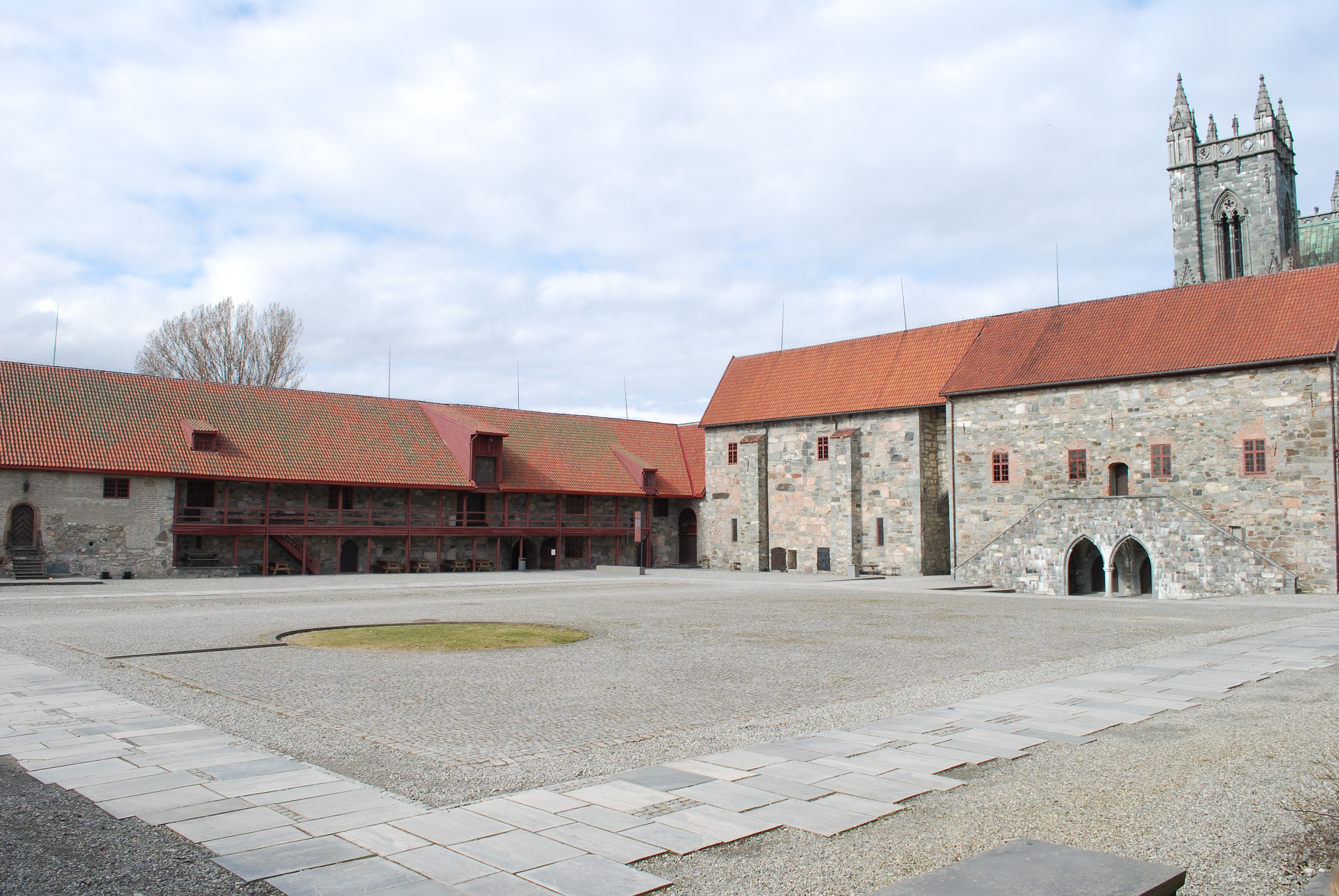
The Archbishop's palace in today's Trondheim.

The clergy (Norwegian: geistlighet) was one of normally three estates in the Norwegian feudal system. Together with the king and the secular aristocracy, the archbishop and the clerical aristocracy constituted the power class in the kingdom. Until the Reformation in 1536 this aristocracy operated and developed in parallel with the secular aristocracy.

It was in the years after the death of King Olaf the Holy in 1030 that Norway was finally Christianised, whereby the Church gradually began to play a political role. Already in 1163 the Law of Succession stated that Norwegian kings were no longer sovereign monarchs but vassals holding Norway as a fief from Saint Olaf alias the Eternal King of Norway. This development gave the Church greater control of the royal power, not least because the king had to proclaim loyalty to the Pope. King Magnus V (1156–1184) was as such the first of Norway's kings to use the style 'by the Grace of God'. Nevertheless, this law of succession would last only for a century, until a new law of succession, more independent for kings, was introduced.

The Church was actively involved in the civil war era (1130–1240), in which they were allies of the established aristocracy and supported throne pretenders who were (alleged) descendants of Olaf the Holy. Ultimately the Church supported Magnus Erlingsson (1156–1184), the son of Earl Erling Ormsson and Princess Kristin Sigurdsdotter.

In 1184, having defeated King Magnus, Sverre Sigurdsson became King of Norway. Subsequently, Sverre demanded that the archbishop should be subordinate to the king. As a result of this King Sverre was excommunicated. In Denmark exiled Archbishop Eirik, plus the majority of bishops, arranged a resistance movement known as the Baglers. They managed to re-occupy and control parts of Eastern Norway, from where they represented a permanent threat to King Sverre. Upon King Sverre's death in 1202 it became possible to find a compromise between Sverre's supporters, the Birchlegs, and the archbishop. In 1217 they managed to agree upon a king: King Haakon IV, a paternal grandson of King Sverre.

During the 13th century there were power struggles between the Church and the king. Several disagreements were temporarily solved with the Concordat of Tunsberg (Norwegian: Sættargjerden) of 1277. This concordat granted the clerical aristocracy several rights and privileges or confirmed existing ones, for example the freedom to trade and the freedom from paying lething. The same concordat gave the archbishop the right to have 100 sveins (armed pages), whilst each bishop could have 40.

=== Bishops ===
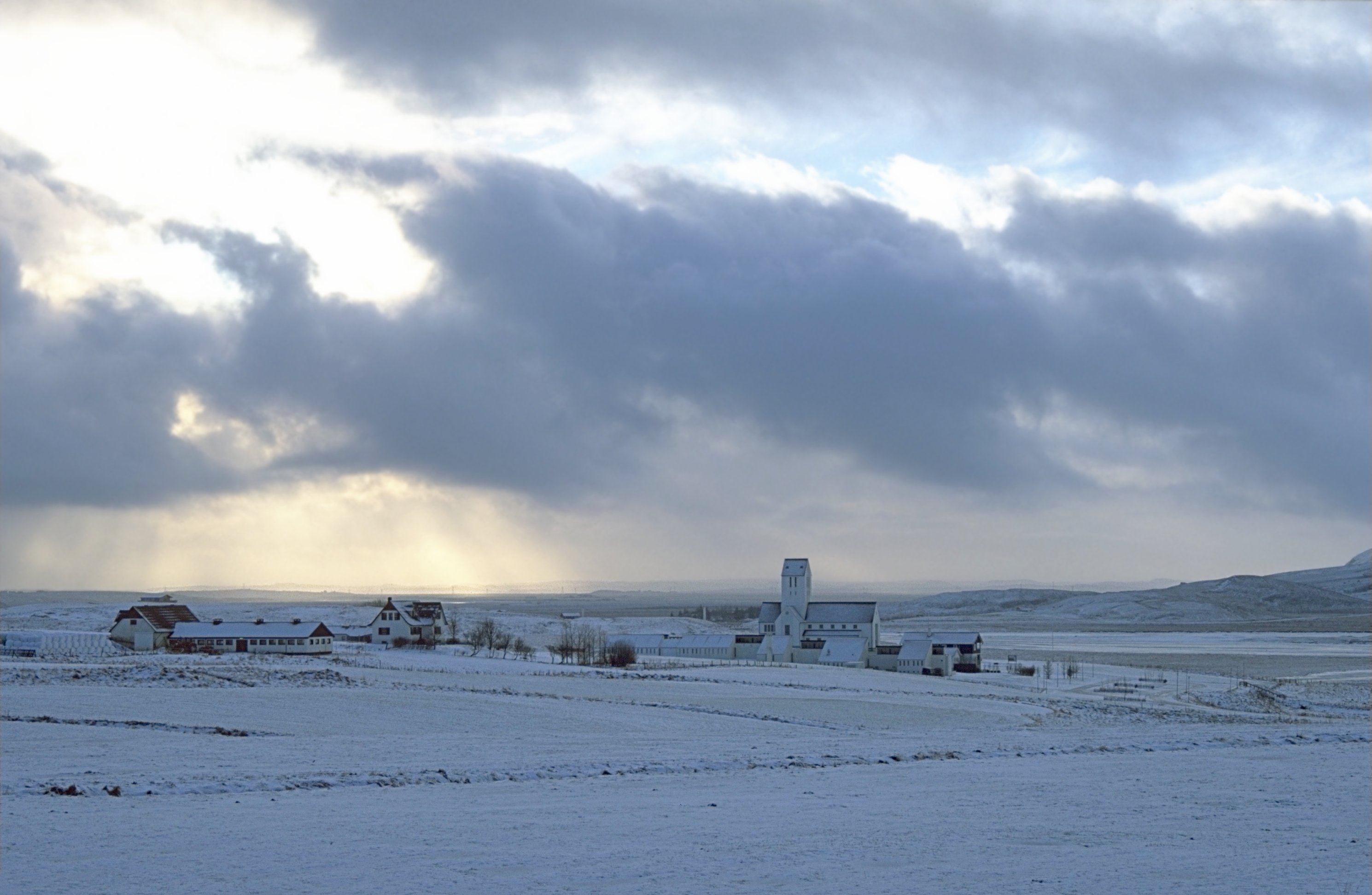
Skálholt, centre of the former Diocese of Skálholt.

There were ten bishops under the Archbishop of Nidaros, namely:

- Bishop of Bergen
- Bishop of Stavanger
- Bishop of Oslo
- Bishop of Hamar
- Bishop of Garðar (Greenland)
- Bishop of Skálholt (Iceland)
- Bishop of Hólar (Iceland)
- Bishop of Kirkjubøur (Faroe Islands)
- Bishop of Kirkwall (Orkney Islands)
- Bishop of Mann and the Isles (Mann and the Isles)

=== Canons ===
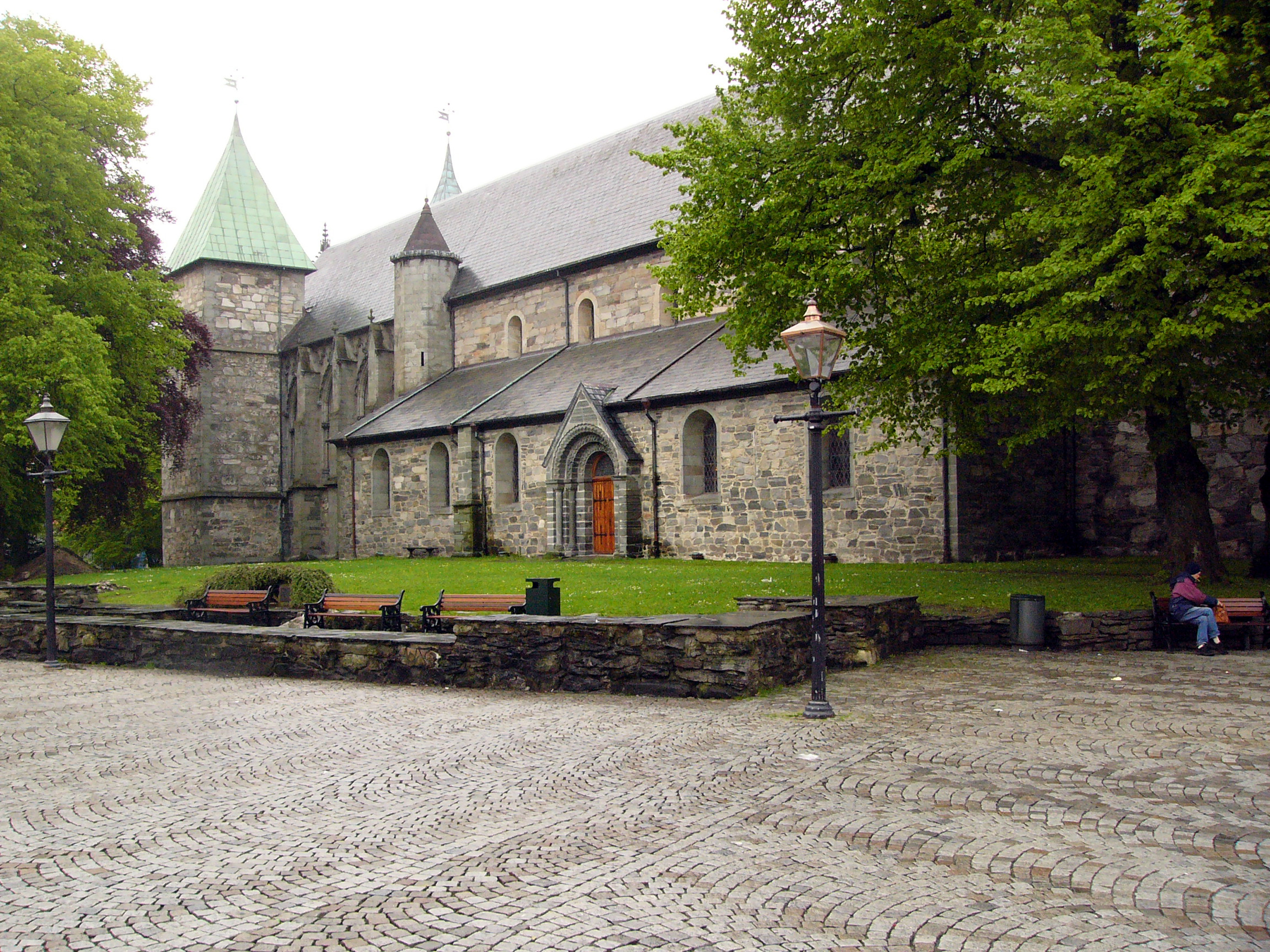
The Cathedral of Stavanger, former residence of the Bishop of Stavanger and twelve canons.

Canons (Norwegian: kannik) were priests who were also attached to one of the dioceses in Norway.

Canons were recruited primarily from the secular aristocracy. Whilst most canons came from the lower nobility, several belonged to the higher nobility by birth. The latter were sons of knights and even of Councillors of the Kingdom. Examples are Jakob Matsson of the Rømer family, Henrik Nilsson of the Gyldenløve family, and Elling Pedersson of the Oxe family.

In the 13th century canons were styled Sira (compare with English Sir).

=== Priests ===
Priests (Norwegian: prest) constituted the local level of the clergy.

Originally a style for canons in the 13th century, priests were styled Sira in and after the 14th century. Subsequently, Sira was replaced by Herr. Sira and Herr were used in combination with the given name only, e.g. 'Sira Eirik'.

=== Setesveins ===
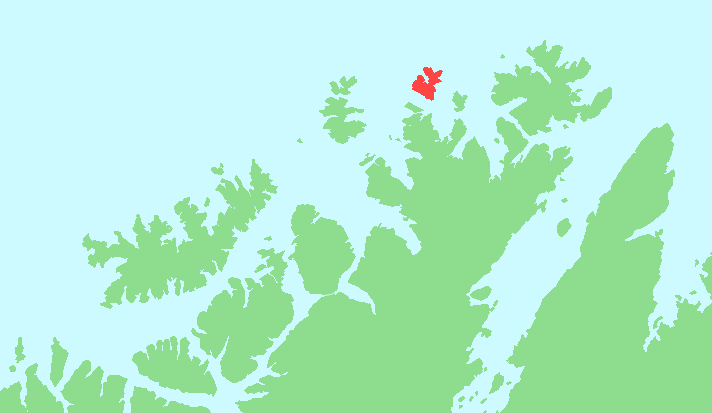
Hjelmsøya in Finnmark, where a setesvein named Sakse lived.

Beside the clerical hierarchy, the Archbishop of Nidaros had his own organisation of officers and servants.

Regional representatives of the Archbishop, setesveins (not to be confused with the noble title of skutilsvein) were seated mainly along the coast of Western and Northern Norway as well as in Iceland. A register of 1533 shows that there were at least 69 setesveins at this time. Their function was to administer the land estate of and to collect the taxes belonging to the Archbishop, and they also traded partly themselves and partly on behalf of the Archbishop. In Northern Norway, a typical location of setesveins was a central position with immediate control of the lucrative fisheries.

Some setesveins belonged to the secular aristocracy too, usually by birth.

After the Reformation in 1537, when King Christian III prohibited the Roman Catholic Church and the archbishop went into exile, the king punished setesveins who had supported the archbishop. Many of them had their houses robbed as the king and his soldiers raided the coast.

In Northern Norway ex-setesveins and their descendants were known as page nobility (Norwegian: knapeadel).

== Modern aristocracy ==
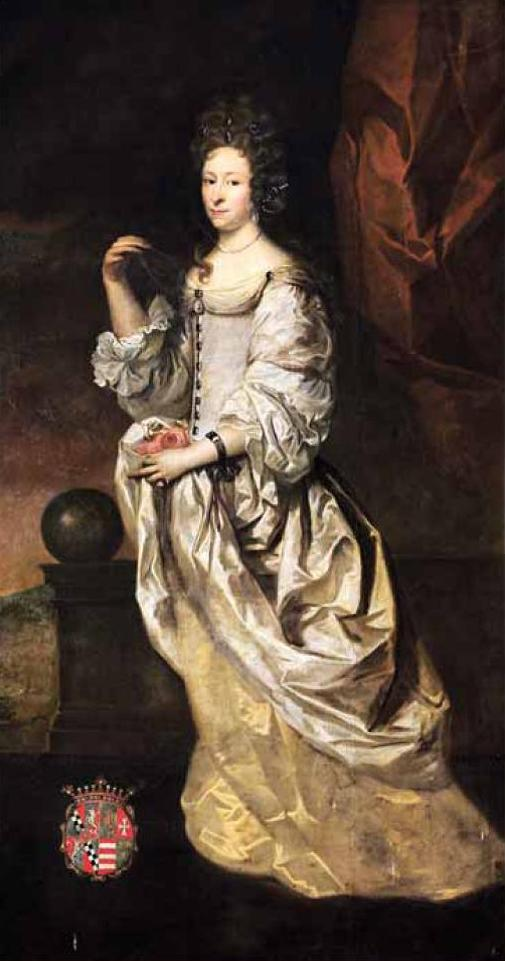
Karen Rosenkrantz, née Mowat.

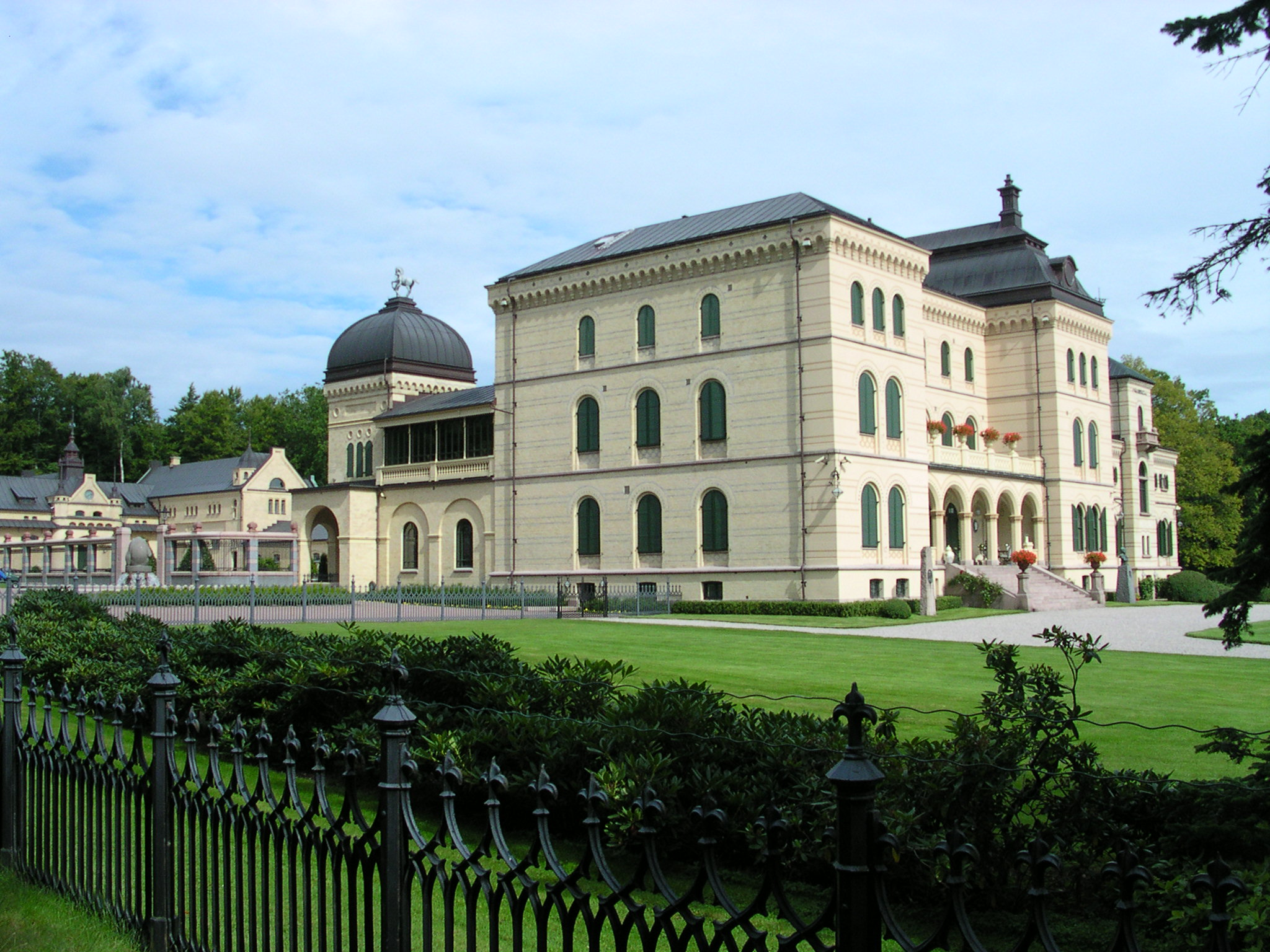
Fritzøehus, palace of the Treschow family.

The modern aristocracy is known as adel (English: nobility). The parts of the nobility that are regarded as new in Norway consisted of immigrant persons and families of the old nobility of Denmark, of recently ennobled persons and families in Norway as well as in Denmark, and of persons and families whose (claimed) noble status was confirmed or—for foreigners—naturalised by the king.

An absolute monarch since 1660, the king could ennoble and, for that matter, revoke the noble status of anyone he wished and—unlike earlier—without approval from the Council of the Kingdom. He could even elevate dead humans to the estate of nobles. For example, four days after his death in 1781, Hans Eilersen Hagerup was ennobled under the name de Gyldenpalm. This made as well his legitimate children and other patrilineal descendants noble.

In particular there were two ways of receiving noble status: via an office (informally known as office nobility) and via a letters patent (informally known as letter nobility).

On 25 May 1671 King Christian V created 31 counts and barons. As such two classes were created in addition to the class of nobles: the class of barons (Norwegian: friherrestand) and the class of counts (Norwegian: grevestand). A noble was per definition untitled, and barons and counts did not belong to the class of nobles, but to their respective classes. However, all three constituted the estate of nobles. Barons and counts could be either titular or feudal. The latter constituted the feudal nobility (Norwegian: lensadel). On 22 April 1709 King Frederick IV introduced the title of marquis.

The introduction of the titles of count and baron was controversial in the old nobility, who were old enemies of royal absolutism and whom the titles sought to outrank. One reaction was the anonymously published theatre play Comedy of the Count and the Baron, written in 1675.

=== Office nobility ===
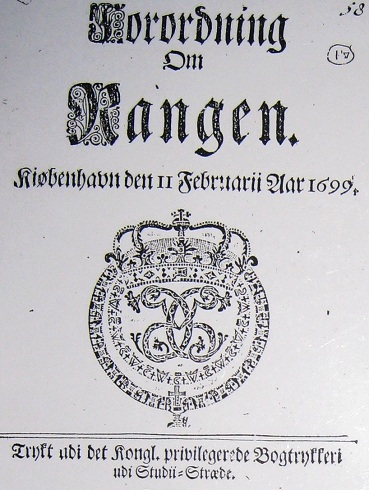
Copy of the front of the Decree on the Order of Precedence of 1699.

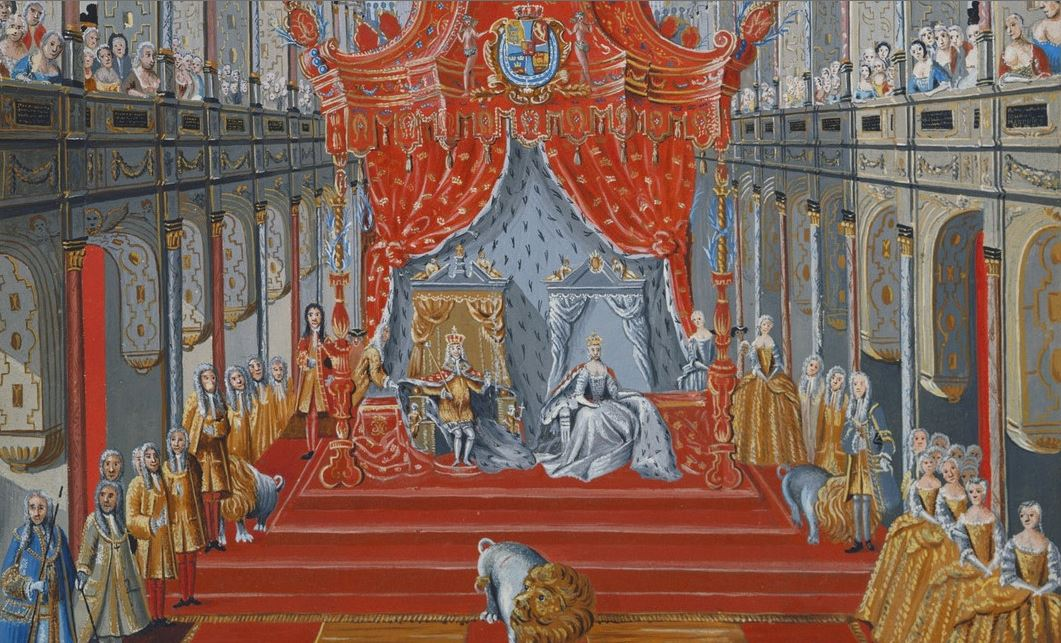
Nobles at the 1731 coronation of King Christian VI.

A minor but nevertheless considerable element of the modern aristocracy was the office nobility (Norwegian: embetsadel or embedsadel, also called rangadel). It was introduced in 1679 and would, with extensive reductions during the 18th century, last until 1814.

A person holding a high-ranking office within one of the highest classes of rank automatically received ennoblement for himself, for his wife, and for his legitimate children, and for decades this status was normally hereditable for his patrilineal and legitimate descendants. However, basically all such ennoblements were annulled when King Christian VI, tired of his father's generosity, acceded to the throne in 1730, and only those who received a special recognition after making an application retained their noble status. The office nobility as such was not abolished. Subsequent royal decrees introduced a more restrictive policy, under which noble status dependent on offices was limited to the person concerned, to his wife, and to his legitimate children. The Decree on the Order of Precedence of 1671 was radical, for the first time deciding that the nobility did not automatically have the highest rank in the kingdom. It stated explicitly that the nobility should enjoy their traditional rank above other estates and subjects unless the latter were specified in the order of precedence. In other words, any person within the rank stood above noble persons outside this. The Noble Privileges of 1661 had stated the opposite, namely that the nobility should enjoy rank and honour above all others.

Finally, the Letter of Privileges of 11 February 1679 introduced automatical noble status for the highest members of the order of precedence. As such the office nobility had been established. The letter stated explicitly that these persons of rank as well as wife and children should enjoy all privileges and benefits that others of the nobility had in the present and in the future, and it was also stressed that they should be honoured, respected, and regarded equally with nobles of birth.

The office nobility has later been considered with lesser regard, and for example the Yearbook of the Danish Nobility does not include such persons and families.

Examples:

- Mathias de Tonsberg, who was automatically ennobled in 1704 when he became Councillor of the State (Norwegian: etatsråd).
- Hans Eilersen Hagerup, who was automatically ennobled in 1761 when he became General Commissioner of War. (In 1781 he was even ennobled by letter.)

=== Letter nobility ===
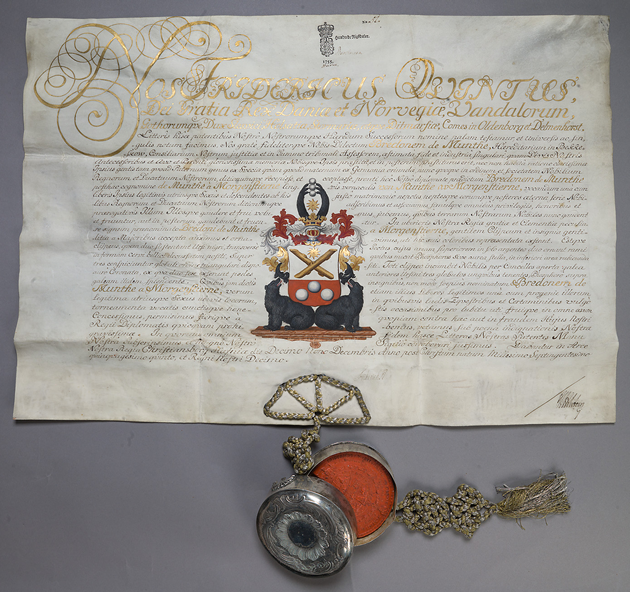
Letter of nobility of the Munthe af Morgenstierne family.

Beginning already in the High Medieval Age but especially associated with the late 17th century and the 18th century, it became customary to ennoble persons by letters patent (Norwegian: adelsbrev) for significant military or artistic achievements, and there were also persons who were ennobled in this way after making monetary donations. These are informally known as letter nobility (Norwegian: brevadel).

Other families are Rosenvinge and Tordenstjerne, both ennobled in 1505. However, the custom of ennobling by letters patent increased drastically in the late 17th century and the 18th century, when numerous persons and families received such noble status. They were a part of the king's plan of creating a new and loyal nobility replacing the old, who until 1660 had been political enemies of the king. However, letters patent given (unofficially: sold) among others to rich merchants were also a lucrative source of income for the kings, whose many wars at times led to a great need for money.

Examples:

- Kurt Sørensen was for bravery in battle ennobled under the name Adeler.
- Ludvig Holberg, a famous writer, was ennobled as a baron for his merits and by bequeathing his fortune to the Sorø Academy.
- Joachim Geelmuyden, the son of a priest and the grandson of a tradesman, held many titles and offices in the Dano-Norwegian state and was subsequently ennobled under the name Gyldenkrantz.

=== Feudal nobility ===
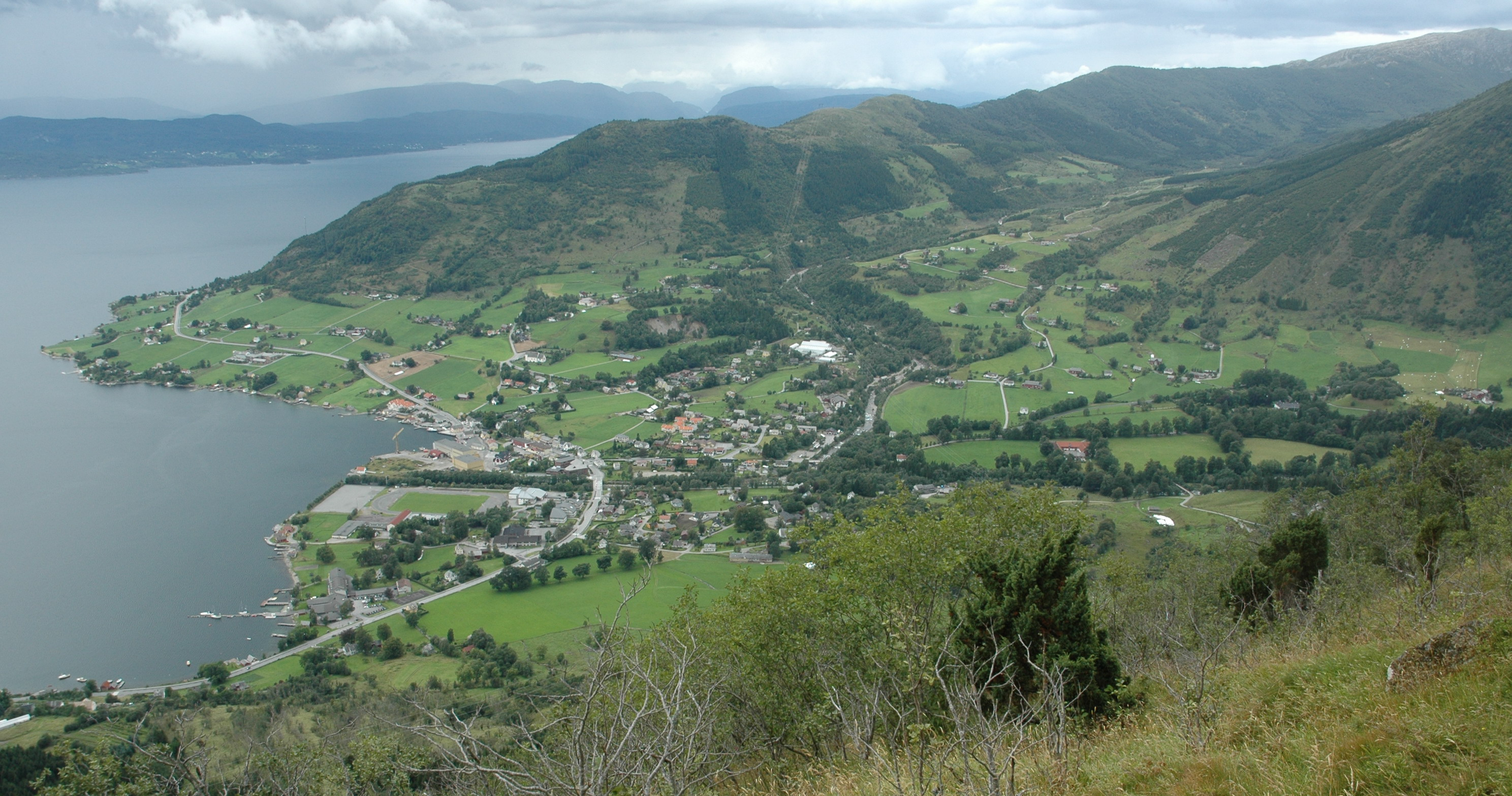
Rosendal, originally a feudal barony. Photographer: Nynorsk Wikipedia user Ekko

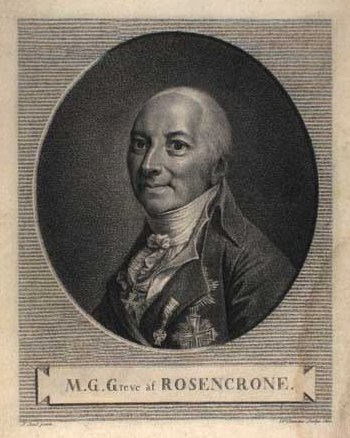
Norwegian-born Marcus Gerhard af Rosencrone (1738–1811), Count of Rosencrone; Prime Minister of the Dano-Norwegian Gehejme Government.

With feudal barons and feudal counts one saw the introduction of a neo-feudal structure in Norway. These modern fiefs were ruled with conditioned independence by noble families, and they were hereditable. Feudal lords were equipped with extensive rights and duties. On the other hand, a fief was formally a dominium directum of the king. It would as such return to the Crown when a title became extinct (see for example Barony of Rosendal) or when a feudal lord was sentenced for disloyalty (see for example Countship of Griffenfeld).

The main architect behind the new system of barons and counts, introduced in 1671, was Peder Schumacher, who himself was ennobled as Peder Schumacher Griffenfeld in 1671 and created Count of Griffenfeld in 1673. In 1675 the citizens of Tønsberg lost their independence, and the city was merged into the Countship. Griffenfeld had been granted the sole right to all mining and hunting within the Countship. He could appoint judges, arrest and charge inhabitants, and punish sentenced criminals. He could appoint priests to all churches, which he owned. Several duties were imposed on the Count's subjects. For example, cotters (Norwegian: husmann) under the Count had to work for him without payment.

Whilst these new politics could bring fundamental changes to each area concerned, the effect and the consequences remained limited in Norway in general, as originally only two countships and one barony were created. These included only a small amount of the Norwegian population. Divided into counties (Norwegian: amt), the rest of Norway was under direct royal administration.

=== Huguenot immigration ===
Lutheran Evangelical kingdoms, Denmark and Norway welcomed Huguenots who had escaped from France following the 1685 revocation of the Edict of Nantes. Huguenots were greeted with several privileges, and some even achieved noble status and/or titles. One was Jean Henri Huguetan (1665–1749) from Lyon, who was created Count of Gyldensteen in 1717.

=== Increasing influence of Norwegians ===
During the 18th century, Norwegian-born noblemen and burghers rose to prominence within the Dano-Norwegian state.

=== Introduction of the stavnsbånd ===
In 1733 King Christian VI introduced the system of stavnsbånd—a serfdom-like institution—in Denmark. This was introduced following an agricultural crisis that lead people to leave the countryside and move into towns. The system would last until after 1788.

The stavnsbånd was not introduced in Norway, where all men had been free since the Old Norse heathen trelldom was fought and abolished by the Roman Catholic Church.

=== Years of Struensee ===
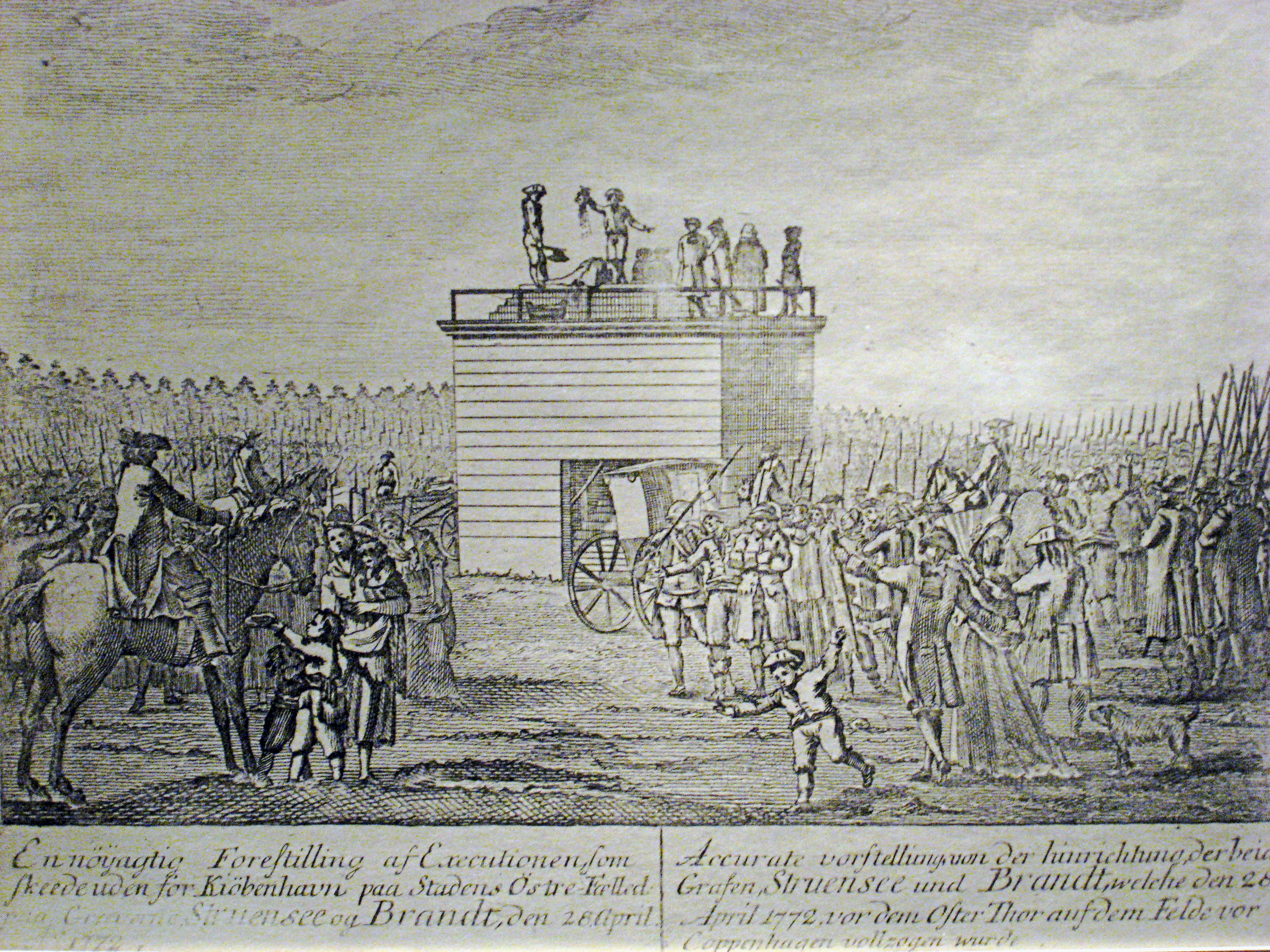
Execution of ex-count Struensee. Artist: unknown

During the de facto reign of Johann Friedrich Struensee between 1770 and 1772 the power of the nobility in Denmark and Norway was challenged. Whilst he did not mind creating himself and his friend Brandt feudal counts, Struensee was an enemy of the hereditary aristocracy, which he sought to replace with a merit-based system of government. A part of his reforms Struensee abolished noble privileges and decided that state employments should be based on a person's qualifications only.

In a counter-coup on 17 January 1772 Ove Høegh-Guldberg, Hans Henrik von Eickstedt, Georg Ludwig von Köller-Banner and others had Struensee arrested. In a following trial he was sentenced to death. On 28 April ex-counts Brandt and Struensee were executed; first their right hands were cut off, whereafter they were beheaded and had their bodies drawn and quartered.

=== 1814 Constitution and 1821 Nobility Law ===
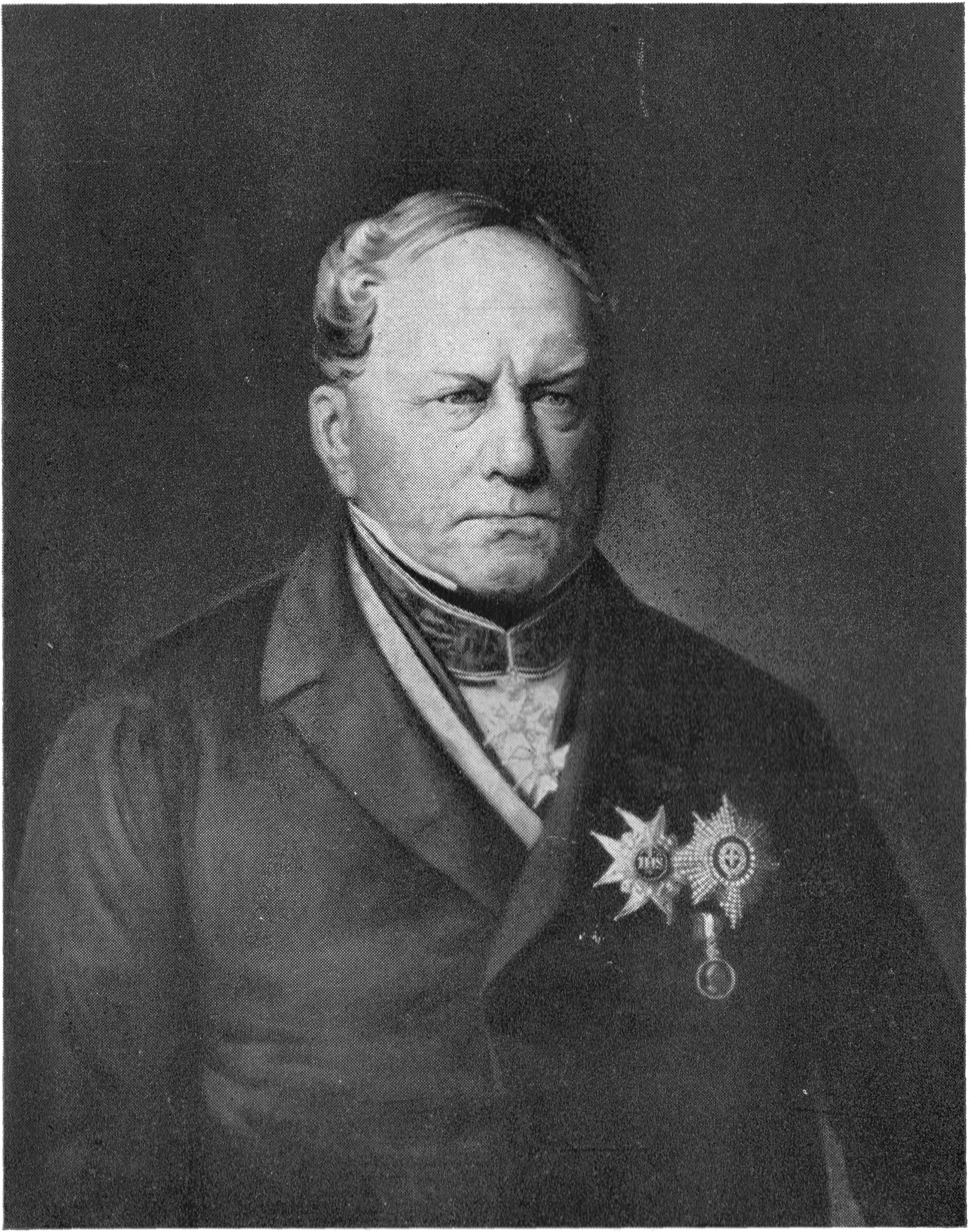
Severin Løvenskiold.

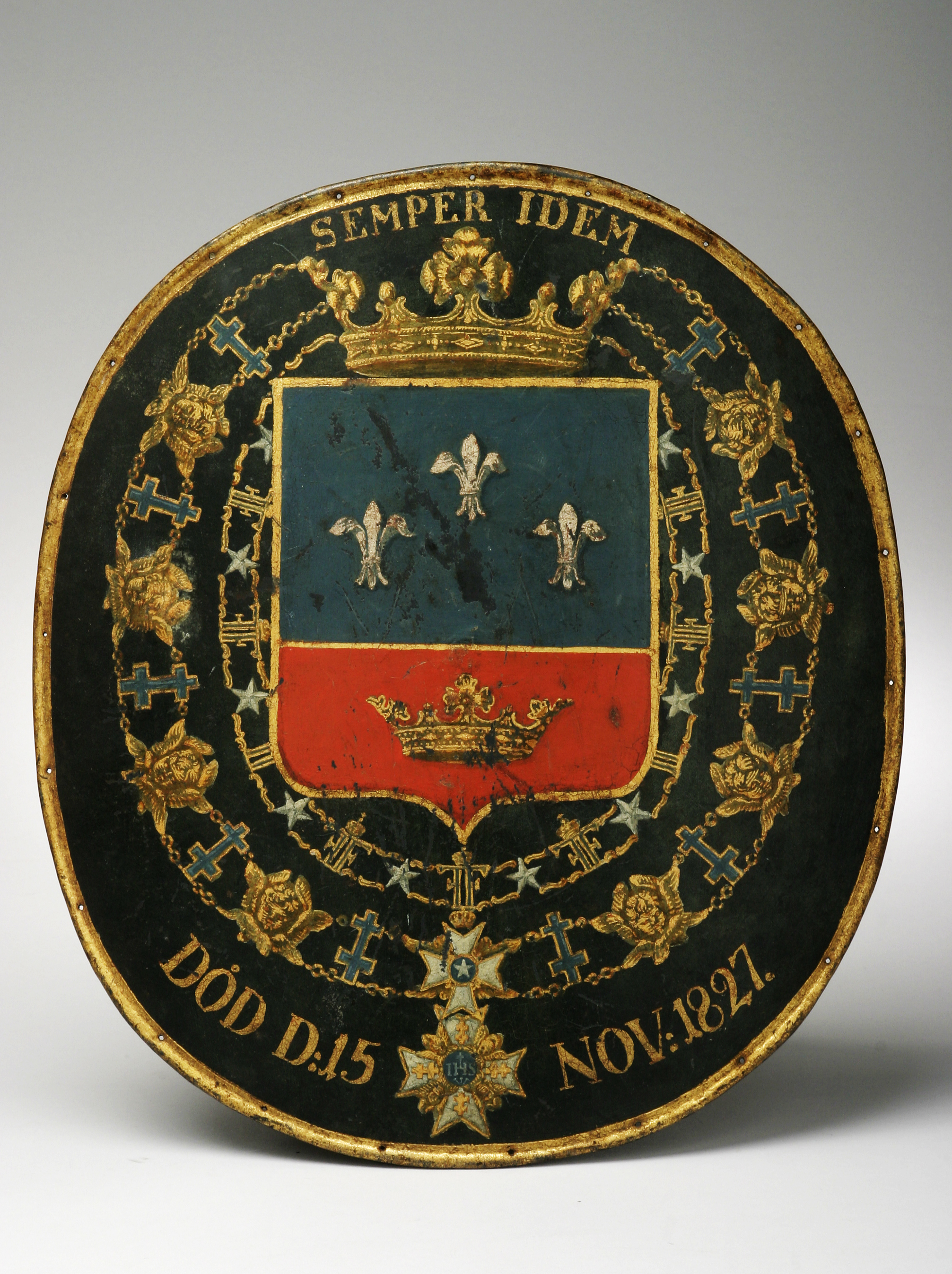
Seraphim plate of Prime Minister Mathias Sommerhielm.

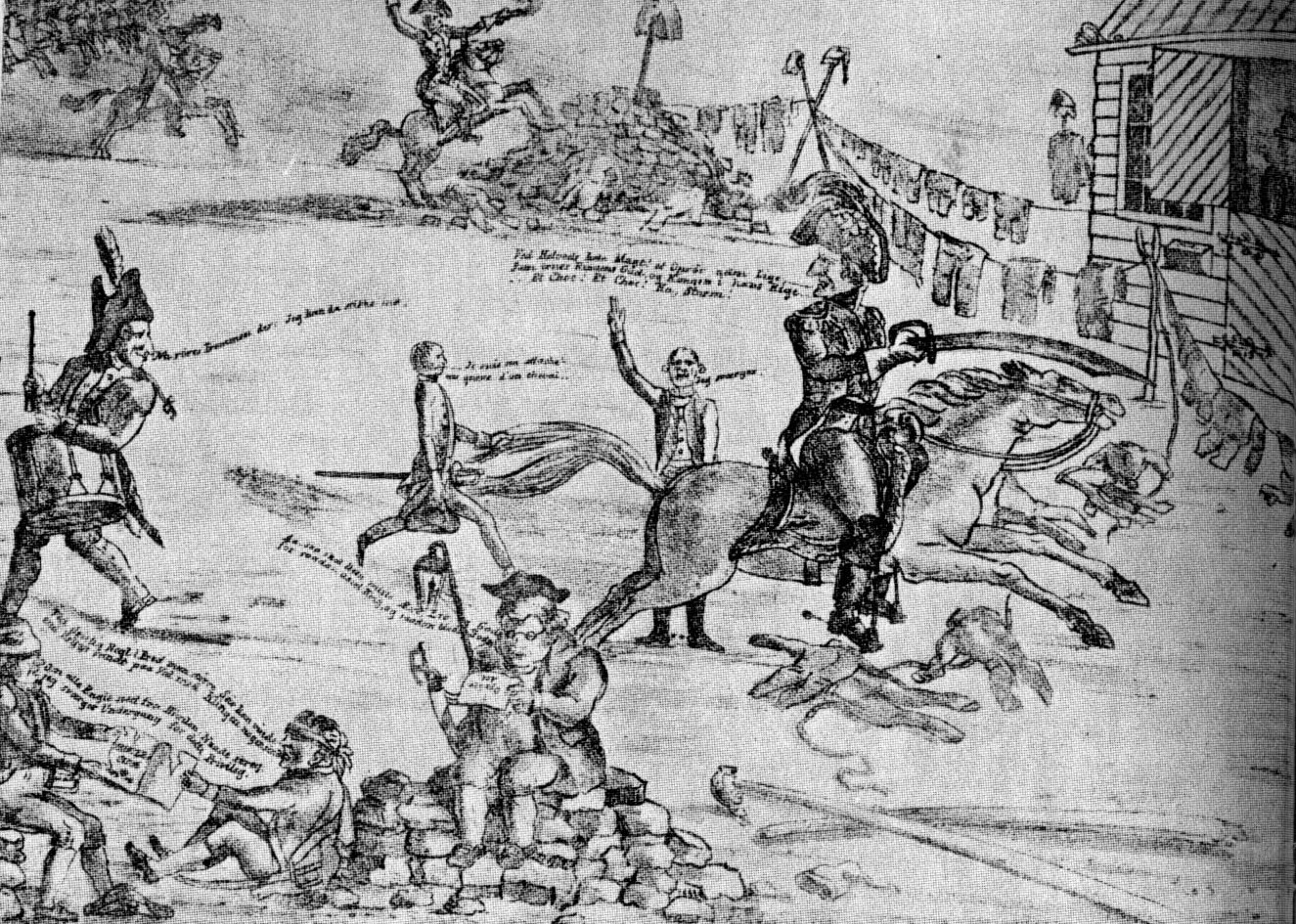
Satirical cartoon depicting 'Skipper Børre' (the Count of Platen) and 'Uedel Skarnsberg' i.e. 'Ignoble Dirtberg' (Baron Ferdinand Carl Maria Wedel-Jarlsberg) in the 1829 Battle of the Square.

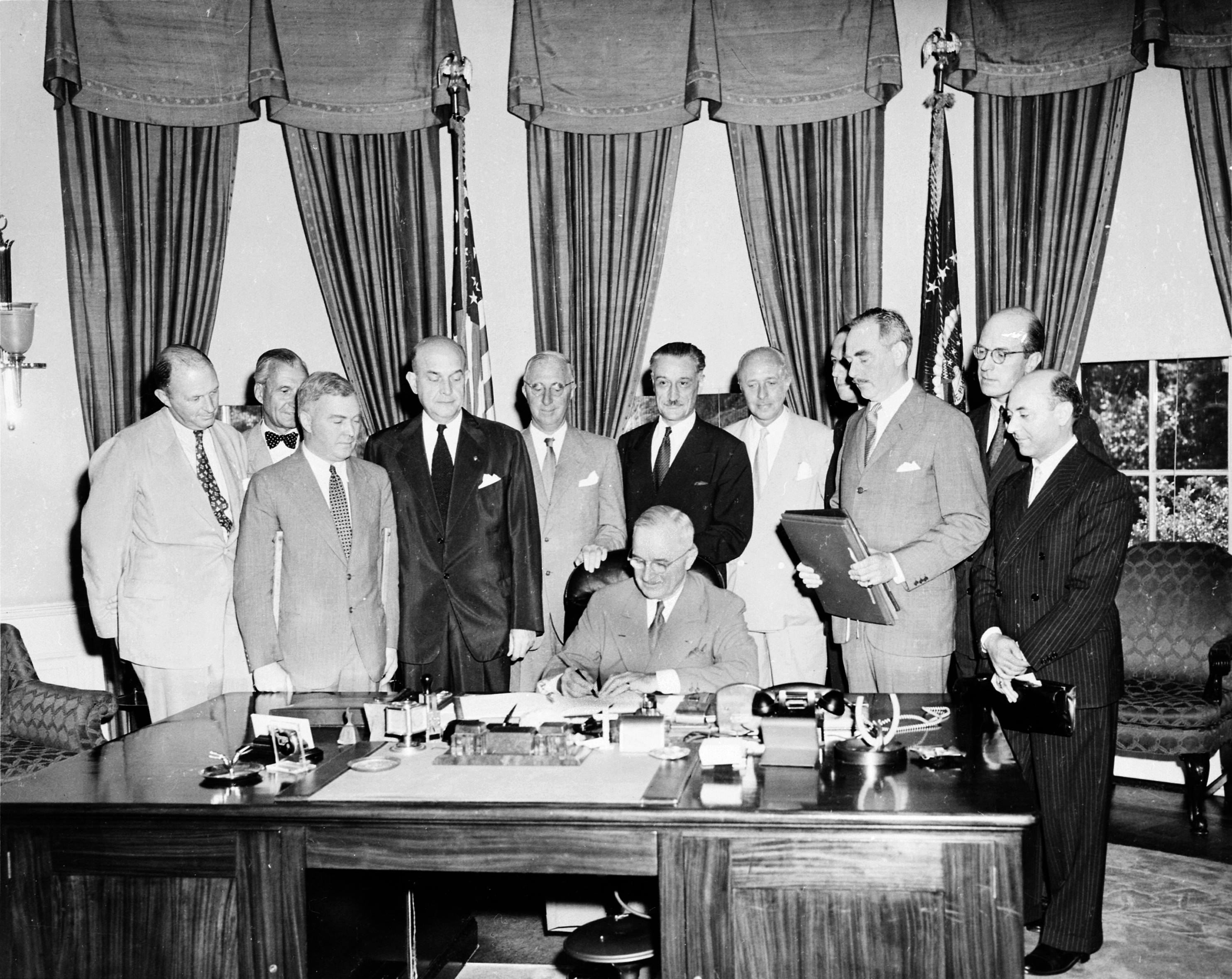
Ambassador Wilhelm Morgenstierne representing Norway when US President Truman signed the North Atlantic Treaty in 1949.

The Constitution of the Kingdom of Norway of 1814, which had been established in the spirit of the principles of the French Revolution and greatly influenced by the Constitution of the United States of America, forbade the creation of new nobility, including countships, baronies, family estates (Norwegian: stamhus), and fee tails (Norwegian: fideikommiss). Beside being in accordance with the contemporary political ideology, the prohibition effectively removed the possibility for Norway's king, who after 1814 also was Sweden's king, to create a nobility of Swedes and loyal Norwegians.

The Nobility Law of 1821 (Norwegian: Adelsloven) initiated a long-range abolition of all noble titles and privileges, while the current nobility were allowed to keep their noble status, possible titles and in some cases also privileges for the rest of their lifetime. Under the Nobility Law, nobles who for themselves and their children wished to present a claim to nobility before the Norwegian parliament were required to provide documentation confirming their noble status. Representatives of eighteen noble families submitted their claims to the Parliament.

In 1815 and in 1818, the Parliament had passed the same law, and it was vetoed both times by the king. The king did not possess a third veto, so he had to approve the law in 1821. Shortly afterwards, the king suggested the creation of a new nobility, but the attempt was rejected by the Parliament.

Many of the Norwegians who had noble status in Norway had noble status also in Denmark and thus remained noble. This and the fact that many Norwegian nobles did not live in the country may have contributed to reduced resistance to the Nobility Law. However, there was resistance, which found its most significant expression in Severin Løvenskiold, who had fought against democracy and who had worked to stop the Nobility Law. As an important politician and major political ally of the king, Løvenskiold was not without power. Løvenskiold argued against the law that Norway's king, and thus the kingdom's government, had granted his family eternal noble status, and the letters patent of 1739 uses the expression ‘eternally’. At the same time, the Constitution's § 97 in fact stated: ‘No law must be given retroactive force.’

The last Norwegian count with official recognition was Peder Anker, Count of Wedel-Jarlsberg, who died in 1893. His younger brothers were Herman, Baron of Wedel-Jarlsberg, who died in 1888, and Harald, Baron of Wedel-Jarlsberg, who died in 1897. The cousins Ulriche Antoinette de Schouboe (1813–1901) and Julie Elise de Schouboe (1813–1911), as well as Anne Sophie Dorothea Knagenhjelm (1821–1907), died early in the 20th century as some of Norway's last persons who had had official recognition as noble.

Although the institution of nobility gradually was dissolved, members of noble families continued to play a significant rôle in the political and social life of the country. For example, Stewards and Prime Ministers such as Count Herman Wedel-Jarlsberg (Steward, 1836–1840), Severin Løvenskiold (Steward, 1841–1856, Prime Minister, 1828–1841), Peder Anker (Prime Minister, 1814–1822), Frederik Due (Prime Minister, 1841–1858), Georg Sibbern (Prime Minister, 1858–1871) and Carl Otto Løvenskiold (Prime Minister, 1884) had aristocratic backgrounds.

=== 1905 Independence ===
Aristocrats were active also in the dissolution of the union between Norway and Sweden in 1905. Most prominent were diplomat Fritz Wedel Jarlsberg and world-famous polar explorer Fridtjof Wedel-Jarlsberg Nansen. Nansen, who otherwise became Norway's first ambassador to London (1906–08), was pro dissolving the union and, among other acts, travelled to the United Kingdom, where he successfully lobbied for support for the independence movement. Also in the ensuing referendum concerning monarchy versus republic in Norway, the popular hero Nansen's support of monarchy and his active participation in the pro-monarchy campaign is said to have had an important effect on popular opinion. After the dissolution of the union, the leading person in the creation of the new state's Ministry of Foreign Affairs was Thor von Ditten, a Norwegian of foreign nobility.

=== Present state ===
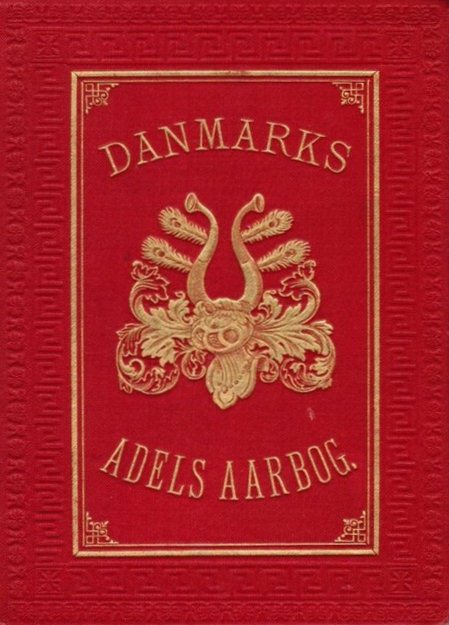
Many noble Norwegians are noble also in Denmark and as such included in the Yearbook of the Danish Nobility.

Today, the nobility is a relatively marginal factor in the society, culturally and socially as well as in politics. Members of noble families are only individually prominent, like Anniken Huitfeldt. However, a handful of families, especially Løvenskiold, Treschow, and Wedel-Jarlsberg, still possess considerable wealth. This includes fame and regular appearance in newspapers and also coloured magazines.

Landowner and businessman Carl Otto Løvenskiold owns Maxbo among other companies. The brothers Nicolai and Peder Løvenskiold own a large number of higher private schools in Norway, among others the Westerdals School of Communication, the Bjørknes College, and the Norwegian School of Information Technology. Prominent was also the now late landowner and businesswoman Mille-Marie Treschow, who was one of the wealthiest women in Norway.

Until and during the 20th century, noble persons have served at the Royal Court in Oslo. Prominent are (since 1985) Mistress of the Robes Ingegjerd Løvenskiold Stuart and (between 1931 and 1945) Lord Chamberlain Peder Anker Wedel-Jarlsberg.

Although privileges were abolished and official recognition of titles was removed, some families still consider themselves noble by tradition and—lawfully—still bear their inherited name and coat of arms. Claims to nobility have no effect or support in law. There are still Norwegians who enjoy official recognition from the Danish government;—the nobility in Denmark still exists. They are likewise included in the Yearbook of the Danish Nobility, published by the Association of the Danish Nobility.

The family Roos af Hjelmsäter of the Swedish nobility is among the disappearingly few of Norway's medieval noble families still living today.

== Noble influence and legacy ==
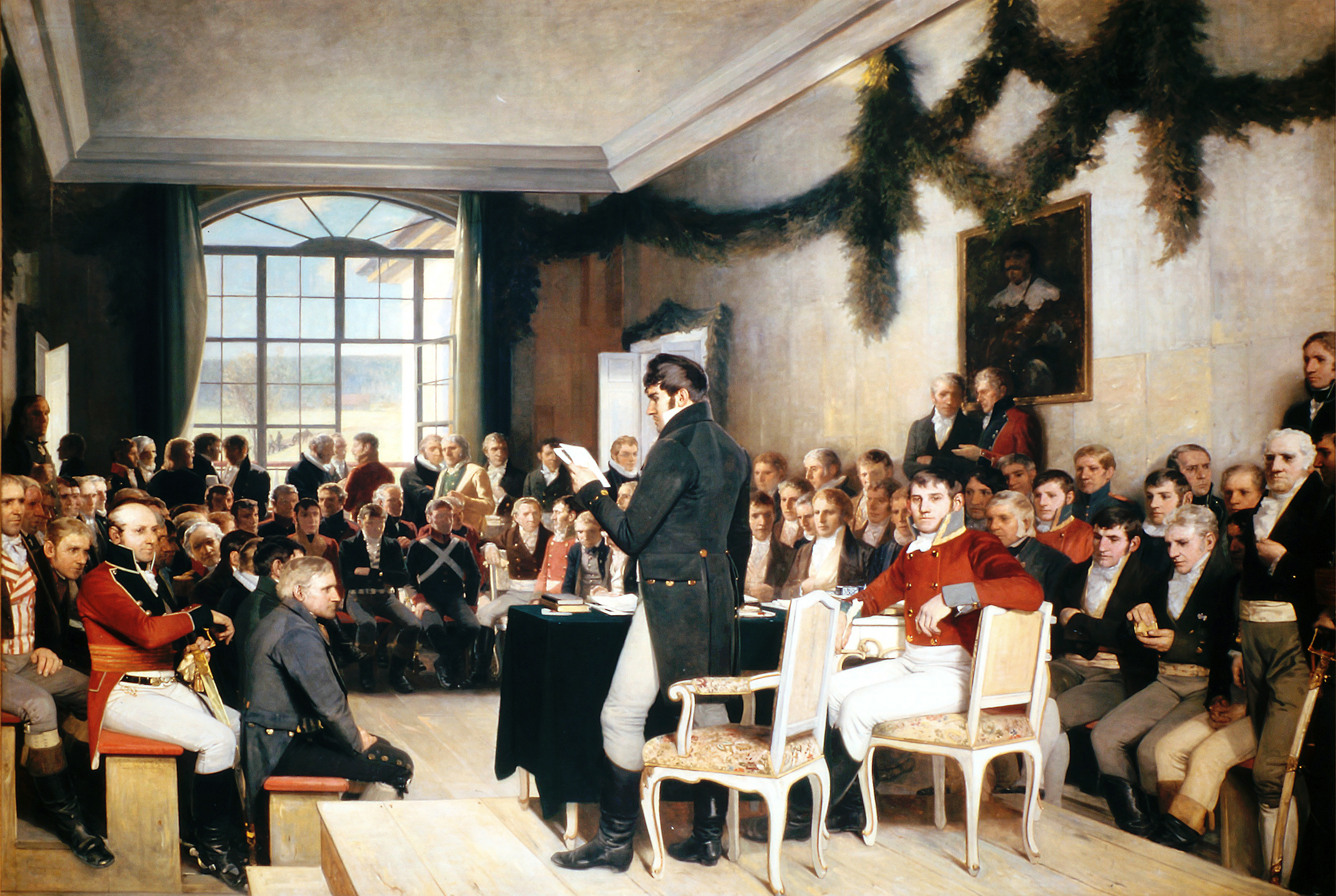
Christian Magnus Falsen (standing), ‘Father of the Constitution’. Painter: Oscar Wergeland

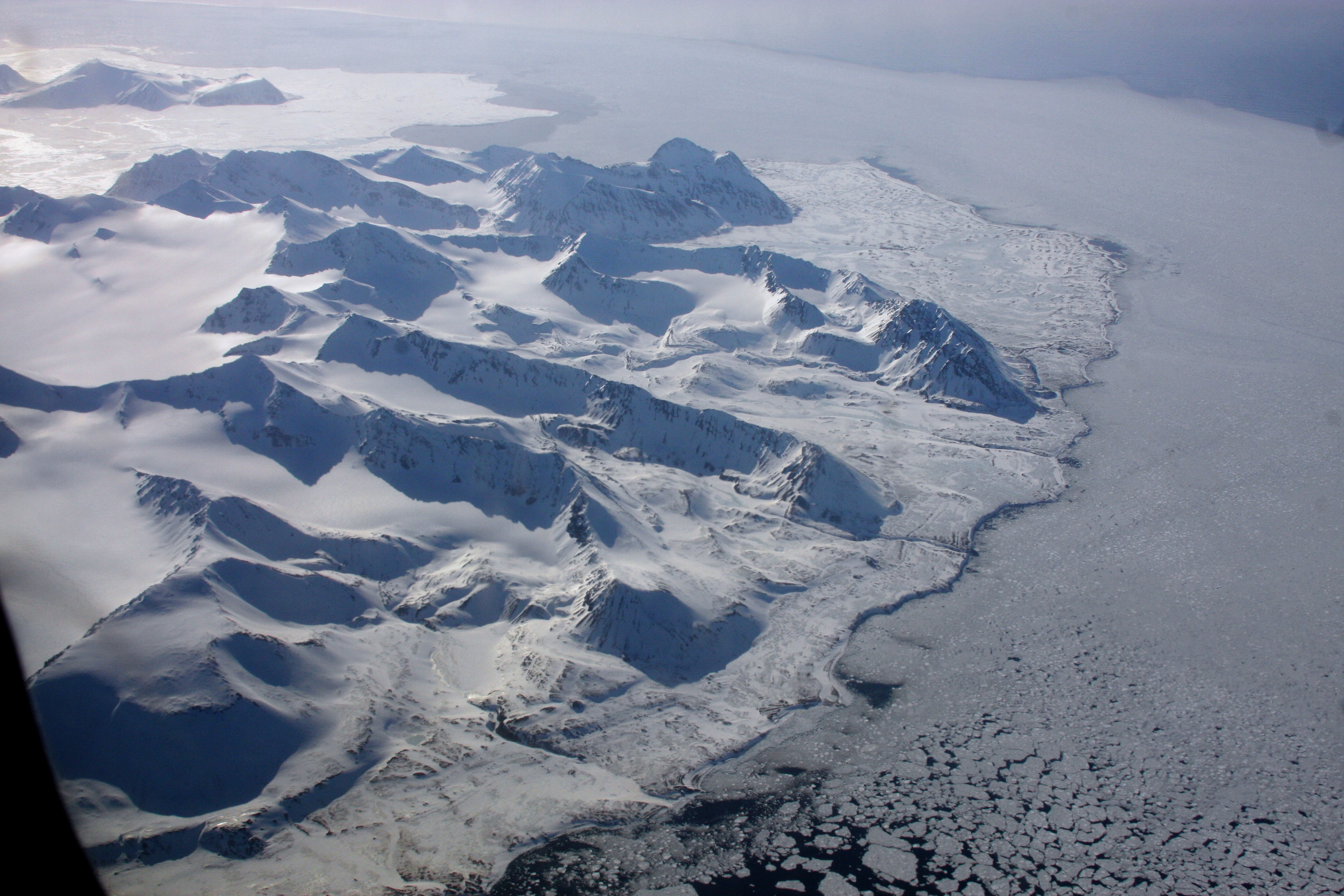
Wedel Jarlsberg Land on Svalbard is named after Fritz Wedel Jarlsberg, whose efforts contributed to Norway gaining sovereignty of this arctic archipelago in 1920. Photographer: Commons user Bjoertvedt

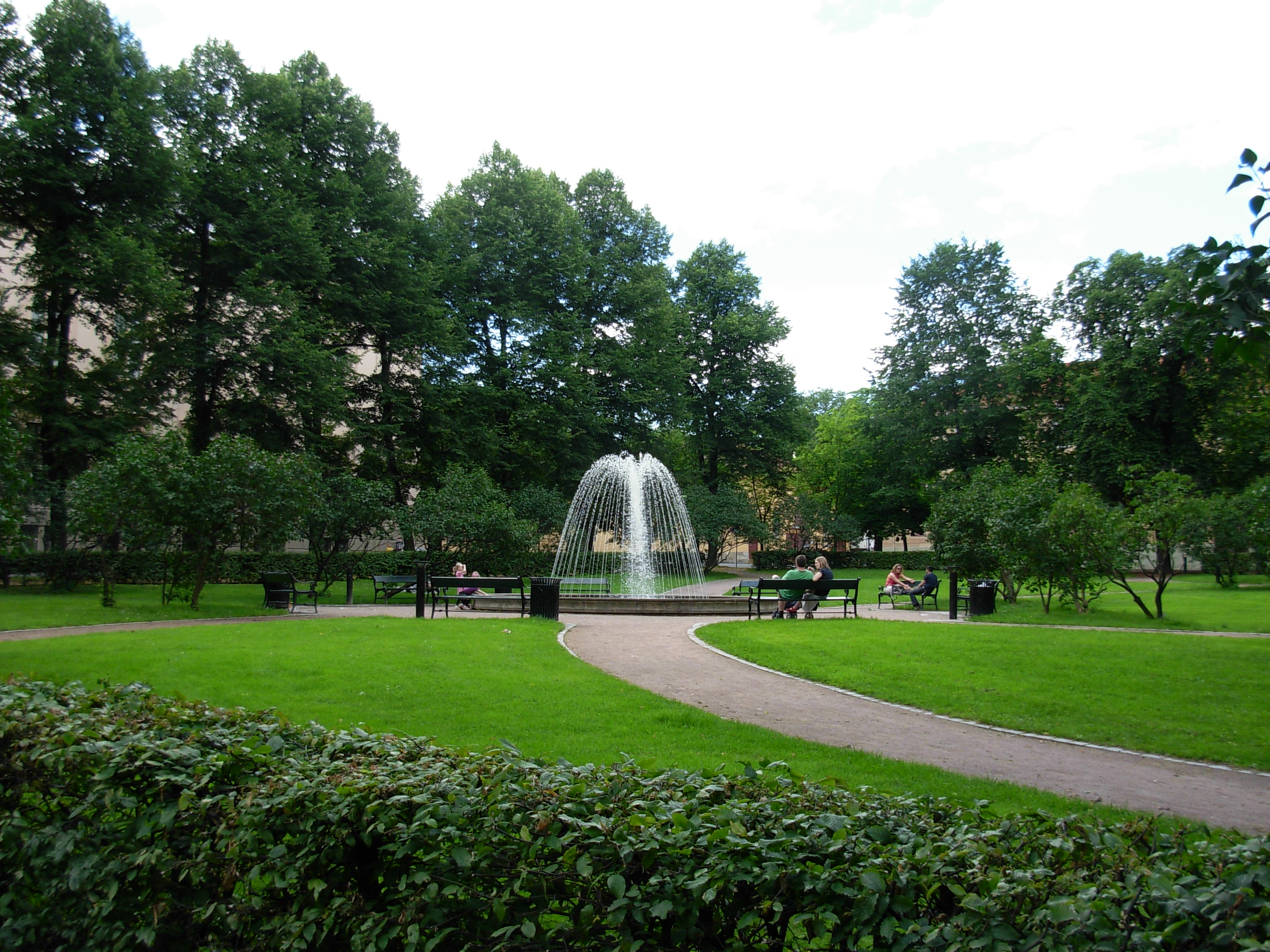
Count Wedel Square in Oslo. Photographer: Helge Høifødt

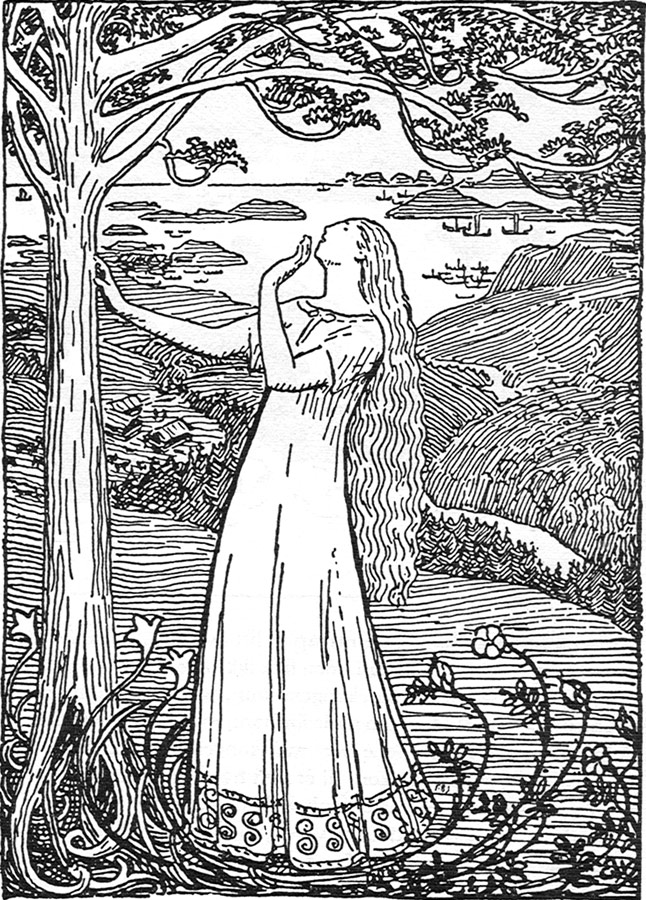
Erik Werenskiold's illustrations of the sagas are known to all Norwegians. This drawing is based on Queen Ragnhild's Dream.

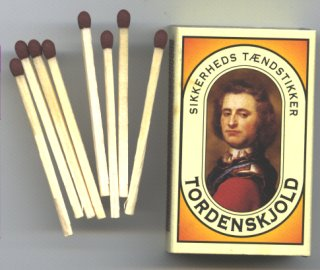
A Danish box of firesticks depicting popular hero Tordenskiold.

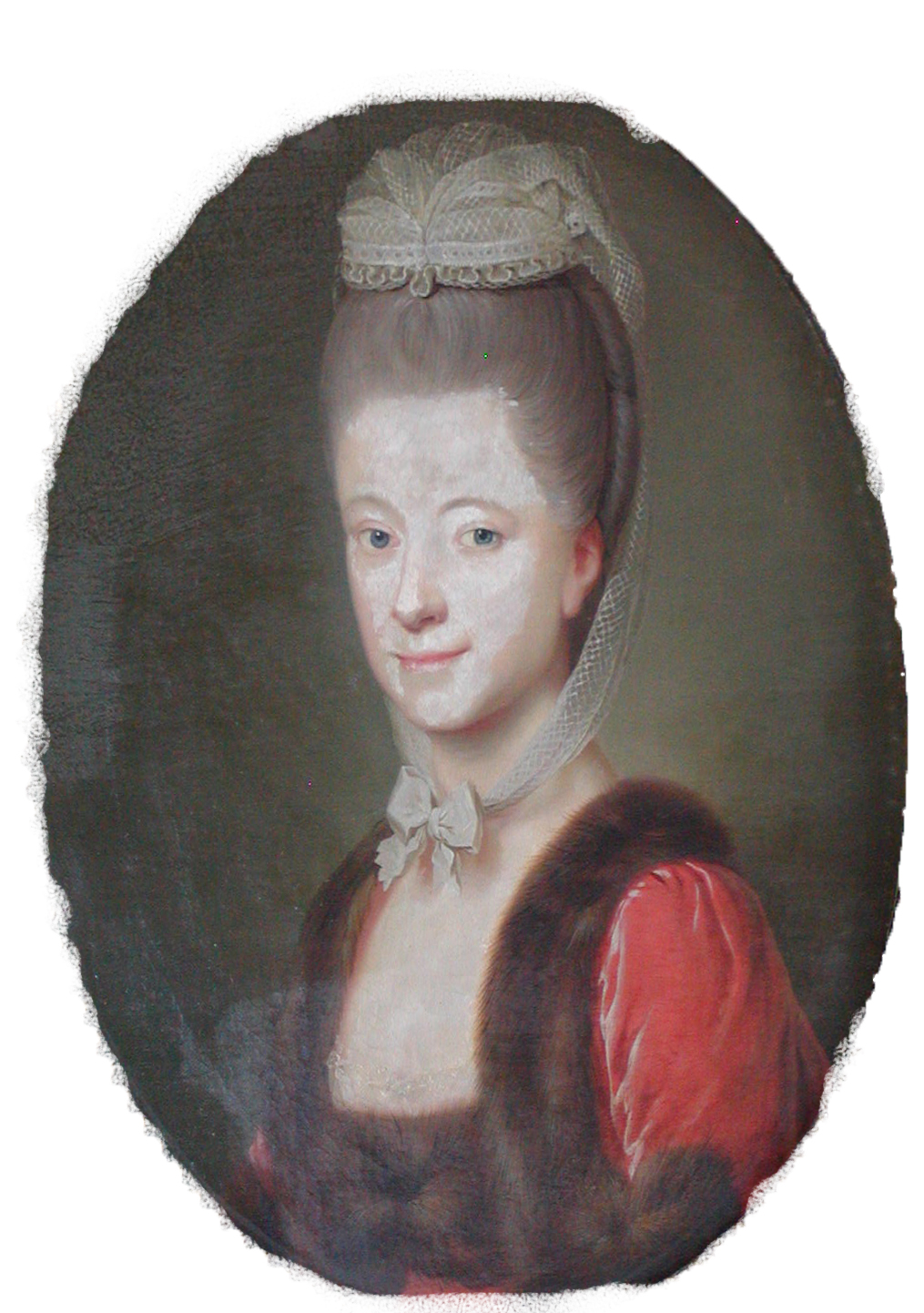
Agnete Marie, Countess of Rosencrone, née Hielmstierne. After the Dano-Norwegian union ended in 1814, the Comital Foundation of Hielmstierne-Rosencrone was divided into one Danish and one Norwegian.

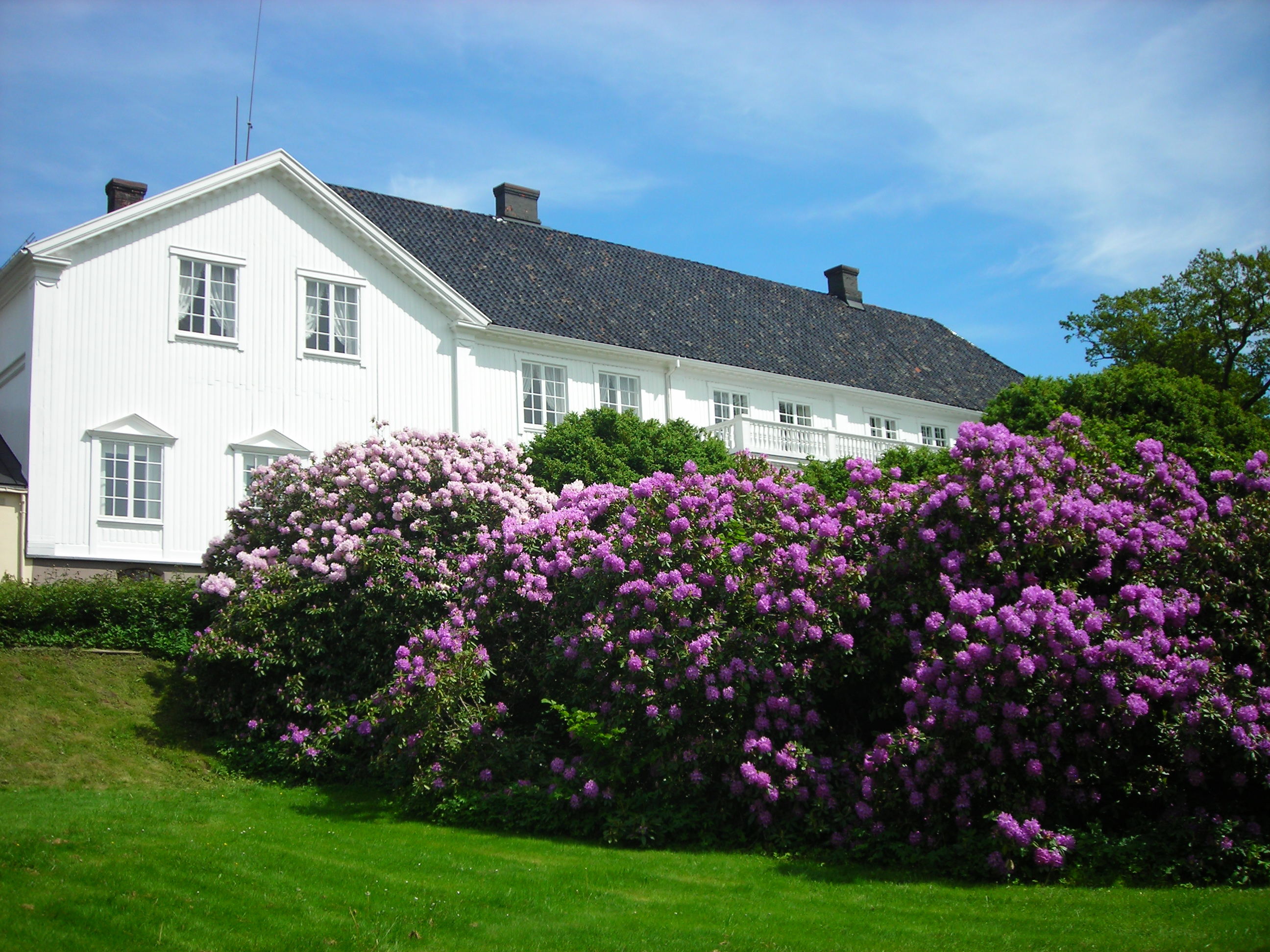
The interior of the Rød Manor is owned by the foundation The Anker Collections.

The aristocracy has ruled and shaped Norway throughout nearly the entire existence of the kingdom. Products of and references to the aristocracy are both visible and less explicit in today's society.

=== Major cases ===
In 1814 noblemen were leading when a constitutional monarchy and a parliament were established in Norway. Among them were the Count of Wedel-Jarlsberg, Peder Anker, and Christian Magnus Falsen. The Constitution of the Kingdom of Norway of 1814, which is still in function, was written by a nobleman, namely by Falsen. This constitution grants, among other things, freedom of speech, protection of private property, and prohibition of painful search and seizure.

In 1905 members of the aristocracy were leading in the independence movement. Eystein Eggen has claimed Norway's independence was realised by a 'genuinely aristocratic wave', in which especially Fridtjof Wedel-Jarlsberg Nansen and Fritz Wedel-Jarlsberg were important persons.

=== References ===
In culture

- Christian Magnus Falsen was depicted on the 1,000 kroner bank-note between 1979 and 2001.
- Peter Wessel Tordenskiold was together with non-noble Wilhelm Frimann Koren Christie depicted on the 1,000 kroner bank-note, the 100 kroner bank-note, and the 10 kroner bank-note between 1901 and 1945.
- The idiom Tordenskiold's soldiers (Norwegian: Tordenskiolds soldater) is related to aforementioned Tordenskiold.
- Lady Inger of Ostrat is a famous romantic nationalist play published by Henrik Ibsen in 1857. It refers to Lady Ingerd Ottesdotter Rømer to Austrått. Based on the play a movie was made in 1975 by Sverre Udnæs.
- Some official coats of arms display or are inspired by noble coats of arms, including Coat of arms of Sarpsborg (see Alv Erlingsson) and Coat of arms of Våler, Østfold (see Bolt), and the Coat of arms of Troms (see Bjarkøy dynasty). The Coat of arms of Lillehammer displays a Birchleg. KNM Tordenskjold, the Royal Norwegian Navy's school for maritime warfare, uses aforementioned Tordenskiold's arms.
- The Werenskiold family have produced two prominent artists, namely Erik Werenskiold (1855–1938), who especially is known for his illustrations of Norse sagas, and his son Dagfin Werenskiold (1892–1977), a sculptor and a painter.

In names and places

- Several streets, squares and so on are named after noblemen, among others Grev Wedels plass (Count Wedel Square), Løvenskiolds gate (Løvenskiold Street), Majorstua (a part of Oslo), and Wedel Jarlsberg Land.
- Several buildings, enterprises and so on are named after noblemen, among others Best Western Gyldenløve Hotell (a hotel), Marie Treschow (a private home for old people), and Georg Morgenstiernes Hus (a building at the University of Oslo campus).

Philanthropy Norwegian foundations origined along with settled estates (stamhus) and fee tails (fideikommiss) during absolutism in Norway, and noblemen were among the first to establish such. In 1814, when the Constitution of the Kingdom of Norway was introduced, the foundation system was the only to survive; the creation of new settled estates and new fee tails was prohibited.

Of over 7,000 foundations in Norway today, several have been established by or bear the name of noble persons and families. An example is the Comital Foundation of Hielmstierne-Rosencrone, providing financial support to certain poor women in Bergen. Others are:

- Det Ankerske Broderbørns og Descendenters Midler (Anker family)
- Stiftelsen Det Ankerske Waisenhus (Anker family)
- Eva og Erik Ankers Legat (Anker family)
- Johan Ankers Fond (Anker family)
- Stiftelsen De Ankerske Samlinger (Anker family)
- Assessor L.W. Knagenhjelm og Fru Selma f. Rolls Legat (Knagenhjelm family)
- Otto Løvenskiolds Legat (Løvenskiold family)
- Statsminister Carl Løvenskiold og Frues Legat (Løvenskiold family)
- Legatet til Otto Løvenskiolds Minde (Løvenskiold family)
- Professor Morgenstiernes Fond (Munthe af Morgenstierne family, B.H. von M. af M.)
- Den Grevelige Hielmstierne Rosencroneske Stiftelse (Count and Countess of Rosencrone)
- Den Grevelige Hjelmstjerne-Rosencroneske Stiftelse ved Universitetet i Oslo (Count and Countess of Rosencrone)
- Den Grevelige Hjelmstjerne-Rosencroneske Stiftelse til Universitetsbiblioteket i Oslo (Count and Countess of Rosencrone)
- Den Grevelige Hielmstierne Rosencroneske Stiftelses Legat v/Det Kgl. Norske Videnskabers Selskabs Stiftelse (Count and Countess of Rosencrone)
- Stiftelsen Skoleskibet Tordenskiold (P.W. Tordenskiold)
- Trampes Legat (Countess of Trampe)
- Fritz Gerhard Treschows Minnefond (Treschow family)
- Willum Frederik Treschows Handelhøyskolefond (Treschow family)
- Wedel-Jarlsbergsfond (Counts of Jarlsberg)
- Familien Wedel Jarlsbergs Stiftelse til Fordel for Jarlsberg Hovedgårds Pensjonister (Counts of Jarlsberg)
- Frk Harriet Wedel-Jarlsbergs Pensjonsfond for Bærums Verk (Counts of Jarlsberg)
- Gustav og Maria Smith og Hermann Wedel-Jarlsbergs Legat (Counts of Jarlsberg)
- Jarlsberg Hovedgårds Gravstedlegat (Counts of Jarlsberg)

Wollstonecraft In her work Letters Written in Sweden, Norway, and Denmark, published in 1796, Mary Wollstonecraft shares her impressions of Norway. Some descriptions are related to the nobility and to the social structure:

- 'Though the king of Denmark be an absolute monarch, yet the Norwegians appear to enjoy all the blessings of freedom. Norway may be termed a sister kingdom; but the people have no viceroy to lord it over them, [...]' Letter VII.
- '[...] the Norwegians appear to me to be the most free community I have ever observed.' Letter VII.
- 'There are only two counts in the whole country who have estates, and exact some feudal observances from their tenantry.' Letter VII.
- 'In short, I have seldom heard of any noblemen so innoxious.' Letter IX.
- '[In Christiania, i.e. Oslo,] I saw the cloven foot of despotism. I boasted to you that they had no viceroy in Norway, but these Grand Bailiffs, particularly the superior one, who resides at Christiania, are political monsters of the same species. [...] The Grand Bailiffs are mostly noblemen from Copenhagen, [...]' Letter XIII.
- 'The aristocracy in Norway, if we keep clear of Christiania, is far from being formidable; and it will require a long the to enable the merchants to attain a sufficient moneyed interest to induce them to reinforce the upper class at the expense of the yeomanry, with whom they are usually connected.' Letter XIV.

== Noble families ==
=== Ancient aristocratic families ===
The following list contains families who appeared before, during, and after the so-called unification of Norway (c. 872–1050). To these belonged also the post-unification lendman aristocracy (1050–1184/1240).

Name	Appearance	Extinction	Information	Ref.
Arnmødling Dynasty	10th century		Appears with Earl Arnmod, who died in the Battle of Hjörungavágr.	
Bjarkøy Dynasty, the older line	10th century		Appears with Þórir hundr Þórirsson.	
Bjarkøy Dynasty, the younger line		1355	Established with Jon Arnason of the Arnmødlings, who married Þórir hundr's granddaughter Rannveig Þórirsdóttir.	
Giske Dynasty	11th century	1265	Established with Torberg Arnason of the Arnmødlings.	
Rein Dynasty	1066-1067		Appears with Skule Kongsfostre, stepson of the Earl of Northumbria.	
Torgar Dynasty a.k.a. the House of William	1066-1067		Appears with Kjetil Krok, son of the Earl of Northumbria, likewise Skule Kongsfostre's maternal half-brother.	
Sudreim Dynasty	12th century	Alive.	Appears with Lendman Åle varg Ivarsson. Still alive as the Roos af Hjelmsäter family.	
Tornberg Dynasty	12th century	1290		

==== Dukes ====
C.o.a.	Name of receiver	Sexus	House	Existed	Ref.
	Skule Bårdsson	M	Gille	1237-1240	
	Haakon V Magnusson	M	Sverre	1270-1299	

==== Earldomes ====
C.o.a.	Name of fief	Name of receiver	Sexus	House	Existed	Ref.
	Earldome of Iceland	Gissur Þorvaldsson	M	Haukdælir clan	1258-1268	
	Earldome of Lade	Håkon Grjotgardsson	M	Håløyg	800s-ca.1029	
	Earldome of Møre	Rognvald Eysteinsson	M	Møre		
	Earldome of Orkney	Einar Ragnvaldsson	M	Møre	Before 892-1468	
	Earldome of Sarpsborg	Alv Erlingsson	M	Tornberg	1286-1290	

==== Medieval feudal counts ====
C.o.a.	Name of fief	Name of receiver	Sexus	House	Existed	Ref.
	Fiefholder of Northern Halland	Duke Skule Bårdsson	M	House of Godwin	1228–1240	
	Count of Northern Halland	Jacob Nielsen, Count of Halland	M	House of Knýtlinga	1285-1305	
	Count of Northern Halland	Haakon V of Norway	M	House of Sverre	1305-	

==== Earls (Jarl) ====
C.o.a.	Name of receiver	Sexus	House	Title held	Ref.
	Vilhelm Henriksson Sinklar	M	Sinclair	1434-1470	
	Henrik Henriksson Sinklar	M	Sinclair	1404?-1470	
	Henrik Vilhelmsson Sinklar	M	Sinclair	1379-	
	Erengisle Sunesson	M	Bååt	1353-	
	Malise Malisesson	M	Strathearn	1331-	
	Magnus Jónsson	M	Angus	1303-1320	
	Archbishop Jørund	M		1297-1309	
	Alv Erlingsson	M	Tornberg	1285/86-1290	
	Jón Magnússon	M	Angus	1284-1303	
	Magnus Magnusson	M	Angus	1273-1284	
	Gissur Þorvaldsson	M	Haukdælir clan	1258-1268	
	Magnus Gilbertsson	M	Angus	1256-1273	
	Knut Håkonsson	M		1240-1261	
	Magnus II Gilbertsson	M	Angus	1236-1239	
	Skule Bårdsson	M	Gille	1217-1237	
	Jon Haraldsson	M	Møre	1206-1231	
	David Haraldsson	M	Møre	1206-1214	
	Filippus Simonsson	M		1204-1217	
	Håkon Folkvidsson the Crazy	M		1204-1214	
	Filip Birgersson	M	Bjälbo	-1200	
	Erling Skakke	M	Stødle	1163-1179	
	Sigurd Hallvardsson to Røyr	M		-1163	

==== Lendmann & barons ====
C.o.a.	Name of receiver	Sexus	House	Title held	Ref.
	Alv Erlingsson to Tornberg	M	Tornberg	Known 1286	DN XIX, nr. 317
	Andres Gregoriusson	M	Stårheim	Known 1273	DN I, nr. 64
	Andres Nikolasson to Dønnes	M	Kuvung	1266-1273	Sættargjerden
	Andres Plytt to Edøy	M		Known 1302	DN I, nr. 98
	Aslak Gus	M		Known 1273-74	Sættargjerden
	Audun Hugleiksson to Hegranes	M		Known 1277-1302	NS nr. 5
	Bjarne Audunsson			Known 1299	DN II, nr. 54
	Bjarne Erlingsson to Giske & Bjarkøy	M	Bjarkøy	Known 1287	DN V, nr. 21
	Bjarne Lodinsson	M		1304/5 - 1311	Sættargjerden
	Brynjolv Jonsson to Kvåle	M	Kvåle		DN II, nr. 54
	Eiliv of Naustdal	M	Naustdal	Known 1277	Sættargjerden
	Erling Alvsson to Tornberg	M	Tornberg	1261-1283	DN I, nr. 64
	Erling Amundsson	M		Known 1277	Sættargjerden
	Gaute Erlingsson to Talgje	M	Talgje	Known 1288	DN II, nr. 24
	Gaute Jonsson to Mel	M	Mel	Known 1277	Sættargjerden
	Gaute Gautesson the young, to Hatteberg	M	Galte	Known 1277	Sættargjerden
	Guttorm Gydasson	M		Known 1277-1306	
	Hallkjell Ogmundsson Krøkedans	M	Krøkedans	1287	Sættargjerden
	Ivar Olavsson	M	Aspa	Known 1307–23	
	Lodin Lepp	M		Known 1277–1288	
	Jon Brynjolfsson	M	Kvåle	Known 1299	DN II, nr. 54
	Jon Raud Ivarsson to Sudrheim	M	Sudrheim	1302 - 1314	Sættargjerden
	Ogmund Krøkedans	M	Krøkedans	Known 1261	Håkon Håkonssons saga
	Ogmund Sigurdsson to Hesby	M	Hesby	Before 1311	DN I, nr. 79
	Snare Aslaksson to Huseby	M		Known 1303	DN I, nr. 92
	Sebjørn Helgesson i Bellagård	M		Known 1291–1322/24	Sættargjerden
	Tore Håkonsson to Lekum	M	Biskopsson		Sættargjerden
	Vidkunn Erlingsson	M	Bjarkøy		DN I, nr. 71
	Vigleik Audunsson	M		Known 1277	Sættargjerden

==== Knights (Ridder) ====
C.o.a.	Name of receiver	House	Title held	Ref.
	Agmund Berdorsson Bolt	Bolt		
	Alf Haraldsson Bolt	Bolt		
	Alv Knutsson	Tre Roser		
	Arne Serksson Båt	Båt	Known 1303	
	Eiliv Eilivsson	Naustdal		
	Einar Olavsson Fluga	Fluga	Known 1482	
	Einrid Erlendsson	Losna		
	Erling Vidkunsson to Bjarkøy & Giske	Bjarkøy		
	Finn Ogmundsson to Hesby			
	Gaute Eriksson	Galte		
	Guttorm Eivindsson			
	Guttorm Kolbjørnsson			
	Hallvard Jonson Smør	Smør		
	Hans Kruckow	Kruckow		
	Havtore Jonsson to Sørum	Sudrheim		
	Jon Havtoresson to Sørum	Sudrheim		
	Sigurd Havtoresson of Sørum	Sudrheim		
	Hermann Moltke	von Molteke	Known 1449	
	Ivar Ogmundsson Rova			
	Jon Ragnvaldsson Smør	Smør		
	Jon Svalesson Smør	Smør		
	Jon Toraldesson		Known 1351–1370	
	Jøns Erengislesson Hjerne	Hjerne	before 1379	
	Kolbjørn Arnaldsson Gerst	Gerst		
	Malis Sparre			
	Nikulas Gunnarsson Kane	Kane	1444	
	Gaute Toraldsson Kane	Kane	1450	
	Gaute Nikulasson Kane	Kane		
	Ogmund Finnsson til Hesby			
	Olav to Foss	Rev of Ryfylke		
	Olav Nilsson to Talgje	Skanke		
	Otte Rømer	Rømer		
	Peder Fleming	Fleming	after 1406	
	Pål Eriksson			
	Sigurd Brynjolfsson to Aga			
	Sigurd Jonsson	Stjerne of Suðrheim		
	Svale Jonsson Smør	Smør	1458-1483	
	Thore Endridsson Harf			
	Torvald Toresson			
	Vidkunn Erlingsson to Bjarkøy	Bjarkøy		
	Bo Flemming to Nesøya	Flemming	1457	

Squire (Væpner)

C.o.a.	Name of receiver	House	Title held	Ref.
	Henrik Friis to Holme	Friis	Known 1489	
	Anders Pæs		Known 1443	
	Anders Hansson		Known 1543	DN XI, nr. 661
	Jon Ellingsson		Known 1538	
	Bo Flemming to Nesøya	Bo Flemming to Nesøya	Known 1456	
	Peder Frak	Frakk	Known 1488	
	Daniel Grodtt to Kjølberg	Grott	Known 1524	DN VII, nr. 584, DN X, nr. 701
	Sigurd Havtoresson	Sudrheim	Known 1342	DN VI, nr. 166,
	Anders Sæbjørnsson	Hornes	Known 1511	DN I, nr. 1030 / DN V, nr. 1046
	Herlog Halvardsen Hudfat	Hudfat	-1508	Herredagsdombøker 1508
	Peder Herlogsen Hudfat	Hudfat		DN X, nr. 702
	Arild Ottesson Kane	Kane	-1496	
	Wolfgang Kerthe to Stedje	Kerte	Known 1526	DN XXI, nr. 749
	Erik Kiiel to Elin	Kiil	Known 1552	DN XII, s. 132 and s. 788
	Bjørn to Kjerrslett	Kjerrslett (Bamse)	Known 1452	DN XXI, nr. 466
	Erlend Filippusson	Losna	Known 1366	DN I, nr. 394
	Magnus Magnusson of Giske		Known 1423	DN I, nr. 691
	Mattis Olsson		Known 1492	DN II, nr. 968
	Mattis Pedersson		Known 1461	DN VII, nr. 459
	Lodin Thorkelsson		Known 1371	DN XII, nr. 107
	Svale Jonsson	Smør		
	Christoffer Throndsson	Rustung	Known 1535-65	DN XI, nr. 611
	Kjell Thordsson to Tjern	Tjerne	Known 1524-32	DN VII, nr. 584

=== Modern aristocratic families ===
Years of denoblement (extinction) refer to when the last noble male member died. It should, however, be noted that several letters patent treated men and women equally; when unmarried or widowed, such women had a personal and independent status as noble. An example is the letters patent of the Løvenskiold family, which uses the term 'legitimate issue of the male and the female sexus'.

==== Marquises ====
C.o.a.	Name of title	Name of receiver	Sexus	Name of inheriting family	Creation	Abolishment	Country of location	Ref.
	Marquisate of Lista	Hugo Octavius Accoramboni (Italian)	M	No inheritors.	1709		Norway	
	Marquisate of Mandal	Francisco di Ratta (Italian); Giuseppe di Ratta (Italian); Luigi di Ratta (Italian)	M M M	di Ratta	1710	1821 (Norway); 1890 (Denmark)	Norway	

==== Feudal counts in Denmark-Norway ====
C.o.a.	Name of fief	P.	Name of receiver	Sexus	Name of inheriting family	Erection	Dissolution	Country of location	Ref.
	Countship of Antvorskov		Elisabeth Helene von Vieregg	F	Vieregg	1703		Denmark	
	Countship of Brahesminde		Preben Bille-Brahe	M	Bille-Brahe Bille-Brahe-Selby	1798	1928	Denmark	
	Countship of Brandt		Enevold Brandt	M	Brandt	1771	1772	Denmark	
	Countship of Bregentved		Adam Gottlob von Moltke	M	Moltke	1750	1922	Denmark	
	Countship of Christiansborg		Christian Ditlev Frederik Reventlow	M	Reventlow	1729	1924	Denmark	
	Countship of Christiansholm		Christian Raben	M	Raben Raben-Levetzau	1734	1921	Denmark	
	Countship of Frederiksholm		Charlotte Helene von Schindel	F	von Schindel	1710	1716	Denmark	
	Countship of Frijsenborg		Mogens Friis	M	Friis	1672	1920	Denmark	
	Countship of Griffenfeld		Peder Griffenfeld	M	Griffenfeld	1673	1676	Norway	
	Countship of Gyldensteen		Jean Henri Huguetan (French)	M	Huguetan Knuth Bernstorff-Gyldensten	1720	1922	Denmark	
	Countship of Holsteinborg		Ulrich Adolph von Holstein	M	von Holstein	1708	1921	Denmark	
	Countship of Jarlsberg		Gustav Wilhelm von Wedel	M	Wedel-Jarlsberg	1684	1821 (fief); 1893 (recognition of title)	Norway	
	Countship of Knuthenborg		Adam Christopher Knuth	M	Knuth	1714	1926	Denmark	
	Countship of Langeland		Frederik Ahlefeldt	M	Ahlefeldt Ahlefeldt-Laurvig	1672	1928	Denmark	
	Countship of Larvik		Ulrik Frederik Gyldenløve	M	Gyldenløve Danneskiold-Laurvig Ahlefeldt-Laurvigen	1761	1805	Norway	
	Countship of Ledreborg		Johan Ludvig von Holstein	M	von Holstein	1746	1926	Denmark	
	Countship of Lindenborg		Heinrich Carl von Schimmelmann	M	von Schimmelmann	1781	1923	Denmark	
	Countship of Løvenholm (1st creation)		Ditlev Ranzau	M	Rantzau	1674	1726	Denmark	
	Countship of Løvenholm (2nd creation)		Frederik Christian Danneskiold-Samsøe	M	Danneskiold-Samsøe	1732	1741	Denmark	
	Countship of Muckadell		Albrecht Christopher Schaffalitzky de Muckadell	M	Schaffalitzky de Muckadell	1784	1925	Denmark	
	Comital Præcipuum of Rantzau		Christian Rantzau	M	Rantzau	1756	1921	Denmark	
	Countship of Reventlow		Conrad von Reventlow	M	Reventlow	1685	1924	Denmark	
	Countship of Roepstorff		Ulrich Wilhelm Roepstorff	M	Roepstorff	1810	1921	Denmark	
	Countship of Samsøe		Sophie Amalie Moth	F	Moth Danneskiold-Samsøe	1677	1921	Denmark	
	Countship of Schackenborg		Otto Diderik Schack	M	Schack	1676	1924	Denmark	
	Countship of Scheel		Christen Scheel	M	Scheel	1725	1807	Denmark	
	Countship of Struensee		Johann Friedrich Struensee	M	Struensee	1771	1772	Denmark	
	Countship of Sølvisborg		Cornelis Tromp	M	Tromp	1676	1679	Blekinge	
	Countship of Tønsberg		Ulrik Fredrik Gyldenløve	M	Gyldenløve	1676	1683	Norway	
	Countship of Vallø		Queen Anne Sophie, née Reventlow	F	Reventlow	1713	1730	Denmark	
	Countship of Wedellsborg		Wilhelm Friedrich von Wedell	M	Wedell-Wedellsborg	1672	After 1919.	Denmark	

==== Feudal barons in Denmark-Norway ====
C.o.a.	Name of fief	P.	Name of receiver	Sexus	Name of inheriting family	Erection	Dissolution	Country of location	Ref.
	Barony of Adelersborg		Frederik Adeler	M	Adeler	1785		Denmark	
	Barony of Brahetrolleborg		Birgitte Trolle	F	Trolle Reventlow	1672	1864	Denmark	
	Barony of Christiansdal		Ide Margrethe Reventlow	F	Knuth	1743	1821	Denmark	
	Barony of Conradsborg		Christian Frederik Knuth	M	Knuth	1743		Denmark	
	Barony of Einsiedelsborg		Mouritz Podebusk	M	Podebusk	1676		Denmark	
	Barony of Frisenvold		Mogens Friis	M	Friis	1672	1683	Denmark	
	Barony of Fuirendal		Ulrich Adolph von Holstein	M	Holstein	1700	1708	Denmark	
	Barony of Gavnø		Otto Reedtz-Thott	M	Reedtz-Thott	1805	After 1919.	Denmark	
	Barony of Guldborgland		Poul Abraham Lehn	M	Lehn	1784	After 1919.	Denmark	
	Barony of Holberg		Ludvig Holberg (Norwegian)	M	Holberg	1747	1754	Denmark	
	Barony of Holckenhavn		Eiler Holck	M	Holck	1672	1921	Denmark	
	Barony of Holstenshuus		Adam Christopher Holsten	M	von Holsten	1779	1923	Denmark	
	Barony of Høegholm		Iver Juul Høeg	M	Banner/Høeg	1681	1700	Denmark	
	Barony of Juellinge		Jens Juel	M	1672-1708 Juel 1708-1771 Juel-Vind 1771-1867 Krag-Juel-Vind 1867- Krag-Juel-Vind-Frijs	1672	1921	Denmark	
	Barony of Lehn		Poul Abraham Lehn	M	Lehn	1780	1925	Denmark	
	Barony of Lindenborg		Sophie Amalie Lindenov	F	Lindenov	1681	1781	Denmark	
	Barony of Løvenborg		Severin Løvenskiold (Norwegian)	M	Løvenskiold	1773	1921	Denmark	
	Barony of Marselisborg		Constantin Marselis (Dutch)	M	Marselis Fædder-Charisius	1680	1699	Denmark	
	Barony of Rosendal (1st creation)		Ludwig Holgersen Rosenkrantz	M	Rosenkrantz	1678	1723	Norway	
	Barony of Rosendal (2st creation)		Marchus Gerhard Londeman af Rosencrone	M	Rosencrone	1779	1814	Norway	
	Barony of Rosenlund		Holger Rosenkrantz	M	Rosenkrantz	1748	1788	Denmark	
	Barony of Rusenstein		Henrik Ruse (Dutch)	M	1671-1679 Ruse Baron af Rusenstein 1679-1960 Juul Baron af Rysensteen	1671	1797	Denmark	
	Barony of Scheelenborg		Friedrich von Vittinghof genannt von Scheel	M	Vittinghof-Scheel	1680	1923	Denmark	
	Barony of Stampenborg		Holger Stampe	M	Stampe	1809	1924	Denmark	
	Barony of Willestrup		Werner Rosenkrantz	M	Rosenkrantz	1757	1845	Denmark	
	Barony of Wintersborg		Helmuth Otto von Winterfeld	M	Winterfeld	1673	1801	Denmark	
	Barony of Wilhelmsborg		Vilhelm Marselis (Dutch)	M	Güldencrone	1673	1921	Denmark	

==== Titular counts, titular barons, and nobility in Denmark-Norway ====
C.o.a.	Name	Classification	Ennoblement	Denoblement	Primary country/-ies	Ref.
	Abildgaard	Noble	Ancient nobility from Jutland.	1705 by extinction.	Denmark	
	Adeler	Noble	1666 Nobility patent for admiral Cort Sivertsen Adeler.		Norway and Denmark	
	Lente-Adeler	Noble	1757 and 1758 patent for brothers Chr. and Theodorus Adeler with name Lente af Adeler.	1804 by extinction.	Denmark	
	af Adeler	Baron	1784 Baron patent for Conrad Vilhelm Adeler to Dragsholm.	1849 line extinction.	Denmark	
	von Ahlefeldt	Noble	Ancient nobility from Holstein.		Denmark and Norway	
	af Ahlefeldt	Count	1672 Count patent for Burchard Ahlefeldt.		Denmark	
	von Ahlefeldt-Dehn	Baron			Denmark	
	Ahlefeldt-Laurvigen	Count	1785 license for count Chr. Ahlefeldt af Langeland with the name Ahlefeldt-Laurvigen.	Alive in Denmark.	Denmark and Norway	
	de Albertin	Noble	1749 nobility patent for Peter Albertin with name von or de Albertin. He died without sons.	1779 by extinction.	Denmark	
	von Ahnen	Noble	Ancient nobility from Pomerania. Came to Norway with Claus von Ahnen (-1628).	1772 extinction with Iver von Ahnen.	Norway and Denmark	
	Akeleye	Noble	Ancient nobility from Funen. Came to Norway in 1700s.	1882 by extinction.	Denmark and Norway	
	af Aldenburg	Count	1671 Naturalisation patent for count Anton af Aldenburg.	1738 by extinction.	Denmark	
	Alleby-ætten	Noble	Ander Eriksson, Councilman in Konghelle (1610)		Norway	
	Amund Sigurdsson	Noble	Amund Sigurdsson, Councilman in Skienssyssel (1500).		Norway	
	Andenes-slekten	Noble	Known with squire Per Amundsson to Andenes.		Norway	
	Anders Hanssons ætt	Noble	Ancient nobility from Norway. Known hit squire Anders Hansson, mayor in Bergen (1536–39). A squire Knut Madsson in Lund uses the same coat of arms.		Norway	
	Anker	Noble	1778 Naturalisation patent for brothers Bernhard, Peder, and Jess Ancher. Later in 1778 and in 1700 naturalisation patent for more members of the family.	Alive.	Norway	
	von Anrep	Noble	Ancient nobility from Westphalia. Came to Denmark from Øsel in 1577 with Reinholt von Anrep.		Denmark	
	von Ansbach	Noble	Came to Norway about 1540 with Jørgen von Ansbach (1510–1591).	by extinction	Norway	
	von Arenfeldt	Noble	Ancient nobility from Zealand. Came to Norway in 1700s with Lieutenant Colonel Axel Arenfeldt (-1745).		Norway and Denmark	
	von Arenstorff	Noble	1670 Naturalisation patent for colonel Friedrich von Arenstorff (1626–1689). Came to Norway with Lieutenant Colonel Heinrich von Arenstorff (-1712) to Vernø Abbey.	1963 by extinction.	Denmark and Norway	
	von Arentskiold	Noble	1714 nobility patent for colonel E. L. von Arentzen with name Arentskiold.	He died without sons.	Denmark	
	Armødling-ætten or Arnung	Noble	Ancient high nobility from Norway. First known with earl Arnmod.		Norway	
	von Arnold	Noble	Ancient nobility from Estonia. Came to Norway about 1660 with major general Johan von Arnoldt to Borrestad (1638–1709).	1768 line extinction.	Norway	
	von Aschersleben	Noble	Ancient nobility from Mecklenburg. Known with Jørgen von Aschersleben 1601.		Denmark	
	Asdal-folk	Noble	Ancient nobility from Norway. Known in 1300s with brothers Torbjørn Halvorsson Asdal and Roar Halvorsson Asdal.		Norway	
	Aspa	Noble	Several ancient nobility families related to the Aspa estate in Nordmøre.	1500s by extinction.	Norway	
	Aspenäsætten	Noble	Ancient nobility from Sweden. Came Norway in 1300s with squire Ulf Jonsson.		Sweden and Norway	
	Astrup	Noble	1810 nobility patent for Hågen Chr. Astrup.	Alive.	Denmark	
	de Aubert	Noble	1776 naturalisation patent for major general François Jacques Xavier Aubert (1726–93).	Alive.	Norway	
	Augustin	Noble	Ancient nobility from Mechlenburg. Known in Norway in 1404 with Peder Augustin.		Norway	
	Aurlandætten	Noble	Ancient nobility from Norway. Known first 900s with lendermann Brynjulf Bjørnsson in Aurland.		Norway	
	Bagge av Hatteberg	Noble	Ancient nobility from Norway. Known with squire Olav Gunnarsson Bagge to Hatteberg (-1525).		Norway	
	Bagge av Holmgård	Noble	1582 Nobility letter for Peder Bagge to Holme.	17th century by extinction	Norway	
	Bagge av Rafoss	Noble	Known with Gasse Thorkelsson 1520, and his son Stig Gasesen Bagge 1541.		Norway	
	Bagge av Valen	Noble	Known with Olav Bagge på Valen (1530–1614).		Norway	
	de Bang	Noble	1777 naturalisation patent for Oluf Lundt Bang.		Denmark	
	Banner	Noble	Ancient nobility from Jutland. Came to Norway with major general Erik Ottesen Banner (1618–1687).		Denmark and Norway	
	af Barby	Count	Ancient nobility form Germany. Known in Denmark with Günther, count of Barby, died 1572.		Denmark	
	Barfod	Noble	1455 nobility letter for Jens Barfod.		Denmark	
	Barfus	Noble	Ancient nobility from Altmark.		Denmark	
	von Barnekow	Noble	Ancient nobility from Mecklenburg and Pommerania.		Denmark	
	von Bartlin	Noble	1674 nobility patent for Caspar Bartholin with name von Bartlin.	1730 by extinction with Caspar von Bartlin	Denmark	
	Bartholin	Noble	1731 nobility patent for the sons of Thomas Bartholin (-1680).	Alive.	Denmark	
	von Baudissin or Bauditz	Noble	Ancient nobility from Silesia. Colonel Wulff Heinrich von Baudissin went in service of King Christian IV.	Alive.	Denmark	
	Beck	Noble	Ancient nobility from Zealand.		Denmark	
	Behr or Beer	Noble	Ancient nobility from Mecklenburg. Known in Norway in 1430 with Diderik Beer.	Descendants unknown.	Denmark	
	von Below	Noble	Ancient nobility from Mecklenburg. One Henrik von Below came to Denmark in 1575. Came to Norway with governor Henrik Below.	1700 Danish-Norwegian line extinction with Claus Below.	Denmark and Norway	
	Benkestok	Noble	Ancient nobility from Norway. Known first about 1320 with Tord Benkestokk.	1600s	Norway	
	Bent Hemmingssons ætt	Noble	Ancient nobility from Norway. Known in 1500s with Bent Hemmingsson.		Norway	
	Bent Karlsson	Noble	Ancient nobility from Norway. Known from 1533 with squire Bent Karlsson.		Norway	
	Bent Mogensson	Noble	Ancient nobility from Norway. Known from 1504 with squire Bent Mogensson.		Norway	
	Benzon	Noble	1679 Amorial letter for brothers Niels and Peter Benzon. Came to Norway with Niels son stattholder Jacob Benzon (1688–1775).	1709	Denmark and Norway	
	von Benzon	Noble	1679 Amorial letter for Hans Benzon. Came to Norway in 1900s with Egon von Benzon (1918 -1995) descendant of assessor Hans Benzon (1657–1715) his children was elevated to nobility in 1717.	Alive.	Denmark and Norway	
	Benzon	Noble	1717 Nobility patent for Hans Søfrensens children.		Denmark	
	von Bergen	Noble	Ancient nobility from Rügen. Known in Norway with 1400s with Lyder von Bergen.		Norway	
	Bergsvein Bårdsson	Noble	Ancient nobility from Norway. Known in 1355 with Bergsvein Bårdsson.		Norway	
	von Berlin	Noble	Known in Norway in 1650 with Cort von Berlin to Scharnaggergård.		Norway	
	Berner	Noble	1780 nobility patent for Alexander Berner.	Alive.	Denmark	
	"Bernhoft" or "Bjørnehode"	Noble	1503 Nobility letter for Erik Hanssen, mayor in Middelfart. Came to Norway with his son Christoffer Eriksson “Bjørnehode” (-1563) til Hananger. The name is given later and was never used by the family.		Denmark and Norway	
	af Bernstoff	Count	1767 count patent for brothers Johan Hartvig Ernst and Andreas Gottlieb Bernstorff.	Alive.	Denmark	
	Berregaard	Noble	1726 by letter.	1902 by extinction.	Denmark	
	von Bertouch	Noble	Old Brabantian nobility family. Came to Norway with Major General Georg von Bertouch (1668–1743). His son colonel Carl Rudolp de Bertouch's children received in 1777 naturalisation patent.		Norway and Denmark	
	Beyer	Noble	Ancient nobility from Sogn. Known in 1500s in Bergen with Absalon Pedersson Beyer.		Norway	
	Biermann von Ehrenschild		1681 Amorial letter and 1693 renewal letter for Conrad Bierman to Buskerudgård with the name Bierman von Ehrenskild.	1754 by extinction.	Norway	
	Bild	Noble	Ancient nobility from Fyn. Also use names Strangensen, Frost, Hase and Croch.	1622 extinction with Niels Bild to Ravnholt.	Denmark and Norway	
	Bildt	Noble	Ancient nobility form Jutland. Came to Norway about 1585 with Daniel Knudssøn Bildt (about 1531–1585).	1719 extinction in Norway.	Norway and Denmark	
	Bille	Noble	Ancient nobility form Zealand. Known first in Norway in 1500s with knight Eske Bille (about 1480–1552) and knight Claus Steensen Bille (about 1490–1558). Migrated again 1800s with postmaster Jess Fæster Bille.		Denmark and Norway	
	Biskopætten or Manvikætten	Noble	Ancient nobility from Norway. Known from 1200s with Håkon, bishop of Oslo. His son Tore Biskopson to Lekum was baron of Tønsberg.	1400s by extinction	Norway	
	Bjarkøy	Noble	Ancient nobility from Troms. First known with Tore Hund.		Norway	
	Bjelke	Noble	Ancient nobility from Scania. Known in Norway from 1537 with Jens Tillufsen Bjelke.	1868 by extinction	Denmark and Norway	
	"Bjørn"	Noble	1457 Nobility letter for Bjørn Þorleifsson in Norway. 1620 Nobility confirmation for Bjørn Þorleifsson descendants in Iceland.		Norway and Iceland	
	Blindheim	Noble	Ancient nobility from Norway, also known as Blindheim-menne/ætten. Known in the 1100s with Hallkel Huk.	1200s by extinction	Norway	
	Blikk	Noble	Known in Norway in 1525 with squire Michel Blikk.		Denmark and Norway	
	Blix	Noble	Ancient nobility from Jämtland.		Norway and Sweden	
	Blixencrone	Noble	1712 Nobility patent for Hans Hanssøn Blix (1661–1730).	1730	Norway	
	de Blixenskiold	Noble	1749 Nobility patent for Thomas Anderssøn Blix.	1757	Norway	
	Blome	Noble	Ancient nobility from Holstein. 1647 Nobility rights for Didrik Blome. Known in Norway from the 1600s whiit Anders Blome to Blomesholm.	1945 by extinction	Denmark and Norway	
	von Blücher	Noble	Ancient nobility from Pomerania. 1777 Naturalisation patent for colonel Carl von Blüchers widow and children. Came to Norway with major general Gottfried Carl Wilhelm Gottlob von Blücher.	Alive as count Blücher af Altona.	Denmark and Norway	
	Bockholt	Noble	Ancient nobility from Livonia. Came to Iceland in 1500s with John Bockholt (1570–1600).		Iceland and Denmark	
	Bolt	Noble	Ancient nobility from Norway. First known with Alv Sigerstad Bolt.	1500s by extinction	Norway	
	Bolten	Baron	1783 baron patent for Henrik Bolte with the name Bolten.	1792 by extinction with baron Johan Henrik Bolten.	Denmark	
	Bornemann	Patrician	Came to Norway with bishop Oluf Bornemann (1683–1747). Norwegian line never got nobility patent. First line with formal nobility patetent 1731, line extinct sune after. Next line 1811 nobility patent for major Cosmus Bornemann.	18th century by extinction	Denmark and Norway	
	de Bosc de la Calmette	Noble	Nobility form France. 1776 Naturalisation patent for captain of the cavalry G. P. A. Bose de la Calmette and 1777 for captain Charles Bose de la Calmette.	1820 by extinction with Charles Reinhard Bosc de la Calmette.	Denmark	
	Botner	Noble	Ancient nobility from Romerike. 1765 Renewal patent for general adjutant Andreas Gudbrandsen von Botner (ca. 1724–1784).	1784 by extinction.	Norway	
	Bourke	Noble	Ancient nobility from Ireland. 1779 naturalisation patent for Theoblad Bourke on St. Croix.	By extinction with Th. R. G. Bourke.	Danish West Indies	
	Braem	Noble	1713 Nobility patent for Gothard Braem to Gjessingsggård (-1733). 1731 Nobility patent for his cousin Christian Bream.	1733 extinction first line. 1790 Second line extinction with captin Johan Braem to Asmild abby.	Denmark	
	Brahe	Noble	Ancient nobility from Scania and Halland. Came to Norway in 1600s with Mandrup Brahe (1628–1666).	1786 extinction with Lieutenant colonel Preben Brahe.	Denmark and Norway	
	Brandt	Count	1771 count patent for Enevold Brandt. Patent discarded by judgment in 1772.	1772	Denmark	
	Bratt (af Höglunda)	Noble	Ancient nobility from Norway. Nils Brath moved toin Swedish. Remigrated to Norway whit Fredrik Alexander Bratt in 1800s	1984 by extinction	Norway and Sweden	
	Bratt (Bjølstadætten)	Noble	Ancient nobility from Gudbrandsdalen. Known form the 1200s.	1866 by extinction.	Norway	
	von Bredow	Noble	Ancient nobility from Brandenburg. 1642 nobility grant for Akim von Bredow. He died 1660 without sons.	1660 by extinction.	Denmark	
	Breide	Noble	Ancient nobility from Holstein. Known in Norway in the 16th century with Margrete Breide.	1675 extinction with Bendix Breide.	Norway and Denmark	
	Brems	Noble	Known in 1500s with Peder Fredriksson Brems (1550–1633), Mayor of Marstrand in 1585. And Niels Michelsen Brems (1631–1705).	by extinction	Norway	
	le Normand de Bretteville	Noble	Ancient nobility from Normandy, France. 1804 naturalisation letter for major general Louis Claude le Normand de Bretteville. Came to Norway in 1799 with his son Charles Eugène le Normand de Bretteville (1782–1854).		Denmark and Norway	
	Briand de Crèvecœur	Noble	1781 Naturalisation patent for Jens Philibert and 1784 for Hans Fr. de Briand de Crèvecœur.	1786 First line extinction. 1827 Second line extinction.	Denmark	
	Brok (af Estrup)	Noble	Ancient nobility from Jutland.	1625 by extinction.	Denmark	
	Brock (of Barløsegård)	Noble	Ancient nobility from Funen.	1591 by extinction.	Denmark	
	von Brockdorff	Noble	Ancient nobility from Holstein. Came to Norway with chamberlain August Friedrich von Brockdorff (1745–1802).		Denmark and Norway	
	Brockenhuus	Noble	Ancient nobility from Funen or from Germany. Several lines has immigrated to Norway. First line came to Norway in 1500s originating from Henrik Brockenhuus to Søndergårde, whose son Eiler Brockenhuus married Kirsten Eriksdatter Gyldenhorn til Eline. Second line immigrated to Norway in 1600s with colonel Jørgen Otto Brockenhuus.		Denmark and Norway	
	Brun	Noble	Ancient nobility from Bohuslän. Known with Gerik Brun, mayor in Konghelle (1484).		Norway	
	Brun	Noble	Ancient nobility from Marstrand and Konghelle. Known from 1490s with Torkel Brun.		Norway	
	Brun (af Kongstedlund)	Noble	Ancient nobility from Jutland. Known in Norway with Christen Brun til Vese (known 1591).		Denmark and Norway	
	Brun (af Vindumgaard)	Noble			Denmark and Norway	
	Brun (af Skåne)				Denmark	
	Brun	Noble	Rangadel. Came to Norway with major Peder Bruun.		Norway	
	de Bruyn	Noble	Known in Norway with Jacob de Bruyn.		Denmark and Norway	
	Brügmann	Patrician	1680 Amorial letter for brothers Nicolai and D.L. Brügmann. Came to Norway in 1750? with colonel Nicolai Brügmann (1717–1788).	1821 extinction with Fr. L. Chr. Brügmann.	Denmark and Norway	
	von Bruenech	Noble	Ancient nobility from Germany. Came to Norway with captin Caspar Georg von Brüneck.		Norway	
	Bryske	Noble	Ancient nobility from Fyn. Gertrud Eilersdatter Bryske married Iver Vincentsen Lunge.	1631extinction with Sivert Bryske.	Denmark and Norway	
	von Buchwald	Noble	Ancient nobility from Holstein. 1642 Nobility license for Frederik von Buchwaldt. Came to Norway in 1600s with Johan Richard von Buchwald.		Denmark and Norway	
	Budde	Noble	Ancient nobility from Øsel. Came to Norway in 1649 with colonel Frederik Budde.	1725? line extinction.	Norway	
	Bulse	Noble	Ancient nobility from Bohuslän. Known from 1300s with Gamle Bulse to Ordost.		Norway	
	Buk	Noble	Ancient nobility from Norway. Known in 1400s with Markvard Buk 1407 and Oluf Buk 1449.		Norway	
	Bydelsbak fra Bergentved	Noble	Ancient nobility possibly from Württemberg. Know in Norway in the 15th century with knight Albrecht Bydelsbak (known 1429).		Norway and Denmark	
	von Bülow	Noble	Ancient nobility from Mecklenburg. To line has immigranted to Norway. First in the 1600s with colonel Jacob Bülow (-1686) of the line Wedendorf. And later in the 1800s with Johan Hartvig Victor Carl von Bülow (1754–1823) of the line Radum-Tøistrup.		Denmark and Norway	
	Byting	Noble	Ancient nobility from Sweden and Norway. Known in Norway from 1400s with Herman Trulsson (-1503), bishop of Hamar.		Norway and Sweden	
	Båt	Noble	Ancient nobility from Sweden. Known with Ture Bonde (-1412), his son knight Aslak Turesson and knight Knud Knudsson til Moland.	1519 extinction with knight Knud Knudsson Båt to Moland.	Sweden and Norway	
	Castenschiold	Noble	1745 nobility patent for J. K. Castens with name Castenschiold. Later in 1871 name was changed to Castenskiold.	Alive.	Denmark	
	de Castonier	Noble	French Huguenot letter-nobility from Lorraine. Came to Norway with the brothers Falck Daniel and Hans Helmuth de Castonier in the early 18th century.	Alive.	Denmark and Norway	
	Cederfeld de Simonsen	Noble	1759 Nobility patent for Bartholomæus Bertelsen with the name de Cederfeld. Resolution 1798 for L. C. E. de Cederfeld to use the name Cederfeld de Simonsen.	Alive.	Denmark and Norway	
	Charisius	Noble	1659 nobility patent.	1787 by extinction	Denmark	
	Clauson-Kaas	Noble	1804 nobility patent for Conrad Fr. Clauson and his sister for application by their stepfather Fr. Julius Kaas.	Alive.	Norway and Denmark	
	de Cicignon	Noble	Nobility from Luxembourg. Came to Norway in 1662 with major general Johan Caspar de Cicignon.		Norway	
	Claus Jenssons ætt	Noble	Ancient nobility from Bohuslän. Known with Claus Jensson in 1582 and 1591.		Norway	
	von Clausewitz	Noble	Came to Norway with Fredrik von Clusewitz and Peter von Clausewitz. (Danske og norske Officerer 1648–1814) av J.C.W. Hirsch og K. Hirsch. Fredrikshald		Norway, Denmark And Germany	
	de Coucheron	Noble	Nobility from the Netherlands. Came to Norway about 1657 with colonel Willem de Coucheron. Anton Jacob Coucheron (-1736) titled "høyædle og velbaaren".		Norway	
	de Créqui dit la Roche	Noble	Nobility from the Netherlands. Came to Norway in 1657 with Lieutenant Colonel Ahasverus de Créqui dit la Roche.		Norway	
	Cunningham	Noble	Ancient nobility from Scotland. Came to Norway in 1600s with John Cunningham (-1651), illegitimate son of lord John Cunningham, his father got his son naturalisated in 1596.		Norway	
	Dag Eilivssons ætt	Noble	Ancient nobility from Norway. Known in 1100s with lendmann Dag Eilivsson of Bratsberg. His son lendmann Gregorius Dagsson (-1161).		Norway	
	Dahlepil	Noble	1506 nobility letter for Anders Svendsen.	1815 by extinction	Norway and Sweden	
	von der Dame	Noble	Known in 1400s with Baltazar von der Dame (1411 in Bergen).	by extinction	Norway	
	Danneskiold-Laurvig	Count	1695 Count patent for Ulrik Frederik Gyldenløves children with countess Antoninette Augusta of Aldenburg.	1783 by extinction	Denmark and Norway	
	Danneskiold-Samsøe	Count	1695 count patent for descendants of Christian V sons with Sophie Amalie Moth, counts Chr. and Ulrik Chr. Gyldenløve.		Denmark	
	Danneskiold-Løwendal	Count	Patents 1786 and 1787 for French marshal count F. X. J. af Løwendal with the name Danneskiold-Løwendal.	1829 by extinction	Denmark	
	Darre	Noble	Ancient nobility from Norway. Know with Jon Darre in 1331 and Karl Jonsson Darre in 1422.	15th century by extinction	Norway	
	von Deden	Noble	Ancient nobility from the Duchy of Schleswig. Came to Norway with Hartvig Otto von Deden.		Denmark and Norway	
	Desmercières	Noble	1776 naturalisation patent for Johan Henrik Desmercières; died 1779 without sons.	1778 by extinction	Denmark	
	Dirik Olavsson	Noble	Ancient nobility from Skien. Known with squire Dirik Olavsson in 1500 and 1505.		Norway	
	von Donop	Noble	Ancient nobility from Lower Saxony/Lippe. Came first to Denmark with Bernhard Friderich von Donop to Maspe and Hassegrund.		Denmark and Norway	
	Drefeld	Noble	Ancient nobility from Zealand and Scania	1607 by extinction.	Denmark	
	Dresselberg	Noble	Ancient nobility from Zealand. Came to Norway in 1500s with Hans Nielsson Dresselberg (1549–1616).		Denmark and Norway	
	Dringelberg	Noble	Ancient nobility from Scania. Known in Norway in 1500s with Hans Dringelberg.	1622 extinction with Herman Dringelberg.	Denmark and Norway	
	Due	Noble		1558 by extinction.	Denmark	
	Due	Noble	1464 nobility confirmation for major Iver Due.	1654 by extinction.	Denmark and Norway	
	Due (of Ølstedsgård)	Noble	1505 nobility letter for Henrik Nielsen. Renewal letter in the middle of 1600s.	By extinction the late 1600s	Norway and Denmark	
	Due or Taube	Noble	Ancient nobility in Germany, Livonia and Sweden with name Taube. Came to Denmark in 1571 with Johan Taube.	1710 by extinction.	Denmark and Norway	
	Daa	Noble	Ancient nobility from Denmark. Came to Norway in 1500s with Herulf Trolle Daa.	1712 by extinction.	Denmark and Norway	
	von Ellbrecht	Noble	Ancient nobility from Schleswig or Oldenburg. Came to Denmark with Anton Günther von Ellbrecht, who received naturalisation in 1778.		Denmark	
	von Eickstedt af Wintersborg	Baron	1725 baron patent for colonel Christopher von Eickstedt as baron af Winersborg. He died without sons.	1728 by extinction.	Denmark	
	"Ekorn"	Noble	1497 Nobility letter for Nils Matsson, Councilman in Konghelle.	by extinction.	Norway	
	Emmiksen	Noble	Ancient nobility from South Jutland (Schleswig).	1615 by extinction.	Denmark	
	Fabritius de Tengnagel	Noble	1778 nobility patent for brothers of Michael Fabritius with name Fabritius-Tengnagel.	Alive.	Denmark	
	Falkenskiold	Noble	1716 nobility patent for colonel Martin Düssel and captin Christoffer Düssel to Hald abby.	Alive.	Denmark	
	de Falsen	Noble	1758 Nobility patent for mayor Enevold Falsen and his brother Johan Eskild Falsen.	Alive.	Norway	
	de Falster	Noble	kommandørkaptein Michael de Falster		Denmark and Norway	
	Fasti	Noble	Ancient nobility from Denmark.	1628 by extinction with Jørgen Splid.	Denmark	
	Fikkesen	Noble	Ancient nobility from Zealand.	1586 by extinction.	Denmark	
	Flemming	Noble	First known with knight Peder Fleming (-after 1406), who was possibly endowed to the bishop's farm Huseby in Aker. Came to Norway again with Bo Flemming to Nesøya (-after 1491), feudal lord of Tønsberg, married Sigrid Erlendsdatter of Losnaætten, and took part in her inheritance after the Sudreims. Their daughter Margrethe Flemming inherited the parents' estate, and brought it to her husband Holger Rosenkrantz.	1544 Danish-Norwegian line extinction.	Norway, Denmark and Sweden.	
	von Folsach	Noble	1760 nobility patent for Christian Michael Folsach to Gjessinggård.	Alive.	Denmark	
	Fredberg	Noble	1450 nobility letter for Jens Jensen Fredberg.		Denmark	
	Fridag	Noble	Ancient nobility from Westphalia. Came to Norway in 1500s with Axel Fredriksen Fridag.		Norway	
	Friis of Arlevad	Noble	Ancient nobility from South Jutland. Possibly have the same origin as Jul.	1550 by extinction.	Denmark	
	Friis av Haraldskær	Noble	Ancient nobility from Southern Jutland. Came to Norway in 16th century with Jørgen Friis.	1727 by extinction with colonel Chr. Friis to Hevringholm	Denmark and Norway	
	Friis from Hesselager	Noble	Ancient nobility from Funen.	1715 by extinction.	Denmark	
	Friis av Holme	Noble	Ancient nobility from Norway. Known from the 15th century with Henrik Erlendsson Friis av Holme.		Norway	
	Friis av Landvik	Noble	1500 Nobility letter for Jacob Friis.	1727 by extinction	Norway	
	Friis from Vadskjærgård	Noble	Ancient nobility from South Jutland. Possibly of the same origin as Friis of Hesselager.	1763 by extinction.	Denmark	
	Friis af Friisenborg	Count	1671 count patent for Mogens Friis as count of Friisenborg.	1763 by extinction.	Denmark	
	Friis av Stokka	Noble	Known from 1500s with Peder Clausen Friis (1545–1614).		Norway	
	Gabel	Noble	1655 Nobility patent for Christoffer Gabel (1617–1673).	1800 by extinction	Norway and Denmark	
	Gagge	Noble	Claus Gagge, fiefholder of Vardøhus 1608-19	1708 by extinction	Denmark and Norway	
	Galle	Noble	Ancient nobility from Norway. Known from 1300s with Åsulv Ketilsson.	1659 by extinction with Kristoffer Galle to Åby and Bækkeskov.	Norway and Denmark	
	Galskyt	Noble	Ancient nobility from Jutland. Came to Norway in the 17th century with Hans Thomassen Galskyt.		Denmark and Norway	
	Galte	Noble	Ancient nobility from Norway. First known man Gaut på Ornes.	1413 by extinction	Norway	
	Galtung	Noble	1648 by recognised noble descent claim for Laurits Johannessøn Galtung.	Alive	Norway	
	Ged	Noble		1538 by extinction.	Denmark	
	Gere	Noble	Ancient nobility from Zealand and Scania. Clara Mostsdatter from Bjørnstorp married admiral Lauritz Galtung in 1647.	1588 by extinction	Denmark and Norway	
	Gerst	Noble	Known 1400s with knight Kolbjørn Arnaldsson Gerst (-1466)		Norway	
	von Gersdorf	Noble	1652 Nobility license colonel Christoph Friedrich von Gersdorff of Malschwitz (ca. 1620–1682), he came to Norway in 1600s.	1955 by extinction	Norway	
	Giedde	Noble	Ancient nobility from Scania. Came to Norway in 1622 with Ove Gjedde.	1848 by extinction with major Ove Unger Rosenkrantz Giedde (-1848).	Denmark and Norway	
	Giedde af Wintersborg	Baron	1742 baron patent for colonel Carl Vilhelm Giedde as baron af Wintersborg. Died without sons.	1757 by extinction	Denmark	
	Gjesling or Elgjarn (Sandbuætten)	Noble	Ancient nobility from Norway. Known from about 1200 with Ivar Gjesling to Sandbu.	1500s by extinction	Norway and Denmark	
	Gjordsen	Noble		1592 by extinction.	Denmark	
	Glad	Noble	1569 nobility patent for Dr. Erasmus Glad; died 1582 without sons.	1582 by extinction	Denmark	
	Glambek (Staverskov, Raale)	Noble	Ancient nobility from Jutland.		Denmark	
	Glambek (of Rutze)	Noble		1591 by extinction.	Denmark	
	von Grambow	Noble	Ancient nobility from Mecklenburg. Came to Norway with Diderik Otto von Grambow (1732–1773).		Norway and Denmark	
	Green (of Rossø)	Noble	Ancient nobility from Norway. 1487 nobility letter for Reer Reersson.	1800s by extinction with Arvid Henrik Green in Gothenburg	Norway and Sweden	
	Green (of Sundsby)	Noble	Ancient nobility from Norway.		Norway and Sweden	
	Grevenkop-Castenskiold	Noble	Nobility patent 1745 for Johan Lorentz Carstens with the name Castenschiold. Branch got danish royal letter 1826 for new name.		Denmark	
	Griis from Sjælland	Noble	Ancient nobility from Zealand. Came to Norway in 1400s with Peder Griis.		Denmark and Norway	
	Grott	Noble	Known 1508 in Norway with squire Daniel Grott to Kjølberg.		Norway	
	Grubbe	Noble	Ancient nobility from Zealand. Known in Norway in 1500s with Palle Sivertsen Grubbe and Ulrik Olsen Grubbe (1705–1784).		Denmark and Norway	
	Grubendal	Noble	Ancient nobility from Lolland. Only one line used the name Grubendal.		Denmark and Norway	
	Grüner	Noble	1693 nobility patent for Johan Diderich Grüner (1661–1712) and Gustav Grüner (1688–1763).	1763 by extinction with general Gustav Grüner to Margård.	Norway	
	Grønn, Grønnow or Abt	Noble	Ancient nobility from Norway. Niels Clausson Grøn or Abt, lagmann in Stavanger 1531. His son Christoffer Nielsson Grøn or Grønnov, lagmann in Stavanger.		Norway	
	Grøn	Noble	Ancient nobility from Jutland.	Lost noble status in 1600s.	Denmark	
	af Gyldenfeldt	Noble	1761 nobility patent for major Christian Schousboe with the name af Gyldenfeldt.	Alive.	Denmark	
	Gyldenhorn	Noble	Ancient nobility form Norway. Known in 1400s with Oluf Torsteinsson to Eline.		Norway	
	Gyldenkrantz	Noble	1783 Nobility patent for Joachim Christian Geelmuyden.	1813 by extinction.	Norway	
	Güldencrone	Baron	1673 baron (friherre) patent for Wilhelm af Marselis with name Güldencrone, baron of Vilhelmsborg.		Denmark	
	Gyldenløve	Noble	Know first in 1400s with Jens Olavsson.	1523 by extinction	Norway	
	Gyldenløve	Noble	Amorial letter for Hans Ulrik Güldenløwe to Vindinge (1616–1645), illegitimate son of Christian IV.	1645 by extinction	Denmark	
	Gyldenløve	Count	1655 by naturalisation letter for illegitimate son of King Frederick III Ulrik Frederik Gyldenløve. His Children was given names titles of baron of Løwendal and count of Danneskiold-Laurvig.		Denmark and Norway	
	Gyldenløve	Count	1679 patents for Christian V. children with Sophie Amalie Moth with name Gyldenløve. Their children became counts and countesses of Samsø, with the name Danneskiold-Samsøe.		Denmark	
	de Gyldenpalm	Noble	1781 Nobility patent for Hans Hagerup.	1832 by extinction.	Norway	
	von Gyldenskiold	Noble	1765 nobility patent for colonel Peter Schønnemann with name von Gyldenskiold.	1809 by extinction with Major General Conrad Christian von Gyldenskiold.	Denmark	
	Gyldensteen	Count	1720 countship created for baron Johan Henrik Huguetan.	1767 by extinction.	Denmark	
	Gyldenstierne	Noble	Ancient nobility from Jutland. One line called them self Bugge and Hak. Known in 1500s with Axel Gyldenstierne.	1729 by extinction with Lieutenant colonel Laurids Ulfeld Gyldenstierne. Still alive in Sweden.	Norway, Denmark and Sweden	
	Güntersberg	Noble	Immigration about 1520 with Heinrich Güntersberg, his line got nobility recognition 1660.		Norway and Denmark	
	Gøye	Noble	Ancient nobility from Lolland. Used and the names Krag and Staverskov.	1698 by extinction with Marcus Gøye.	Denmark	
	Gaas	Noble	Ancient nobility form Denmark. Came to Norway in 1549 with Hans Hanssøn Gaas (-1578), Bishop of Nidaros.	1637 by extinction	Denmark and Norway	
	von Hadelen	Noble	Ancient nobility form Friesland. Came to Norway about 1603 with Lorentz von Hadeln.	1984 by extinction	Denmark and Norway	
	Hak	Noble	Ancient nobility form Scania and Zealand.	1539 extinction with Christoffer Hak to Egholm.	Denmark and Norway	
	Hamilton	Noble	Ancient nobility form Scotland. Came to Norway in 1657 with colonel Robert Hamilton.		Norway	
	Rosensverd	Royal and Noble	Descendants of King Håkon V. Additional Nobility letter in 1458 to Nils Sigurdsson, his brother Sjøfar Sigurdson and all descendants, "each after the other".	Alive.	Norway	
	de Hansen	Noble		1752	Denmark	
	Harboe	Noble	1684 Armorial letter for brothers Jens and colone Andreas Harboe. Both died without sons.	extinction	Norway	
	Harbou	Noble	Ancient nobility from Denmark.	Alive.	Denmark	
	von Hardenberg	Noble	Ancient nobility from Hannover. Known in Norway with Margrethe Corfitzdatter Hardenberg (1540–1610).	1604 extinction with Erik Hardenberg to Vedtofte.	Denmark and Norway	
	Hauch	Noble	1750 nobility patent for magistrate Andreas Niels Hauch.	1824 by extinction	Denmark and Norway	
	Hausmann	Noble	Came to Norway in 1712 with general Caspar Herman Hausmann.	1757 by extinction	Denmark and Norway	
	von Haxthausen	Noble	Ancient nobility from Westphalia. Came to Norway with Friderich Gottschalk von Haxthausen.		Denmark and Norway	
	af Haxthausen	Count	1737 count patent for Chr. Fr. von Haxthausen as count af Haxthausen.	1842 by extinction with count Ove Chr. af Haxthausen.	Denmark	
	Heubsch	Noble	1691 by nobility patent for Jakob Timmermann stepson of Elias Heubsch.	1916 by extinction	Denmark and Norway	
	Hielmstierne	Noble	1747 by letter.	18th century by extinction	Denmark	
	Hjerne	Noble	Ancient nobility from Sweden. Came to Norway in 1300s with knight Jøns Erengislesson Hjerne.		Sweden and Norway	
	Hoff-Rosencrone	Baron	1812 baron patent for Chr. Henrik Hoff with the name Baron af Hoff Rosenkrone.	1900 by extinction	Norway	
	von Hohendorff	Noble	1776 Naturalisation patent for Johan Henrich Albertus von Hohendorphf.		Denmark	
	von Holck	Noble	1810 nobility patent for brothers commander Carl Christian von Holck and colonel Friedrich Carl von Holck.		Norway and Denmark	
	Holck	Noble	Ancient nobility from South Jutland.	Alive.	Denmark	
	af Holck	Count	1676 Naturalisation patent for German counts C. C. and H. D. Holck.	1966 by extinction	Denmark	
	von Holstein	Noble	Ancient nobility from Mecklenburg. Came to Denmark in 1600s.	Alive.	Denmark and Norway	
	Holstein-Holsteinborg	Count	1708 Count patent for Ulrich Adolph von Holstein, baron af Fuirendal.		Denmark	
	Holstein-Ledreborg	Count	1750 count patent for Johan Ludvig Holstein to Ledreborg.		Denmark	
	von Hoven	Noble	Ancient nobility from Livonia. Came to Norway in 1649 with major general Reinhold von Hoven to Vestnes.	1682 by extinction	Norway	
	Huitfeldt	Noble	Ancient nobility from Denmark. Came to Norway in 1400s with Christoffer Huitfeldt (1501–1559).	Alive.	Denmark and Norway	
	Hummer	Noble	1532 nobility letter for Oluf Trulssøn, brothers son of Herman, bishop of Hamar.		Norway	
	Hundermark	Noble	Known in Norway in 1600s with Ellen Clausdatter Hundermark (-1633).	1617 by extinction with Erik Hundermark to Gjerdrup.	Denmark and Norway	
	von Huth	Noble	1776 Naturalisation patent for general Wilhelm von Huth.		Denmark and Norway	
	Hvide	Noble	Ancient nobility from Jutland.		Denmark	
	von Hübsch	Noble	1691 nobility patent for Elias von Hübsch (-1703).		Norway	
	Høeg	Noble	Came to Norway in 1682 with Just Høeg (1640–1694).	1865 by extinction in Denmark. A line still lives in Germany.	Denmark and Norway	
	Hørby	Noble	1560 Armorial letter for Pros Lauridsen.		Norway	
	Juel	Noble	Ancient nobility from Denmark. Came to Norway in 1618 with Jens Hermansson Juel (1580–1634).		Denmark and Norway	
	Juel-Vind af Juellinge	Baron	1708 baron patent for Jens Juel-Vind. Uses the name Krag-Juel-Vind-Frijs.	Alive.	Denmark	
	Juul	Noble	Ancient nobility from Denmark. Came to Norway in 1676 with Ove Juul (1615–1686).	1907 by extinction	Denmark and Norway	
	Juul-Rysensteen	Baron	1679 Baron (Friherre) patent for Chr. Juul, son in law of Henrik Ruse baron of Rusenstein.	1960 by extinction	Denmark	
	Kalips	Noble	1550 Nobility letter for Oluf Kalips.		Norway	
	Kane	Noble	Ancient nobility from Norway. First known with squire Gunnar Toraldesson Kane.	1496 extinction with Squire Arild Ottesson Kane.	Norway	
	von Kauffmann	Noble	Ancient nobility from Schwaz in Tyrol. Came to Norway with Conrad Kauffmann 1685.		Norway and Denmark	
	von Kløcker	Noble	1760 Naturalisation patent for H. L. von Kløcker and for brothers of Johannes von Kløcker.		Denmark and Norway	
	Knagenhjelm	Noble	1721 nobility patent for Niels Tygesen Knag.	Alive.	Norway	
	Knoff	Noble	Nobility from Prussia. Came to Norway with Daniel Knoff (1614–1687).		Norway	
	Knuth	Noble	Ancient nobility from Mecklenburg. Came to Denmark in 1600s with brothers Adam Levin von Knuth and Eggert Chr. von Knuth.		Denmark	
	Knuth-Christiandsdal	Baron	1742 baron (Lensbaron) patent for baron Christian Frederik Knuth as baron of Christiansdal.		Denmark	
	Knuth-Knuthenborg	Count	1714 count patent for Adam Christopher Knuth as count of Knuthenborg.		Denmark	
	Kold	Noble	Ancient nobility from Norway. Known 1489 with Tore Kold.		Norway	
	Kolderup-Rosenvinge	Noble	1811 by nobility patent for P. A. Rosenvinge Kolderup.	1939 by extinction	Norway	
	Krabbe of Bustrup & Østergård	Noble	Came to Norway with Iver Krabbe.		Denmark and Norway	
	Krabbe of Damsgård	Noble	Came to Norway with Lieutenant Colonel Frederik Christian Krabbe (1713–1776).		Denmark and Norway	
	Krabbe in Bohuslen	Noble			Norway and Denmark	
	Krabbe from Oslo	Noble	Jesse Krabbe (known 1408).		Norway	
	Krabbe from Ribe	Noble	Came to Norway with Nils Krabbe (-1581), fifeholder of Gile.	1581 by extinction	Norway	
	Krabbe from Tønsberg	Noble	Jon Staffanson Krabbe (-1465).		Norway and Iceland	
	Krag	Baron	Ancient nobility from Jutland. 1684 Baron patent for Fr. Krag. Came to Norway in 1713 with baron Frederik Krag.	1763 by extinction with Frederik Chr. Krag.	Denmark and Norway	
	Krognos	Noble	Ancient nobility form Scania.	1573 by extinction.	Sweden and Denmark	
	Kruckow	Noble	Ancient nobility from Funen. Known 1526 in Norway with Finn Nilsson to Rostvik.	1621 by extinction with Ejler Kruckow to Årslevgård.	Denmark and Norway	
	Kruckow	Noble	Ancient nobility possibly from Pomerania. Known in 1400s in Norway with Hans Kruckow.	1601 by extinction.	Norway	
	Krummedike	Noble	Ancient nobility from Holstein. Came to Norway with Hartvig Krummedige.	1598 by extinction.	Denmark and Norway	
	Kruse	Noble	Ancient nobility from Jutland. Known first in Norway with Christian Kruse (1636–1699)	1766 by extinction with captain Henrik Ryge Kruse.	Denmark and Norway	
	von Krøpelin	Noble	Ancient nobility from Mecklenburg. Known 1400s in Norway with Hans Krøpelin.		Norway	
	von der Kuhla	Noble			Denmark	
	Kaas	Noble	Ancient nobility from Denmark. Came to Norway with Oberst Jørgen Kaas to Hastrup & Østergård (1618–1658).	1799 by extinction	Denmark and Norway	
	Kaas or Munthe-Kaas	Noble	Ancient nobility from Denmark. Came to Norway in 1600s with colonel Jørgen Kaas to Hastrup and Østergård.	Alive.	Denmark and Norway	
	Kaas-Lehn	Baron	1804 baron (friherre) patent for Otto Detlev Kaas as baron Kaas-Lehn.		Denmark	
	von Landsberg	Noble	Ancient nobility from Westphalia. Came to Norway in 1687 form Holstein with Lieutenant Colonel Barthold Nicolay von Landsberg (1668–1740).	1740 by extinction in Norway.	Norway	
	Lange	Noble	Came to Norway with Frederik Lange (-1612).		Denmark and Norway	
	von Lange	Noble	Came to Norway with Petter von Lange.		Norway	
	Laxmand	Noble	Ancient nobility known since 1315,	1642 by extinciton.	Denmark	
	de Leth	Noble	1708 nobility patent for Niels Leth to Nørre Vosborg.		Norway and Denmark	
	Leth	Noble	1757 nobility patent for colonel Mathias Leth.	Alive as Steensen-Leth.	Denmark	
	von Levetzau	Noble	Ancient nobility from Mecklenburg. Came to Norway with Albrecht Philip von Levetzau (1744–1817).		Denmark and Norway	
	af Levetzau	Count	1751 Count (lensgreve) patent for Christian Frederik von Levetzau.		Denmark	
	Lillienschiold	Noble	1676 by nobility letter for Hans Hanssøn Schmidt.	1748 by extinction	Norway	
	Limbek	Noble	Ancient nobility from Denmark.	1562 by extinction	Denmark	
	Lindenov	Noble	Came to Norway with admiral Christoffer Godskesen Lindenov.	1738 by extinction	Denmark and Norway	
	Litle	Noble	Ancient nobility from Denmark. Came to Norway before 1520 with Peder Hanssøn Litle. Also used names Hvide, Galen, Hak, Stygge and Erlandsen.		Denmark and Norway	
	Lorck	Noble	Came to Norway with Otto Jacobsen Lorck (-1660).		Denmark and Norway	
	Losna	Noble	Ancient nobility first known in Sogn with Filippus Erlendsson til Odensland. His son Erlend Filippusson to Losna (died 1407).	1400s by extinction	Norway	
	von Lowzow	Noble	1777 naturalisation letter for Ehlert Detleff von Lowzow. Came to Norway with major Christof Friderich von Lowzow.		Denmark and Norway	
	Lund (from Als and Sundeved)	Noble			Denmark and Norway	
	Lunge	Noble	Ancient nobility from Denmark. Came to Norway with Vincens Lunge.	1707 by extinction	Denmark and Norway	
	von Lüneberg	Noble	Came to Norway with lieutenant colonel Hans Jacob von Lüneberg.		Norway	
	Lykke (Munk)	Noble	Came to Norway with Niels Jachimsson Lykke.	1699 by extinction	Denmark and Norway	
	Lystrup	Noble	1549 nobility letter for Nils Lauritsson Liudstrup.		Norway	
	Lystrup av Vestrheim	Noble	Schack Christenson Lystrup (1574 - 1644).		Norway	
	von Lützow	Noble	Ancient nobility from Mecklenburg. 1651 by letter for Hugo von Lützow. Came to Norway with Lieutenant general Barthold Heinrich von Lützow (1654–1729).	1963 by extinction	Denmark and Norway	
	Løvenbalk	Noble	Ancient nobility from Jutland. First ancestor Erik Christoffersøn is sad to be the extramarital son King Christoffer II with virgin form the old Lunge family.		Denmark and Norway	
	Løvendal	Baron	1682 Baron patent for Woldemar and Carl Løvendal, sons of Ulrik Fr. Gyldenløve, and their mother Margarethe Pape. Came to Norway with general baron Woldemar Løvendal.	1829 by extinction with count Carl Woldemar Danneskiold-Løvendal.	Denmark and Norway	
	von Løvencrone	Noble	1674 nobility patent for Claus Beenfeldt with name Løwencrone. He died without sons in 1676.	1676 by extinction	Denmark	
	von Løvenhielm	Noble	1669 by nobility letter for Colonel Hans Schrøder (1627–1699).	1699 by extinction	Denmark	
	Løvenskiold	Noble	1739 nobility patent for Herman Leopoldus (1677–1750).	Alive.	Norway and Denmark	
	von Løvenskiold	Baron	1773 friherre patent for Severin Løvenskiold to Løvenborg.	Alive.	Denmark	
	de Løvenstierne	Noble	1756 by letter for Engelke Godefroid Riis.	1772 by extinction	Denmark	
	de Løvenørn	Noble	1711 nobility patent for Poul Vendelbo (1686–1740).	1922 by extinction	Denmark	
	Løwenklau	Noble	1641 by letter	???? by extinction	Denmark	
	von der Maase	Noble	1712 nobility patent for children of Hector Gottfried Masius.		Denmark	
	von und zu Mansbach	Noble	Came to Norway with Lieutenant general Johann Friedrich von und zu Mansbach (1744–1803).		Norway	
	Marsvin	Noble	Ancient nobility from Denmark.		Denmark	
	Markdanner	Noble	Caspar Markdanner, fiefholder of Senja 1580-91 and Brunlaug & Nummedal 1616-18	1618 by extinction	Denmark and Norway	
	von Marschalck	Noble	1652 Naturalisation patent. Came to Norway with Johan Frederik von Marschalck, to Hutloh, Evje & Sande.		Denmark and Norway	
	von Medschede	Noble	Schweder von Medschede		Norway	
	Michelet	Noble	Came to Norway with major Paul Michelet (ca. 1617–1660) and captein Jacques Michelet (ca. 1619–ca. 1678).		Norway	
	von Molteke	Noble	Hermann Molteke til Tomb (known 1413–65)		Denmark and Norway	
	von Munthe af Morgenstierne	Noble	1755 by letter for Bredo Munthe til Bekkeskov.	Alive.	Norway	
	Motzfeldt	Noble	1730 ennobled by rank with Peter Nicolay Motzfeldt.		Norway	
	Mowat	Noble	Came to Norway with Anders Mowat til Hovland.		Norway	
	Mule	Noble	Came to Norway in 1516 with Lykke Mule.		Norway	
	Mumme	Noble	Came to Norway with Gjert Gjertsen Mumme.		Denmark and Norway	
	Mund	Noble	Came to Norway with Niels Mund (known 1596).	1915	Denmark and Norway	
	Munk	Noble	Known in Norway with Christiern Munk (known 1552).		Norway	
	Munk	Noble	Known in Norway with Erik Nilsson Munk (known 1578 to Barbo).		Norway	
	Munk from Halland	Noble	To this family belonged admiral Erik Munk (-1594), his son the discoverer Jens Munk (1579–1628). The family stil lived in 18th century in Bergen.		Denmark and Norway	
	Munk (Lange)	Count and Noble	Known in Norway with Christen Munk (ca. 1520–1579) and count Ludvig Ludvigsson Munk (1537–1602).		Denmark and Norway	
	Munk	Noble	Ancient nobility from Jutland. First known ancestor was Peder Munk (known 1333). Other lines use the name Mus and Due.	1747 by extinction.	Denmark and Norway	
	Munk of Korstrup	Noble	Ancient nobility from Jutland.	1500s extinction with Bertel Munk.	Denmark and Norway	
	Munk (Blakarætten)	Noble	Known first in Norway with squire Benkt Nikolasson (known 1378, 1388).		Norway	
	Mus	Noble	Known in Norway with squire Niels Mus (known 1460).		Denmark and Norway	
	Munthe-Kaas	Noble	Ancient nobility from Denmark. Came to Norway in the 18th century with lieutenant colonel Hartvig Kaas to Ulstrup (1635–1704).	Alive.	Denmark and Norway	
	Måneskjold	Noble	Ancient nobility from Bohuslän/Halland.	1742 by extinction	Norway and Sweden	
	Månestjerne	Noble	Known first in Norway with Staffan Clausson.	About 1440 by extinction	Norway	
	de Neergaard	Noble	1788 nobility patent for brothers Jens Bruun Neergaard (1742–1788) and Johan Thomas Neergaard (1745–1806).		Denmark	
	von Nettelhorst	Noble	Nobility of Livonia. Came to Norway in 1609 with Gerlof von Nettelhorst.		Norway	
	von Nissen	Noble	1710 nobility patent for Herman Lorentz Nissen.	1763 extinction with Chr. Sigfred Nissen-Benzon to Skjærsø.	Denmark	
	Norbagge	Noble	1488 nobility letter for Eggert Eggetsson. 1551 Confirmation letter for Eggert Hansson.		Norway and Iceland	
	Normand de la Navité	Noble	Nobility from France. Came to Norway in 1579 with Thomas Normand de la Navité.	1645 by extinction	Norway	
	von Normann	Noble	1776 Naturalisation patent Adolph Christoph Adam von Normann.		Denmark	
	Norweger	Noble	Known in Norway in 1400s with Tarald father of Gaute Taraldsson Norweger.	After 1557 by extinction	Norway	
	Numsen	Noble	1688 Armorial letter for Mathias Numsen.		Denmark	
	Orm	Noble			Norway	
	Orning	Noble	Ancient nobility Jutland. Came to Norway with Thomas Svendsen to Elingård.	1786 line extinct in Norway. Alive in Denmark.	Denmark and Norway	
	Oxe	Noble	Ancient nobility from Franconia.	1577 with Albert Oxe to Nielstrup	Denmark	
	von Parsberg	Noble	Ancient nobility from Bavaria. Christoffer Parsberg came with King Christoffer of Bavaria about 1440. Known first in Norway with knight Oluf Parsberg to Jernit & Palstrup.	1730 extinction with Johan Parsberg to Eskjær.	Denmark and Norway	
	von Paslick	Noble	Ancient nobility from Pomerania. Came to Norway with captain lieutenant Knud Frederiksen Paslick (-1670).	1730 by extinction	Denmark and Norway	
	von Petersdorff	Count	1810 count patent for Christian Alexander von Petersdorff.	1945 by extinction.	Denmark	
	Porse	Duke	Knut Porse duke of Halland and Samsø (d. 1330) married Ingeborg Håkonsdatter of Norway.		Denmark	
	Rabe von Papenheim	Noble	Nobility from Westphalia. Came to Norway in 1604 with Alexander Rabe von Papenheim (-1631).		Denmark and Norway	
	von Raben	Noble	Ancient nobility from Mecklenburg. Came to Denmark in 1600s.		Denmark	
	Raben	Count	1734 count patent for Chr. Raben as count of Christiansholm, he died without sons in 1750. And in 1760 his brother O. L. Raben, this line died out 1879.		Denmark	
	von Rantzau	Count	1671 counte patent for Otto Rantzau. His son count Christian Rantzau was Governor-general of Norway.		Denmark and Norway	
	von Rappe	Noble	1797 Naturalisation patent. Came to Norway in 1788.		Denmark and Norway	
	Rask	Noble	Know first in 1502 with squire Jens Rask, mayor in Marstrand.		Norway	
	Rathlou	Noble	Ancient nobility from Holstein.	1752 by extinction with Chr. Rathlou to Rathlousdal.	Denmark	
	Reedtz	Noble	Ancient nobility from Pomernia. Came to Denmark in 1572 with Peder Reedtz.		Denmark	
	Reedtz-Thott	Baron	1805 baron (friherre) patent for Otto Reedtz-Thott.		Denmark	
	von Rehbinder	Noble	Came to Norway in 1700s with major Fredrik Christian Rehbinder.		Norway	
	von Reichau	Noble	Nobility from Saxony. Came to Norway in 1733 with lieutenant general Christian Frederik von Reichau to Aker (1686–1753).		Norway	
	von Reichwein	Noble	1628 by rank for generalmajor Georg von Reichwein. 1655 Nobility letter for Jørgen Reichwein.	1864 by extinction.	Denmark and Norway	
	Rempe	Noble	Came to Norway with Finn Rempe (known 1524).		Denmark and Norway	
	Rev	Noble	Ancient nobility form Denmark. Came to Norway in 1500s with Hans Rev (-1545).		Denmark and Norway	
	Revenfeldt	Noble	1695 for count Conrad Reventlow's illegitimate sons Detlev, Conrad and Conradine with name Revenfeld.		Denmark	
	von Reventlow	Noble	Ancient Danish nobility from Dithmarschen.		Denmark	
	af Reventlow	Count	1673 count patent for Conrad Reventlow.		Denmark	
	af Reventlow	Count	1767 count patent for Ditlev Reventlow of Altenhof.		Denmark	
	von Rhäder later Ræder	Noble	1683 by rank for Johan Georg von Rhäder.		Norway	
	Roed	Noble	Came to Norway in 1500s with Tord Roed (also written Rodt or Rod).		Denmark and Norway	
	de Roepstorff	Noble	1701 Naturalisation for lieutenant colonel Johan Christoph de Roepstorff. Came to Norway with major general Carl Ludvig de Roepstorf (1701–1787).	1865 by extinction	Denmark and Norway	
	de Roklenge	Noble	Ancient nobility from Courland. 1666 Naturalisation letter for brothers major Martin Jørgen de Rochlenge and Werner Jakob de Roklenge.	1748 line extinction	Norway	
	"Rose" of Suðrheim	Noble	Ancient nobility from Romeriket.	Alive in Sweden.	Norway and Sweden	
	Rosencreutz	Noble	1686 Amorial letter for Hans Hansen (1622–1708) with the name Rosencreutz.	1708 by extinction	Norway	
	Londeman af Rosencrone	Noble	1749 nobility patent for bishop Edvard Londemann to Rosendal with name Londeman af Rosencrone.	1811 by extinction	Norway	
	af Rosencrone	Baron	1773 baron patent for Marcus Gerhard Londemann af Rosencrone.	1811 by extinction	Denmark and Iceland	
	af Rosencrone	Count	1783 count patent for baron Marcus Gerhard Londemann af Rosencrone.	1811 by extinction	Denmark and Iceland	
	Rosengiedde or Giedde	Noble	1536 nobility later for Laurits Nilsson.	Extinction with Arild Axelsen Giedde last known 1673	Norway	
	Rosenheim	Noble	1676 nobility paten for Jens Nielsen Toller in Bergen with the name Rosenheim.	1700 with son Chr. Ulrik Rosenheim.	Norway	
	Rosenkrantz	Noble	Came to Norway with Otte Holgersen Rosenkrantz.		Denmark and Norway	
	Rosenvinge	Noble	1505 by nobility letter for Mogens Jensen Skriver (-1528). His descendants took the name Rosenvinge. And later the family got four nobility renewal letters.		Norway and Denmark	
	Rosing	Noble	1693 by rank for bishop Hans Rosing.		Norway	
	von Rummelhoff	Noble	Came to Norway in 1710 major Heinrich Johan Rummelhoff.		Norway	
	Rømer or Reymare	Noble	Known in the mid 1300s with Otte Rømer.	Extinction before 1435.	Norway	
	"Rømer"	Noble	Ancient nobility from Sweden. Came to Norway with Jakob Fastulvsson.	1530 by extinction.	Sweden and Norway	
	le Sage de Fontenay	Noble	1778 naturalisation patent for captin Robert Antoine le Sage de Fontenay.		Denmark	
	Saxtrup	Noble	Ancient nobility from Scania. Known since 1337.	1595 by extinction.	Denmark	
	af Scheel	Count	1752 count patent for Christian Scheel to Estrup.		Denmark	
	von Schlanbusch	Noble	Came to Norway in 1685 with Heinrich von Schlanbusch (1640–1705).		Norway	
	von Schimmelmann	Noble	1780 nobility patent for colonel H. L. E. von Schimmelmann.		Denmark	
	Schimmelmann	Baron	1762 friherre patent for Heinrich Carl Schimmelmann as baron af Lindenborg.		Denmark	
	Schimmelmann	Count	1779 count patent for Heinrich Carl von Schimmelmann		Denmark	
	Schimmelmann	Noble	1804 nobility grant for Louise Wesselhof with name Schimmelmann, adopted daughter of count Ernst Heinrich af Schimmelmann.		Denmark	
	Schinkel	Noble	Came to Norway in 17th century with Knud Povelsen Schinkel to Tomb (-1669).		Denmark and Norway	
	von Schmettow	Count	1776 by naturalisation letter for major general count Carl Jacob Waldemar von Schmettow (1719–1785).		Denmark and Norway	
	von Schnitler	Noble	Came to Norway in 1717 with lieutenant colonel Peter Lorenzen von Schnitler.		Norway	
	de Schouboe	Noble	1747 Nobility patent Oluf Broch Schouboe.	1892 by extinction	Norway	
	Schult	Noble	1642 nobility recognition? Came to Norway in 18th century with Claus Lauritzen Schult?.		Norway	
	Schønnebølle	Noble	Came to Norway in 1500s with Erik Hanssøn Schønnebøl (1535–1595).	1783 extinction with commander Hans Schønnebølle.	Denmark and Norway	
	von Schørt	Noble	Came to Norway in 1684 with oberberghauptmann and major general Hans Brostrup von Schört (ca 1630–1703).		Norway	
	Seefeld	Noble	Ancient nobility from Jutland.		Denmark	
	Sehested	Noble	Came to Norway with Hannibal Sehested, nobility patent 1662. And his Brother Malte Sehested.		Denmark and Norway	
	Selby	Baron	1796 baron patent for Charles Selby.	1849	Denmark	DAA 1888
	Sibbern	Noble	Ennobled by rank in 1730 with major general Carsten Sibbern (1691–1771).		Norway	
	Sinclair	Earls and Nobles	Ancient Scottish nobility that presumably is of Scandinavian origin. 1379 did Henry Sinclair (-ca. 1400) inherited the Earldom of Orkney, and swore fealty to King Håkon VI. Anders Sinklar is also known in Denmark 1591 and 1674. Known in Norway also with bailiff of Buskerud, David Sinclair. Another line came in 1600s to Sweden.		Norway, Denmark and Sweden	
	Skak	Noble	1504 nobility letter for Nils Tormodsson.	1586 last known with Jon Nilsson to Hægstad.	Norway	
	Skanke	Noble	Ancient nobility from Norway. Widely branched nobility presumably for Jämtland. Knight Olav Nilsson (ca. 1400–1455) to Talgje.		Norway	
	Skeel	Noble	Ancient nobility from Denmark.		Denmark	
	Skjolderband	Noble	Ancient nobility from Ryfylke. Jens Pedersson to Bru known 1560–1585.		Norway	
	Smør	Noble	Ancient nobility from Norway. Known in 1300s with knight Jon Ragnvaldsson Smør (ca. 1240-før 1328).	1483 extinction with steward Jon Svalesson Smør (ca. 1420–1483)	Norway	
	Smør	Noble	Ancient nobility from Norway. Known in 1400s with Kjell Trondsson Smør (-1532).		Norway	
	Soop	Noble			Norway	
	Splid or Fasti	Noble	Ancient nobility from Jutland. Possibly the same origin as Skram and Bryning. Know in Norway in 16th century with squire Jens Palleson Splid.	1628 extinction with Palle Splid Fasti to Mindstrup.	Denmark and Norway	
	von Staffeldt	Noble	1776 naturalisation patent for lieutenant general Bernhard Ditlef von Staffeldt. He came to Norway in 1787.	1896 by extinction.	Denmark and Norway	
	Stampe	Noble	Nobility letter 1480 for Jep Nilsson. 1759 nobility renewal for Henrik Stampe (-1789).	1789 by extinction?	Norway and Denmark	
	Staur	Noble	Nobility letter 1527 for Jørgen Pedersson.	1600s extinction with second lieutenant Peder Jørgensson Staur.	Norway	
	von Stemann	Noble	1777 and 1782 nobility patent for brothers Chr. L., Fr. H. and E. J. P. Stemann.	1961 by extinction.	Denmark	
	Stjerne of Suðrheim	Noble	Ancient nobility from Sweden. Came in 1300s to Norway with knight Jon Marteinsson.	Extinction with Eskil Lagesson died after 1475.	Sweden and Norway	
	Stjerne of Kaupanger	Noble	Ancient nobility from Norway. Known in 1500s with Christoffer Andersson to Kaupanger, died after 1565.		Norway	
	Stjerne of Hanevoll	Noble	Ancient nobility from Norway. Known in 1500s with Kjell Lauritsson to Hanevoll.		Norway	
	de Stockfleth	Noble	1779 nobility patent for Thomas Rosing de Stockfleth, captin Christopher Stockfleth and viceadmiral William Walker Stockfleth.		Denmark and Norway	
	von Storm	Noble	Ennobled by rank in 1670 with lieutenant colonel Balthasar Storm.		Norway	
	Suhm	Noble	1683 Nobility patent for Henrik Suhm (1636–1700).	1798 by extinction	Norway	
	Sundt	Noble	1733 Nobility patent for lieutenant general Michael Sundt to Evjegård (1679–1753).	1984 by extinction	Norway	
	Svale	Noble	Known in the 16th century with Christoffer Svale (known 1562).		Norway	
	Svanenhielm	Noble	1720 nobility patent for Severin Seehusen.	1726 by extinction	Norway	
	de Svanenskiold	Noble	1780 Nobility patent for Niels Jørgensen to Svanholm with the name de Svanenskiold.	Alive.	Denmark	
	Svarteskåning	Noble	1400s came to Norway with Swedish knight Jøns Nilsson Svarteskåning.		Denmark, Sweden and Norway	
	Tancke	Noble	1683 nobility confirmation for Martin Tancke.		Denmark	
	Teiste	Noble	Ancient nobility from Norway.		Norway	
	de Thygeson	Noble	1776 nobility patent for Thyge Jesper og Lars Thygesen with the de Thygeson. Known in Norway with Nicolai Emanuel de Thygeson.		Denmark and Norway	
	von Todderud	Noble	Ennobled by rank in 1760 with major general Peder Gulbrandsen von Todderud.	1865 by extinction	Norway	
	de Tonsberg	Noble	Ennobled by rank 1684 with Mathias de Tonsberg to Ulveland.	1770 by extinction	Norway	
	Tordenskiold	Noble	1716 nobility patent for captin Peter Wessel. And in 1761 nobility patent for his nephew captin Johan Christoph Wessel with same name and coat of arms.	1828 extinction with Johan Chr. Tordenskiold.	Norway	
	Tordenstjerne	Noble	1505 nobility letter for Nils Svendsson (-1596) to Solum and Gullaug. 1734 confirmation patent for Nils Oudensson Tordenstjerne to Søndre Gullaug.	1771 extinction with Ouden Nilsson Tordenstierne.	Norway	
	von Trampe	Count	Ancient nobility from Pomerania. 1743 naturalisation patent for major general Philip Detlev Trampe as count.	Alive.	Denmark and Norway	
	Tre Roser	Noble	Ancient nobility from Sweden. Came in 1400s to Norway with Alv Knutsson of Suðrheim.		Sweden and Norway	
	Treschow	Noble	1812 nobility patent for Michael Treschow. Came to Norway with Willum Frederik Treschow.	Alive.	Norway, Denmark and Sweden	
	von Tritzschler	Noble	Nobility from Saxony. Came to Norway in 17th century with lieutenant general Hans Ernst von Tritzschler (1647–1718) to Tomb.		Norway	
	Trolle	Noble	Known in Norway with Niels Trolle.		Denmark and Norway	
	Trolle af Brahetrolleborg	Count	1689 baron patent for Frederik Trolle as baron of Brahetrolleborg. Died without sons.	1700 by extinction.	Denmark	
	Ulfeldt	Noble	Ancient nobility from Denmark. Came to Norway in 17th century with Knud Ulfeldt.	1769 extinction with riksgreve Anton Corfitz Ulfeldt (1699–1769)	Denmark and Norway	
	Ulfeldt	Noble	Came to Norway with Trud Gregersson.	1634 by extinction.	Denmark and Norway	
	Ulfeldt	Count (Rigsgreve)	1635 count patent for colonel Franciscus Ulfeld.	1636 by extinction	Denmark	
	Ulfeldt	Count (Rigsgreve)	1641 count patent for Corfitz Ulfeld.	1769 by extinction	Denmark	
	de Ulricsdal	Noble	1728 Nobility patent for illegitimate son of count Ulrik Gyldenløve; lieutenant general Wilhelm Ulricsdal. He came to Norway in 1720.		Denmark and Norway	
	Vagel de Ulrichsdal	Noble	1782 Nobility patent for Wilhelm Ulricsdal's daughter son Christian Wilhelm Vagel de Ulrichsdal (1749–1790).	1883 by extinction	Denmark and Norway	
	Urne	Noble	Ancient nobility from Denmark. Came to Norway in 17th century with Knud Urne.	Norwegian line extinct in 1728.	Denmark and Norway	
	Urup or Ugerup	Noble	Ancient nobility from Denmark. Came to Norway in 16th century with Erik Urup (known 1547–1561) and Henrik Ugerup (-1581).	1671 by extinction	Denmark and Norway	
	Walkendorf	Noble	Came to Norway in 16th century with archbishop Erik Axelsson Valkendorf (ca. 1465–1522) and Erik Walkendorf (-1608).	1747 by extinction	Denmark and Norway	
	Wedel-Jarlsberg	Count	1776 naturalisation patent and 1684 countship patent for field marshal baron Gustav Wilhelm von Wedel.	Alive.	Norway	
	Wedell-Wedellsborg	Count	1672 count patent for baron Vilhelm Fr. Wedell		Denmark	
	Vedderhorn	Noble	Known in Norway in 17th century with Poul Jonssen Vedderhorn.		Norway and Sweden	
	Werenskiold	Noble	1697 Nobility patent for Niels Wernerson. And in 1717 for his brothers Jens and Christian Wernerson.	Alive.	Norway and Denmark	
	von Wessel	Noble	1720 Nobility patent for Caspar Wessel.	Alive?	Norway	
	von Weisburg	Noble	1671 Nobility patent for colonel Eilerich von Weisburg (Wiborg or Viborg).		Norway	
	von Westervick	Noble	1675 Nobility patent for chamberlain Joachim Irgens (1611–1675) to Gjorselv and Vestervig.	1698 by extinction with Gerhard Irgens von Westervig	Denmark and Norway	
	de Vibe or Wibe	Noble	1634 Nobility patent for Peder Wibe.		Norway	
	Vibe	Noble	1671 Nobility patent for Johan Vibe.		Norway	
	Vibe	Noble	1671 Nobility patent for Michael Wibe.	1731	Norway	
	Wichfeld	Noble	1777 nobility patent for brothers Jørgen Wichmand and Thomas Frederik Wichmand with the name Wichfeld.		Denmark	
	Widekjær	Noble	Known in 16th century with Samson Engelbretsson til Finne (known 1591).		Norway	
	von Vieregg	Noble	Ancient nobility from Mecklenburg. Known in Norway with Claus Henrik Vieregg (1655–1713). 1776 naturalisation patent for Frederik Ludvig von Vieregge (-1805).		Denmark and Norway	
	Viffert	Noble		1601 by extinction	Denmark and Norway	
	Wincke	Noble	Came to Norway in 16th century with Hans Andersen Wincke (about 1595–1625).		Denmark and Norway	
	Vind	Noble	Ancient nobility from Denmark. Came to Norway in 16th century with Iver Vind.		Denmark and Norway	
	af Winterfeldt	Baron	1671 baron patent for Helmuth Otto af Winterfeld.	1739	Denmark	
	Wormskiold	Noble	1757 nobility patent for Henrik Chr. Worm with name Wormskiold.	1845 extinction with Morten Wormskiold.	Denmark	
	af Zanniboni	Count	1701 count patent for Bartholomæus Zanniboni.	1822 by extinction.	Denmark	
	von Zernichow	Baron	Known in Denmark and Norway in the 17th century with colonel Christian Diderich friherre von Czernichow and his son major Ernst Friedrich friherre von Zernichow (1640–1711).		Denmark and Norway	
	von Zepelin	Noble	Ancient nobility from Mecklenburg. 1806 naturalisation patent for captin C. C. F. von Zepelin.		Denmark	
	von Zytphen	Noble	1757 nobility patent for Chr. Fr. von Zytphen, died without sons 1804, and in 1838 patent for G. F. O. Zytphen.		Denmark	

== Noble titles ==
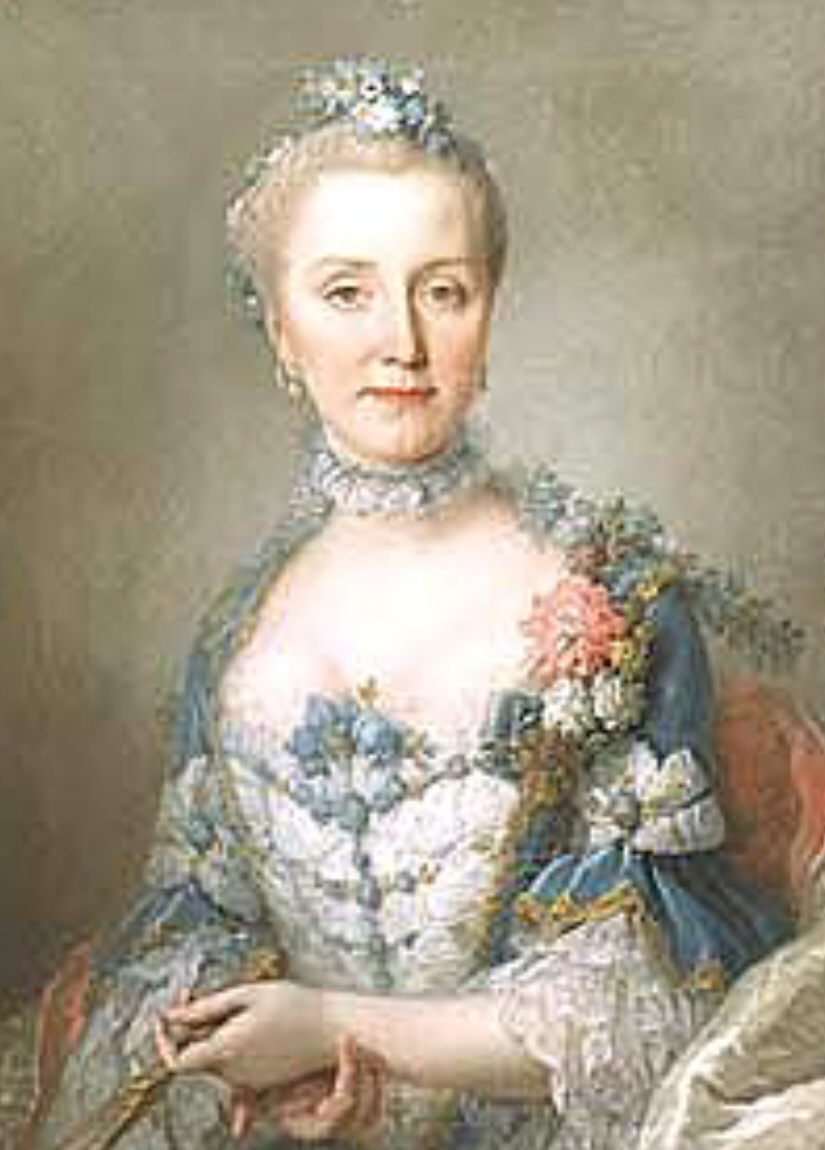
Caroline von Schimmelmann, Countess to Lindenborg, née Tugendreich Friedeborn.

Coat of arms of the Sinclair Earls of Orkney. Artist: Commons user Jimmy44

Several different sets of titles have existed, and also the function and the content of titles have varied. There are considerable differences between medieval titles and modern ones.

Dano-Norwegian titles are different from the British concept of peerage. Whilst a peerage is inherited upon the holder's death and normally by the eldest son only, a Dano-Norwegian title was normally received by all legitimate sons and daughters at the moment of their birth, meaning that there could be several countesses or barons of the same family at the same time. The exception was the title of count (greve for men and grevinne for women), which in general was restricted to the bearer, his wife, and his eldest son.

One has to distinguish between titles and fiefs. For example, the (administrative) fief Countship of Jarlsberg was dissolved in 1821, but the recognition of the title Count of Jarlsberg was not abolished until 1893, and the (physical) estate of Jarlsberg is still in the family's possession.

Whilst a fief in Norway was limited to Norway, the title was also Danish. Likewise a fief-based title in Denmark was also Norwegian. In other words, titles were dual. For example, there were/are a Norwegian fief Countship of Jarlsberg, a Norwegian title Count of Jarlsberg (no longer officially recognised), and a Danish title Count of Jarlsberg (still officially recognised).

The 1821 Nobility Law initiated a long-range abolition of official recognition of noble titles (not of titles per se).

=== Ancient aristocratic titles ===
Title	English	Information
jarl	earl	A regional chieftain, especially as a ruler under the king.
herse		A local chieftain.
sysselmann		An administrator of a syssel. Introduced in the late 12th century; displaced 'lendmann' and 'årmann'.
lendmann		A regional administrator under the king. He was usually a member of the aristocracy.
årmann		A local administrator under the king. He was usually of non-aristocratic origin.
huskarl	housecarl	Élite infantry.
hauld	hold	Farmer whose family had possessed a farm for six generations or more. The highest rank of free men.

- Note: This list may not express accurate rank between the titles.

=== Medieval aristocratic titles (1st system) ===
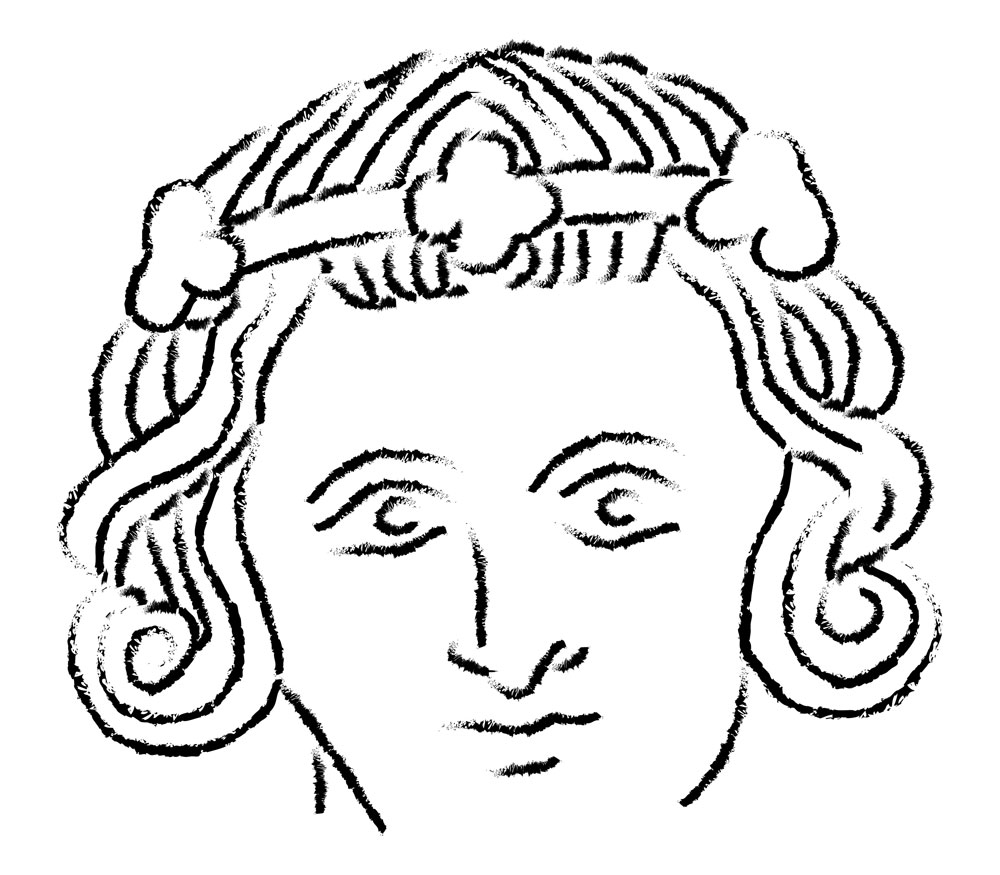
A drawing based on a historical relief of Skule Bårdsson, Duke of Norway, who was a claimant to the throne. This title had a tactical function, being used mainly by heirs. Artist: Commons user FinnWikiNo

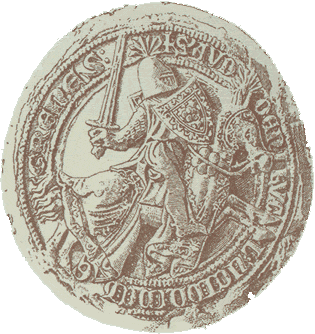
Seal of Baron Audun Hugleiksson.

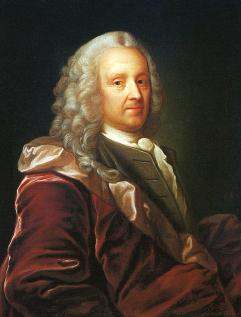
Ludvig Holberg, Baron to Holberg. Painter: Jørgen Røed

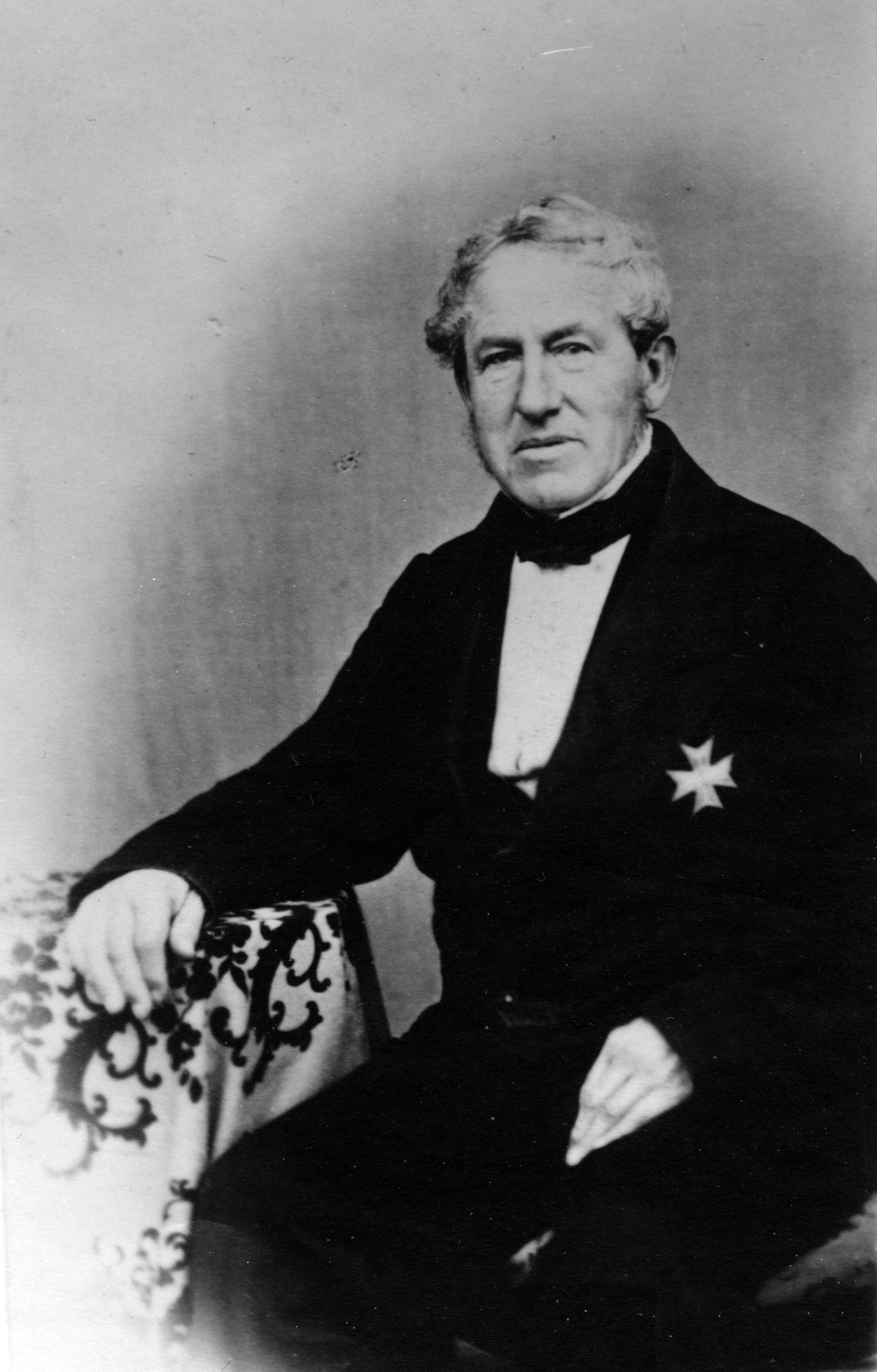
Adam Johan Frederik Poulsen Trampe, Count of Trampe. Photographer: unknown

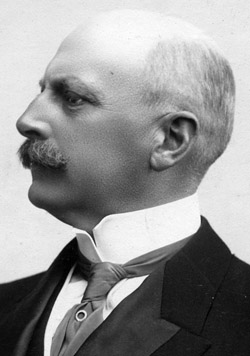
Fritz Wedel Jarlsberg, Baron of Jarlsberg.

Title	Rank	English	Information
hertug		duke	Introduced in 1237. Not in use after 1299, when Duke Håkon Magnusson became king.
jarl		earl	The last earl in mainland Norway was appointed in 1295 and died in 1309.
hirdmann	1st: lendmann		'Lendmann' was replaced by 'baron' in 1277, which itself was abolished in 1308.
	2nd: skutilsvein		'Skutilsvein' was replaced with 'ridder' in 1277.
	3rd: hirdmann		Later abolished.
gjest			Later abolished.
kjertesvein			Later abolished.

Duke In 1237 Earl Skule Bårdsson was given the title and the rank of duke (Norwegian: hertug). It was the first time this title had been used in Norway, and it meant that the title of earl no longer had the highest rank below the king. It also heralded the introduction of new noble titles from Continental Europe, which were to replace the old Norse titles.

Earl In the process of increasing his power and territory by annexing petty kingdoms, Norway's high king offered vassalage titles in return for recognition and military support from each petty king and his aristocracy. Such regional kings and chieftains received the title of earl (Norwegian: jarl). Earls were the only ones besides the king himself who were entitled to hold an army.

Later, during the Middle Ages, Earl was in general a title restricted to members of the royal family. There was usually no more than one earl in mainland Norway at one time, and sometimes none. The last earl in mainland Norway was appointed in 1295.

In mainland Norway, this title was normally used for one of two purposes:

- To appoint a de facto ruler in cases where the king was a minor or seriously ill, e.g. Haakon the Crazy in 1204 during the minority of King Guttorm, Skule Bårdsson in 1217 during the illness of King Inge Bårdsson.
- To appease a pretender to the throne without giving him the title of king, e.g. Eirik, the brother of King Sverre.

Baron (medieval) Lendmann was the highest rank attainable in the hird, and a lendmann stood beneath only earls and the king.

King Magnus VI abolished the title lendmann in 1277, and lendmen were given the title of baron In 1308, King Haakon V abolished this title, and a new set of titles was subsequently introduced: ridder (knight) and væpner (squire).

=== Medieval aristocratic titles (2nd system) ===
Title	English	Information
ridder	knight	A knight was styled Herr (Lord) and his wife Fru (Lady).
væpner	squire	

Knight and squire The titles of knight and squire were introduced in 1308.

=== Modern aristocratic titles ===
Introduced in 1671 with the titles of baron and count, and supplied with the title of marquis in 1709, the following system is the current in Norway.

Title	Title for wives	Title for sons	Title for daughters	Dignity or fief	Explanation
markis	markise			markisat	marquis
greve	grevinne	greve or baron	komtesse	grevskap	count
friherre baron	frifrue baronesse	friherre baron	friherrinne baronesse	friherreskap baroni	baron

The class of barons and the class of counts were even internally divided. A count would be a titular count (greve), a feudal count (lensgreve) or a national count (riksgreve). Likewise a baron would be a titular baron (friherre), a feudal baron (lensfriherre) or a national baron (riksfriherre). For example, a lensgreve uses the title greve only.

The correct combination of names and title when using Norwegian is first name + title + last name, e.g. Peder Anker grev Wedel Jarlsberg. The titles greve and friherre are abbreviated to respectively grev and friherr when used in names or addressing the person concerned, e.g. Peder Anker grev Wedel Jarlsberg or friherr Holberg. However, it is written Peder Anker Wedel Jarlsberg, greve til Jarlsberg when the complete title is added to the complete name separated by a comma.

Traditionally, ennobled men have kept their birth name along with their name of nobility. Titles come in addition to these.

Examples:

- Johann Friedrich Struensee (old name) → Johan Friedrich Struensee, Count to Struensee (old name, new title)
- Joachim Geelmuyden (old name) → Joachim Geelmuyden Gyldenkrantz (old name, new name).
- Vilhelm Marselis (old name) → Vilhelm Marselis Güldencrone, Baron to Wilhelmsborg (old name, new name, new title)

However, the old name is usually not kept when the name of nobility derives from this.

Examples:

- Hans Blix → Hans Blixencrone (not: Hans Blix Blixencrone)
- Bernt Ancher → Bernt Anker (not: Bernt Ancher Anker)

Whilst an ennobled man kept his old family name together with his name of nobility, descendants inherited the name of nobility only. However, descendants who receive the same given name as him usually receive his old family name too.

Example:

- Herman Leopoldus, ennobled as Herman Leopoldus Løvenskiold, has descendants named Herman Leopoldus Løvenskiold.

Marquis

In 1709 King Frederick IV of Norway granted the title Marquis of Lista, then spelled Lister, to Hugo Octavius Accoramboni of Florence in Italy. Apparently the Marquis of Lista died without issue.

In 1710 the same king granted the title Marquis of Mandal to Francisco di Ratta and to the latter's nephews Giuseppe di Ratta and Luigi di Ratta of Bologna in Italy. In Norway official recognition of this title was abolished under the 1821 Nobility Law. In Denmark it seems to have lasted until 1890.

Norway remains the only country in Scandinavia to which the title of marquis is attached.

Count The title of count was introduced in 1671.

In some families having the title of count, among others Wedel-Jarlsberg, younger sons bear the dependent title of baron. This is often specified in each family's letters patent.

Baron (modern) The modern title of baron was introduced in 1671.

== Noble institutions ==
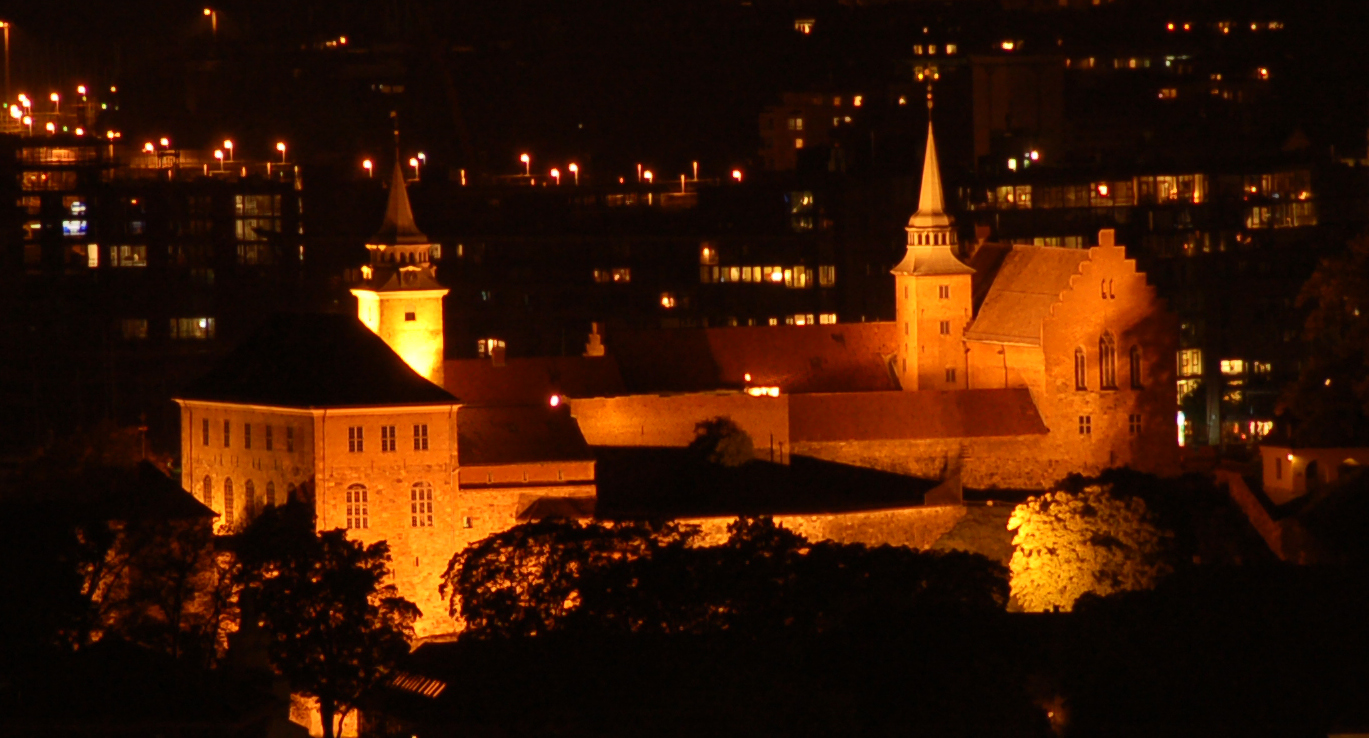
Until the absolute monarchy was introduced in 1660, the nobility paid homage to new kings at Akershus Fortress. Photographer: Hans-Petter Fjeld

The old nobility had several arenas on which they gathered. Beside the Council of the Kingdom, which was abolished in 1536, the nobility met at (1) homages to new kings (Norwegian: kongehylling), (2) meetings of the nobility (adelsmøte), (3) meetings of the estates (stendermøte), and (4) days of the lords (herredag). The nobility's function after 1536 was mainly administrative and ceremonial.

List of Noble Meetings

- Meeting of the Nobility of 1582
- Meeting of the Nobility of 1646

List of Meetings of the Estates

- Meeting of the Estates of 1639

List of Homages

- Homage of 1548
- Homage of 1591
- Homage of 1610
- Homage of 1648
- Hereditary Homage of 1661

List of Days of the Lords

- Days of the Lords of 1646
- Days of the Lords of 1652

=== Homage of 1591 ===
The homage of 1591 at Akershus Fortress provides information about the Norwegian nobility in the late 16th century. The Norwegian noblemen who were represented at the homage consisted of some Danes—names like Gyldenstierne, Lange, Juel, and Huitfeldt—, some Norwegians—names like Benkestok—, a couple of foreigners—Mowat (Scottish) and Norman de la Navité (French)—, and approximately 30 Norwegians with patronyms (names ending on -sen).

=== Request of 1648 ===
In 1648, the nobility requested in a letter to the king that ‘[...] we and our descendants must be held by the Christian right faith and the Augsburg Confession, so [that] it here in the Kingdom shall be maintained, protected, and shielded’ and that ‘we and our descendants of the noble estate here in Norway must be held by Norway’s law and right, [...] and enjoy the same privileges [...] as the nobility in Denmark [has received]’. Himself being Evangelical Lutheran, the king confirmed that ‘[...] the true and pure religion remains unfalsified in lands and kingdoms [...]’.

== Noble privileges ==
The noble privileges consisted of freedoms (Norwegian: frihet), rights (Norwegian: rettighet), and prerogatives (Norwegian: forrettighet). There were two primary sources for such privileges: the letters of privilege and the electoral charters, both issued by the king.

The royal decrees on the order of precedence, introduced in the 17th century, created the office nobility (Norwegian: embetsadel, rangadel), i.e. persons who by holding a high civilian or military office or by belonging to, most often, one of the three highest classes of rank automatically received noble status for themselves as well as for wife and legitimate children.

To be "granted" nobility and have those few privileges wealthy people only had to pay an amount of money to the Danish union king's private account ("partikulærkassen").

List of Electoral Charters

- Electoral Charter of 1449 (Only Norway.)
- Electoral Charter of 1483 (Both Norway and Denmark.)
- Electoral Charter of 1513 (Both Norway and Denmark.)
- Electoral Charter of 1524 (Only Norway.)
- Electoral Charter of 1536 (Only Denmark.)
- Electoral Charter of 1648 (Only Denmark.)

List of Noble Privileges

- Noble Privileges of 1582
- Noble Privileges of 1591
- Noble Privileges of 1646
- Noble Privileges of 1649
- Noble Privileges of 1661
- Counts' Privileges of 1671 (25 May)
- Barons' Privileges of 1671 (25 May)

List of Decrees on Order of Precedence

- Decree on the Order of Precedence of 1671
- Decree on the Order of Precedence of 1680
- Decree on the Order of Precedence of 1693
- Decree on the Order of Precedence of 1717
- Decree on the Order of Precedence of 1730
- Decree on the Order of Precedence of 1743
- Decree on the Order of Precedence of 1746
- Decree on the Order of Precedence of 1808

The decree of 1808 was the last of its kind to be in introduced in Norway. The personal union between Denmark and Norway was dissolved in 1814. In Denmark the decree of 1746, with some changes and amendments, still exists.

=== Noble privileges of 1582 ===
The noble privileges of 1582, given before the Meeting of the Nobility in the same year, decreed that a noblewoman who married a non-noble man should lose all her hereditary land to her nearest co-inheritor. The rule was designed with the intention of keeping noble land in noble hand and thus strengthening the nobility's power base. A similar clause in 1591 stated that a nobleman who married a non-noble woman should forfeit noble status for their children.

=== Noble privileges of 1661 ===
The noble privileges of 1661 (1) reconfirmed the neck and hand, (4) reconfirmed the right for the nobility on their estates and in thereto belonging woods and waters to hunt and fish, (5) stated jura patronatus, but together with a duty to maintain the church buildings and such, (7, 8) stated that the nobility shall enjoy rank and honour above all others, (10) stated that the nobility when on travels representing the king shall receive a certain monetary compensation, (13) stated that no nobleman may be sentenced from honour or life by others than the king and his highest court, (14) stated that no nobleman may be arrested, and (22) reconfirmed the birk right.

=== Tax freedom ===
Noblemen enjoyed personal tax freedom, although this was later abolished. Tax freedom for their seat farms remained.

Noblemen had other economic privileges, among others freedom from duty on imported and exported goods, such as beer and wine.

=== Seat farm ===
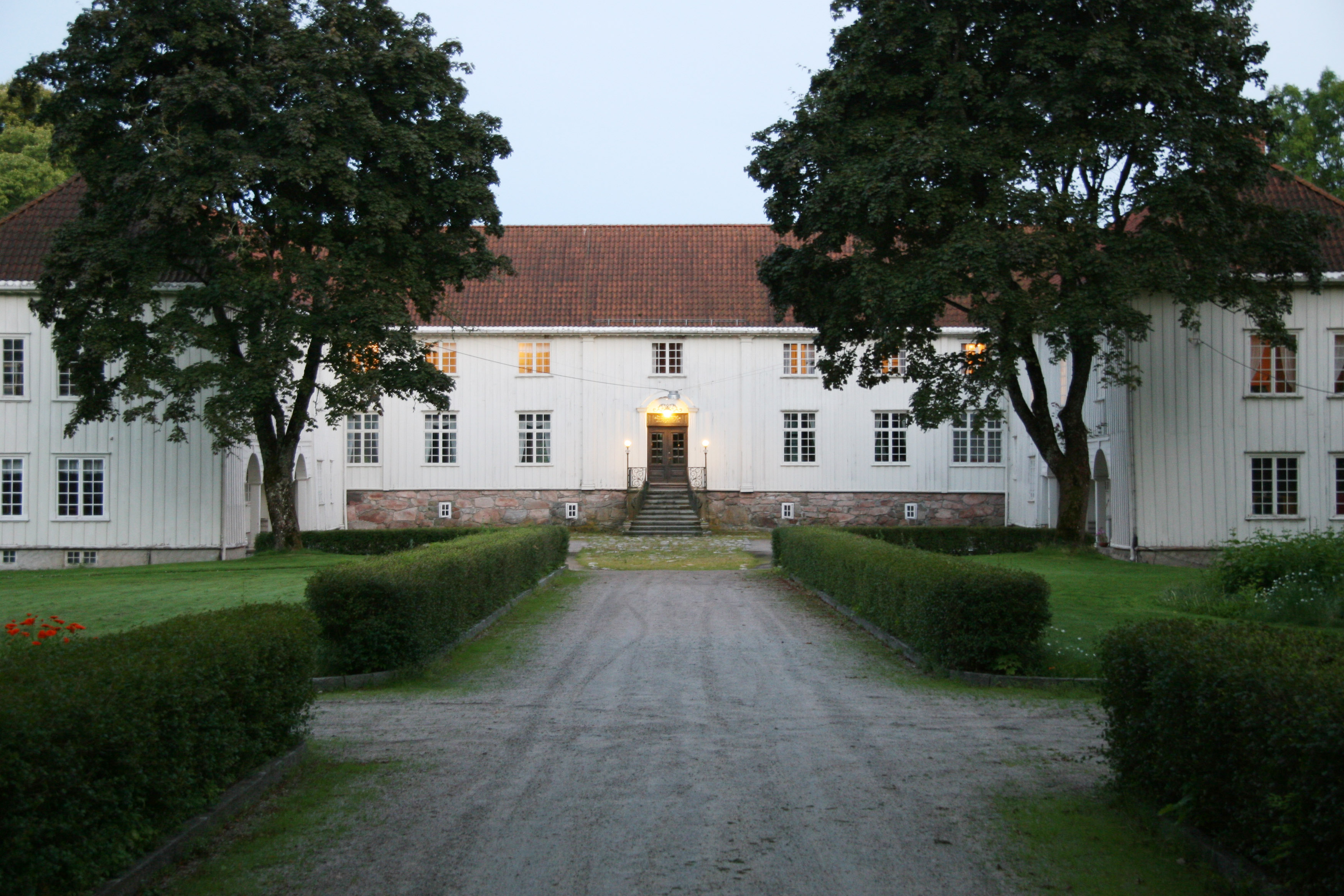
Elingård Farm in Østfold was a noble seat farm. The earliest known owner was Olav Torsteinsson (Gyldenhorn) in the 15th century. Photographer: Commons user Arkitekten

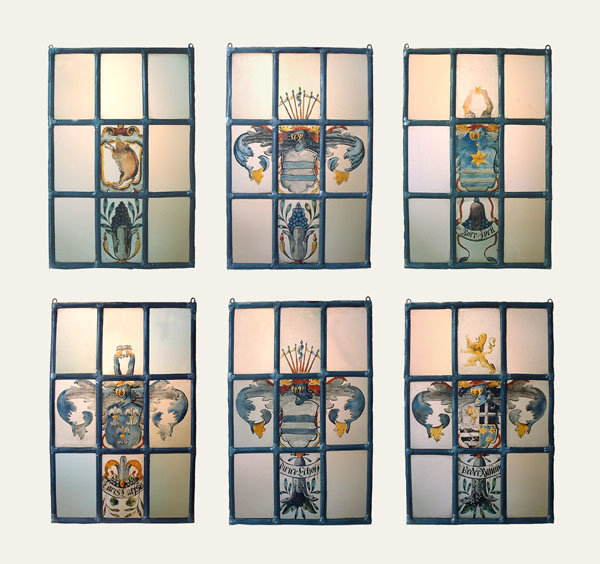
Glass paintings of the 17th century at Torsnes Farm in Jondal, Hardanger. Photographer: Elin Galtung Lihaug

Seat farms (Norwegian: setegård, setegard) were until 1660 an exclusive privilege of the nobility. A seat farm, a form of feudal demesne, was a nobleman's main residence; the place where he had his seat. Seat farms had, especially, freedom from tax and tithes.

While previously any farm on which a nobleman decided to reside would thereby acquire the status of seat farm, the right to become a seat farm was remarkably limited in 1639, when the law was changed to require a farm to have been a seat farm for a minimum of 40 years in order for it to be officially recognised. After 1800, the tax freedom was modified, and under the 1821 Nobility Law, the tax freedom was ended at the then current owner's death.

=== Weekday farmers ===
Weekday farmers (Norwegian: ukedagsbønder, vekedagsbønder) were persons who, as tenants of the noble, had a duty to work on the seat farm on weekdays. The system came from Denmark before 1600. It became most widespread in Eastern Norway, where the concentration of seat farms was highest, but existed also in other parts of the kingdom. From 1685 on, the duty work was limited to farmers who lived within two miles of the seat farm.

=== Feud right ===
The feud right (Norwegian: feiderett) was the right to officially proclaim a feud between two or more persons. A murder committed after the proclamation of a feud was considered an ‘honest murder’, and unlike ordinary murders, which normally received capital punishment, could be expiated with fines. The feud right is mentioned in almost all electoral charters from 1513 to 1648.

=== Conveyance right ===
The king and noblemen, as well as high officials, had the right to receive conveyance from farmers. The right was never a formal right, but rather a consequence of the ‘conveyance duty’ which was imposed on farmers. Conveyance duty (Norwegian: skyssplikt) is known since the 12th century and functioned as indirect taxation. In 1816, the duty was changed from being a free service to receiving payment per trip. However, the partial tax freedom which conveyance farmers had was abolished at the same time.

=== Neck and hand right ===
In 1646, the nobility achieved the possibility of having ‘neck and hand right’ (Norwegian: hals- og håndsrett), that is, the authority to arrest and to prosecute persons and to execute judgments. This right was limited to farms or fiefs over which noblemen had jurisdiction.

=== Charge and fine right ===
Related to the neck and hand right was the ‘charge and fine right’ (Norwegian: sikt- og sakefallsrett), that is, the authority to raise a charge against and to fine persons. This right, too, was limited to each nobleman's area of jurisdiction.

=== Birk right ===
The birk right (Norwegian: birkerett) was the authority to appoint judges at the birk court, etcetera; birks were an ancient form of local jurisdiction adopted in Norway on the Danish model. Nine birks were created in 1649, but abolished already in 1651. The first real birks came in 1671 with the creation of the Countship of Larvik, in 1673 with the creation of the Countship of Griffenfeld, and in 1678 with the creation of the Barony of Rosendal. In addition the birk right was granted to the Halsnøy Monastery in 1661, the Lysekloster Estate in 1661, and the Svanøy Estate in 1685. The two countship birks and the barony birk lasted until 1821, when they were ‘entirely abolished’.

=== Jus patronatus ===
The jus patronatus (patronage right) consisted of jus presentandi, the right to propose clergy for a specific church, and later became jus vocandi, the right to appoint such clergy. Furthermore, the patron had the right to part of the church taxes and other income of the church. Jus patronatus did not have any relevance in Norway until after the 1640s, when a few noblemen began to receive it. This privilege was never widespread in the kingdom.

=== Various ===
Around 1277, lendmen and skutilsveins received tax freedom for themselves and two members of their household, and ordinary members of the hird received the same, but for one member of their household.

In 1548, the nobility's attempts to weaken farmers’ allodial land right (Norwegian: odelsrett) were rejected by the king and the Danish Council of the Kingdom.

== Noble symbolism ==
=== Coat of arms ===
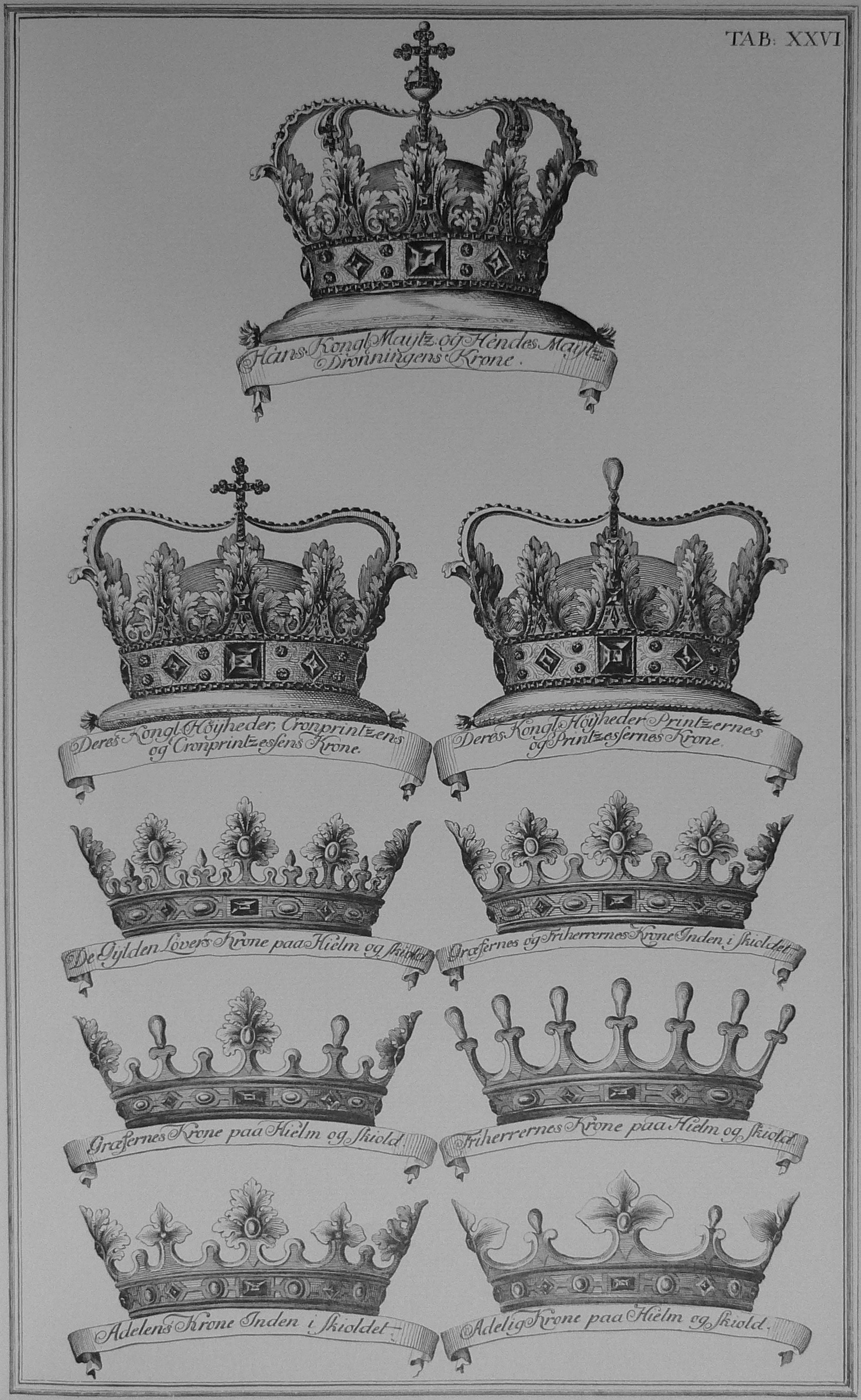
Modern-time coronets of rank. Nobles and counts have one variant used on helms and shields and one variant used within shields. Barons' coronet applies to both locations.

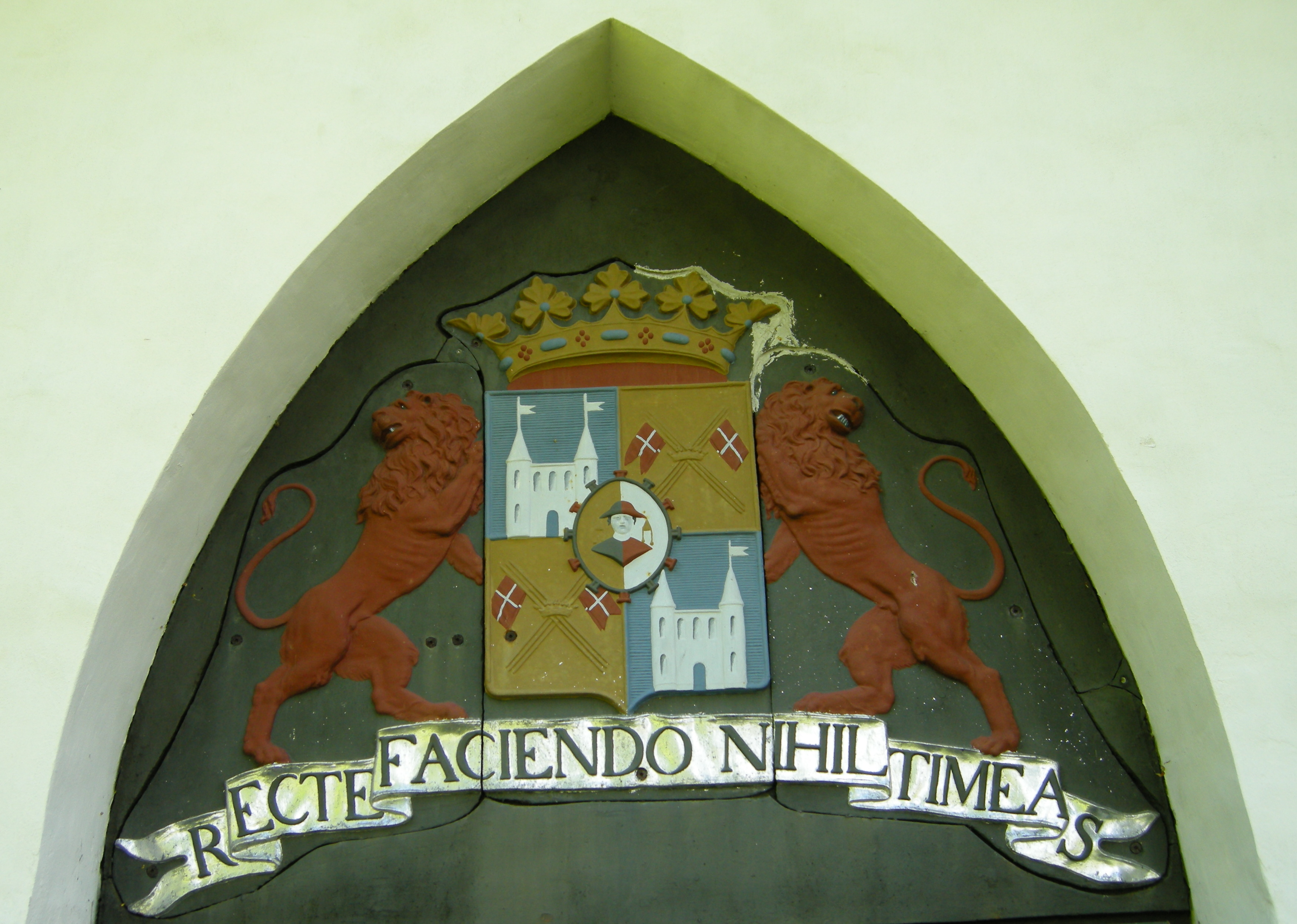
Coat of arms, including coronet, supporters, and motto, above the entrance to the family tomb of the Counts of Wedel-Jarlsberg.

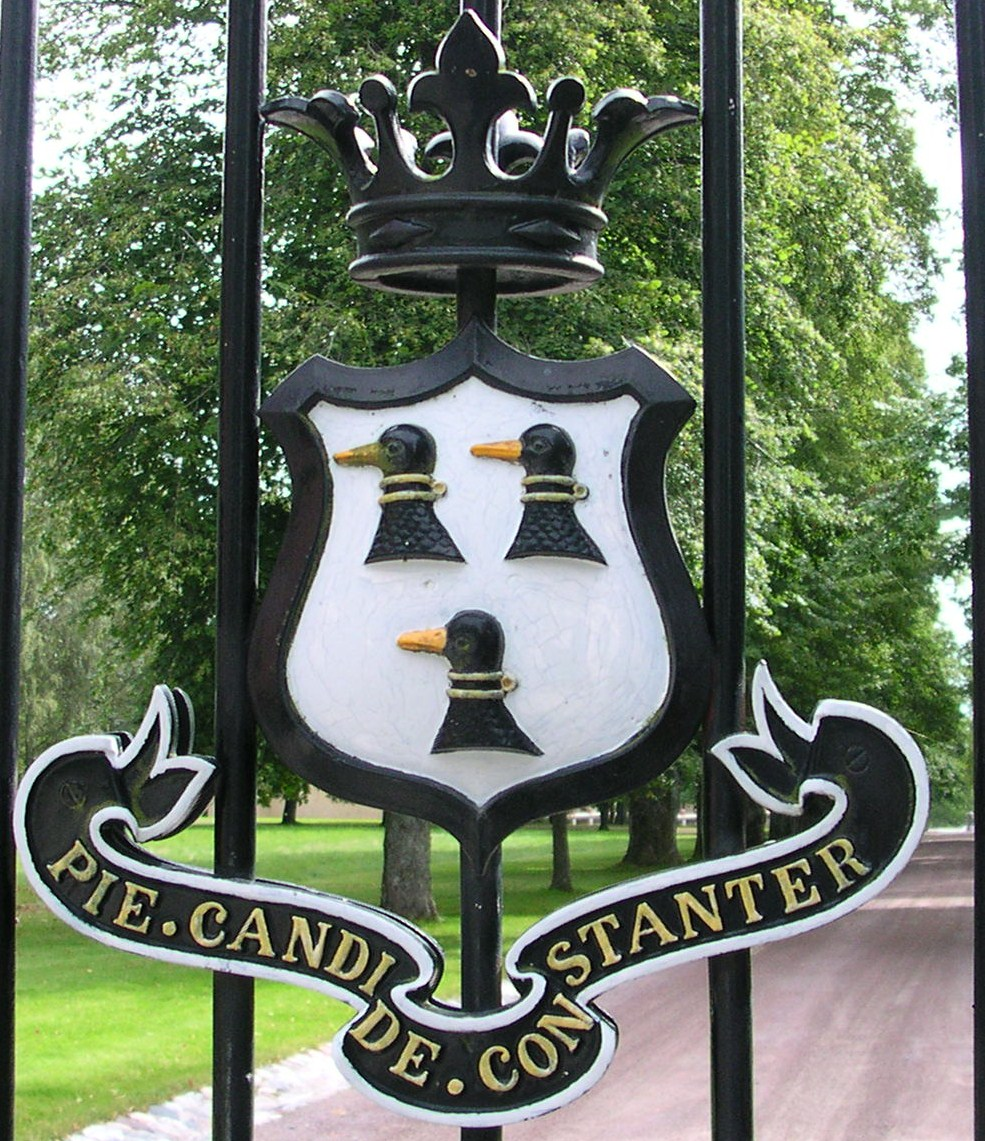
Gate to the manor of the Treschow family. It shows the family coat of arms together with coronet and motto.

The use of coats of arms was originally a custom developed and maintained by the nobility, but it was not exclusive to this estate. Norwegian farmers and burghers, as well as the non-noble parts of the clergy, had since early times borne arms in addition to more commonly used house marks.

While the arms of the old nobility were of ancient origin and inherited through generations within each family, and therefore were not a (known) privilege from the king, the arms of the new nobility were often granted by the king upon ennoblement. In some cases, the ennobled person's former coat of arms or his wishes could be regarded in the process of composing new arms and achievements.

Helm According to Dano-Norwegian custom, both nobles and non-nobles could use an open helm above the shield. (In Sweden, open helms were a privilege exclusive for the nobility.) Nobles used one, barons used two, and counts used three helms. Alternatively, counts’ helms had eleven bars and barons’ helms had seven bars.

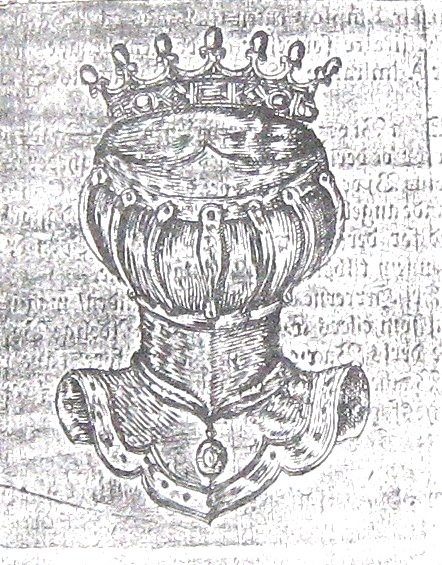
Barons’ coronet and helm (seven bars).

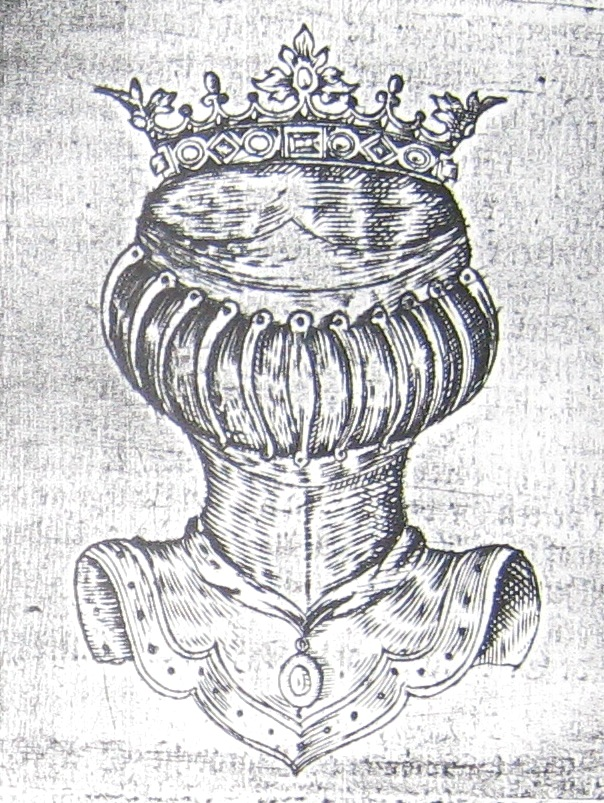
Counts’ coronet and helm (eleven bars).

Coronet Noble coronets (Norwegian: adelskrone) or coronets of rank (rangkrone), whether physical coronets or appearing in heraldic artwork, were reserved for the nobility. There were specific coronets for counts, barons, and nobility. In addition, the Golden Lions—illegitimate royal descendants—had an exclusive coronet.

Noble coronet on helm and shield.

Coronet of Dukes on helm and shield.

Coronet of Marquesses on helm and shield.

Coronet of counts on helm and shield.

Coronet of barons on helm and shield and within shield.

Supporters Supporters were normally given only to counts.

Motto Some noble families have mottos. These are always in Latin.

Examples:

- Counts of Wedel-Jarlsberg: RECTE FACIENDO NEMINEM TIMEAS
- Barons of Rosendal: MELIUS MORI IN LIBERTATE QUAM VIVERE IN SERVITUTE
- Anker: GLORIA EX UTILE
- Treschow: PIE CANDIDE CONSTANTER

=== Names ===
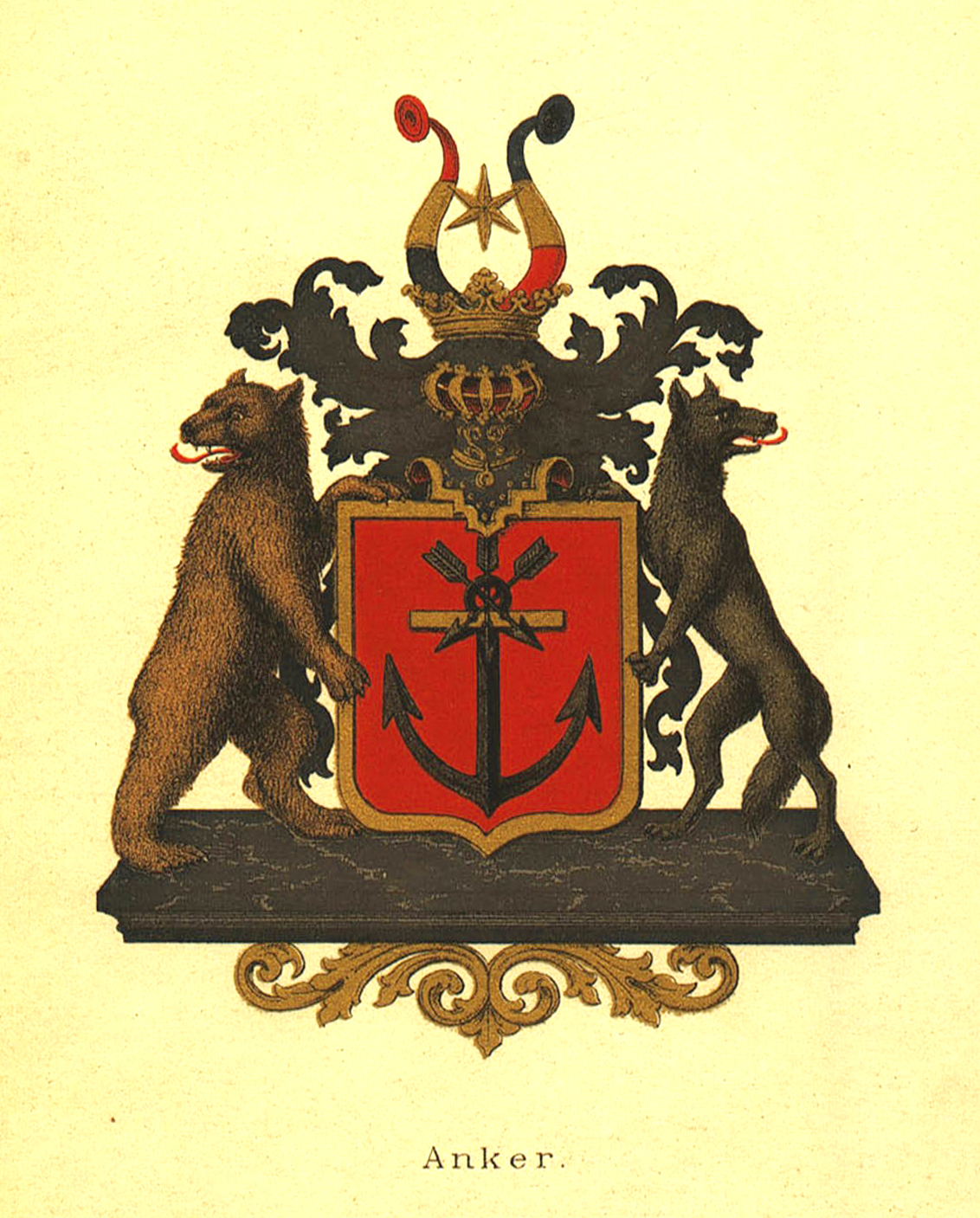
Canting arms of the Anker family.

Almost unique internationally and different from the continental nobility, where families have named themselves after the piece of land that they possess, Nordic nobles have since the 16th century in general adopted family names of an abstract and artistical character, often based on their respective coats of arms. For example, the noble family whose arms were a golden star, took the name Gyldenstierne (English: Golden Star). As this custom of the old nobility established itself as permanent, also the new nobility, that is persons and families ennobled after the Medieval Ages, often received similar names when ennobled.

Other examples are Anker (English: Anchor), Gyllenpistol (Golden Gun) in Sweden, Hästesko (Horseshoe) in Sweden, Huitfeldt (White Field), Løvenørn (Lion Eagle), Natt och Dag (Night and Day) in Sweden, Rosenvinge (Rose Wing), Svanenhielm (Swan Helm), Svinhufvud (Swine Head) in Sweden, and Tordenskiold (Thunder Shield).

Particle The use of particles like af, von, and de—all these mean of—was no particular privilege for the nobility, but on the other hand almost exclusively used by and associated with them. Especially in the late 17th century and the 18th century, one would often receive a particle together with one's old or new name when ennobled. Examples are families like de Gyldenpalm (lit. ‘of Goldenpalm’) and, with two particles, von Munthe af Morgenstierne (lit. ‘of Munthe of Morningstar’).

Prominent non-noble families having used particles are von Cappelen, von der Lippe, and de Créqui dit la Roche.

Preposition A nobleman had the right to write himself to (Norwegian: til) the seat farm(s) or the estate(s) on which he resided, for example ‘Sigurd Jonsson til Sudreim’. This preposition must not be confused with particles, which were a part of names.

=== Consumption ===
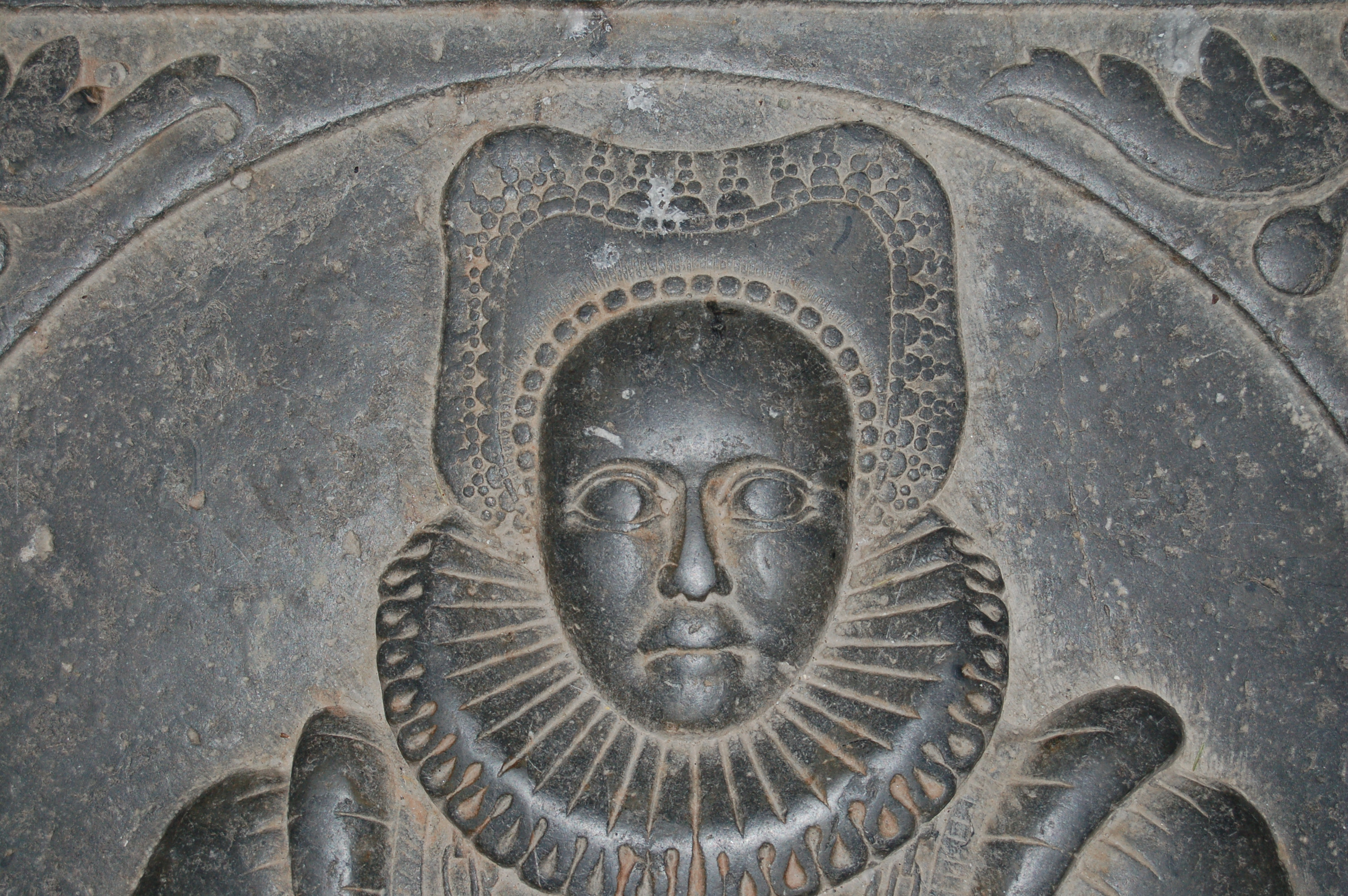
The gravestone of Ulvhild Iversdatter to Melau may, among other available sources, illustrate noblewomen's fashion in the late 16th and the early 17th century. Through exclusive clothing and jewelry the nobility demonstrated great wealth, and also in this regard they distinguished themselves from the estate of commoners.

Clothing Already in the Medieval Ages a man was not allowed to dress in clothes implying that he belonged to another estate than his actual.

Whilst commoners could not wear finer clothes than nobles did, the nobility had to make sure they were not better dressed than the king and his family. In 1528 a royal decree decided that no noble could own more than three clothes of silk. No ladies or maids could wear broad bonnets. Pearls in textiles as well as textiles containing gold were reserved for royal persons.

Usually a cloth's value was relatively big. Accessories were no exception. For example, a pearl bonnet alone could cost as much as 100 dollars; this was three years' salary for a carpenter. Expensive were also gold chains, bonnets with ostrich feathers, etcetera. As such clothes were not only a matter of dressing, but also a part a family's capital.

Slit clothes were usual among (female) nobles. This would reveal that a garment had two layers of textile.

Education Many noblemen received their education at the Sorø Academy in Denmark, a knight academy. Young men of the high nobility studied also at German universities.

16th and 17th century During their trade with foreigners the nobility acquired luxurious products, for example chocolates, saffron, cinnamon, nutmeg, olive, and citrus. They desired and received new technology, such as stoves and bracket clocks. Also living animals were popular.

It was customary to give each other presents, for example horses, precious metals, and exotic fruits, especially to more important nobles or if one wished a service in return.

A case of exceptional dimensions was when William IV, Landgrave of Hesse-Kassel asked whether Tycho Brahe in Denmark was able to get him some reindeers. Brahe wrote to his relative Axel Gyldenstierne, Governor-general of Norway, and after some struggle Gyldenstierne was able to find five animals, of which two were sent by ship to Brahe.

== Relation to the people ==
=== Cognatic descent of medieval aristocracy ===
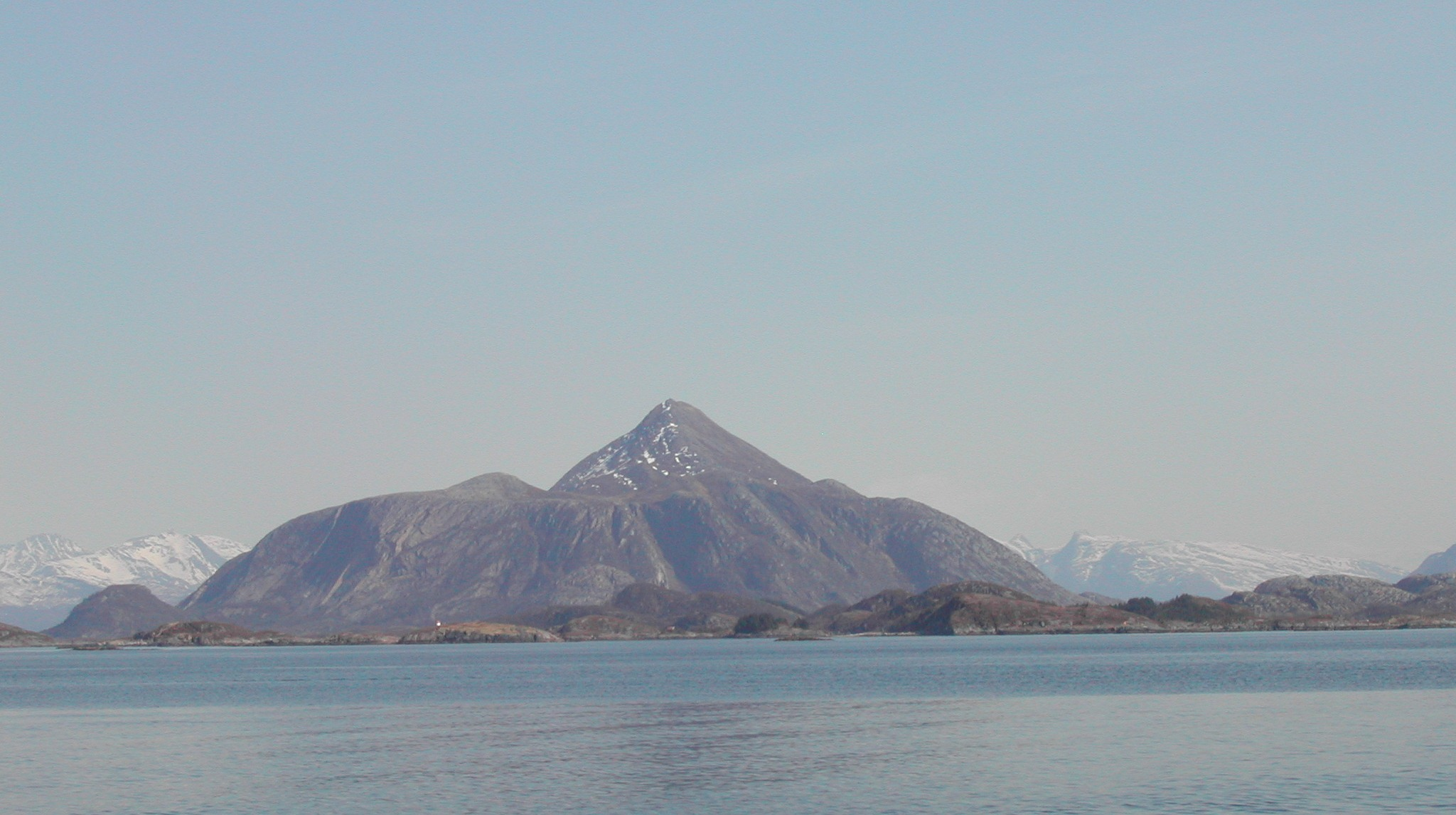
Meløya was the seat of the major noble family of Benkestok. Both the farm and the estate were inherited by non-noble descendants. Photo: Commons user Knut

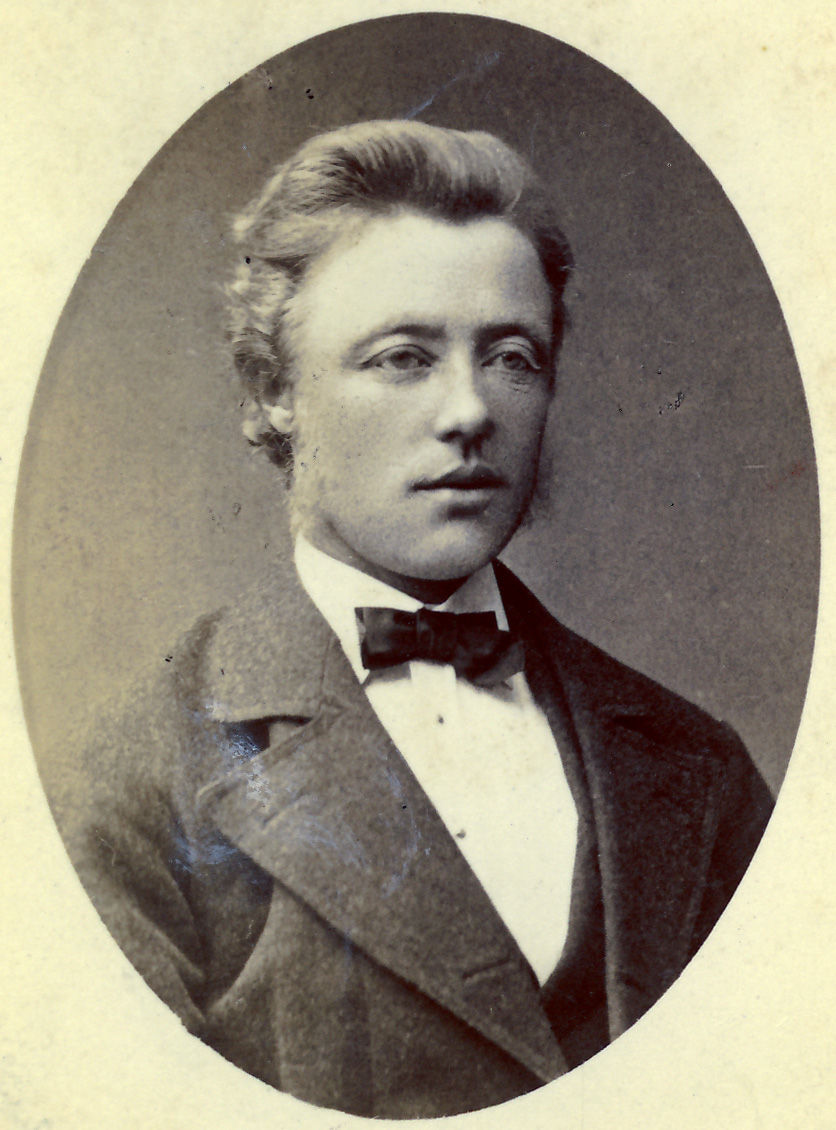
Descendant of the medieval aristocracy: Carl Martin Ellingsen (1848–1926). Photo: Sophus Körner

A large number of Norwegians may trace ancestral lines back to members of various levels of medieval aristocracy. They must very often cross numerous cognatic links (Norwegian: kvinneledd) and go back to the 16th century in order to establish a connection to the nobility. (An important consideration in this regard is that many experts dispute some popularly accepted family relations, which they consider undocumented or obviously wrong.) Queen Sonja of Norway, born a commoner, has noblemen among her distant forefathers.

Whilst nearly all families of medieval aristocracy have become patrilineally extinct, there are families today whose patrilineal ancestors were close cognatic descendants of old noble families, for example some Nordland families, the most prominent being the Ellingsen family, whose progenitor shipper and tradesman Elling Christophersen was a great-grandson of Margrethe Jonsdotter Benkestok, and the Christensen family of the Husby Estate, whose progenitor shipper and tradesman Anders Christensen was a great-great-grandson of aforementioned Margrethe.

Even though a family could lose their noble status, they would usually keep their land and fortune. There are examples of non-noble descendants who have inherited previously noble land centuries after the noble family concerned had become patrilineally extinct. One example is the estate of the Benkestok family, who lost their noble status in the late 16th century and disappeared patrilineally after 1672. The estate originally consisted of land in Eastern, Western, and Northern Norway as well as on the Faroe Islands and Shetland. Whilst the first generations of inheritors received large portions of land, it would subsequently be divided into smaller and smaller parts so that inheritors of later generations each received, be it, a large farm.

Concerning descent from royalty through nobility, nobility expert Tore Vigerust has stated, though as a conservative estimate, that roughly 10,000 Norwegians living today can document with certainty their descent from the old kings of Norway and European royal houses. Vigerust has identified the late medieval noble families Gyldenløve of Austrått and Rosensverd as families whose royal descent is verifiable.

Examples:

- Carl Martin Ellingsen (1848–1926), of the aforementioned Nordland family Ellingsen, was a Member of Parliament.

=== Cognatic descent of modern aristocracy ===
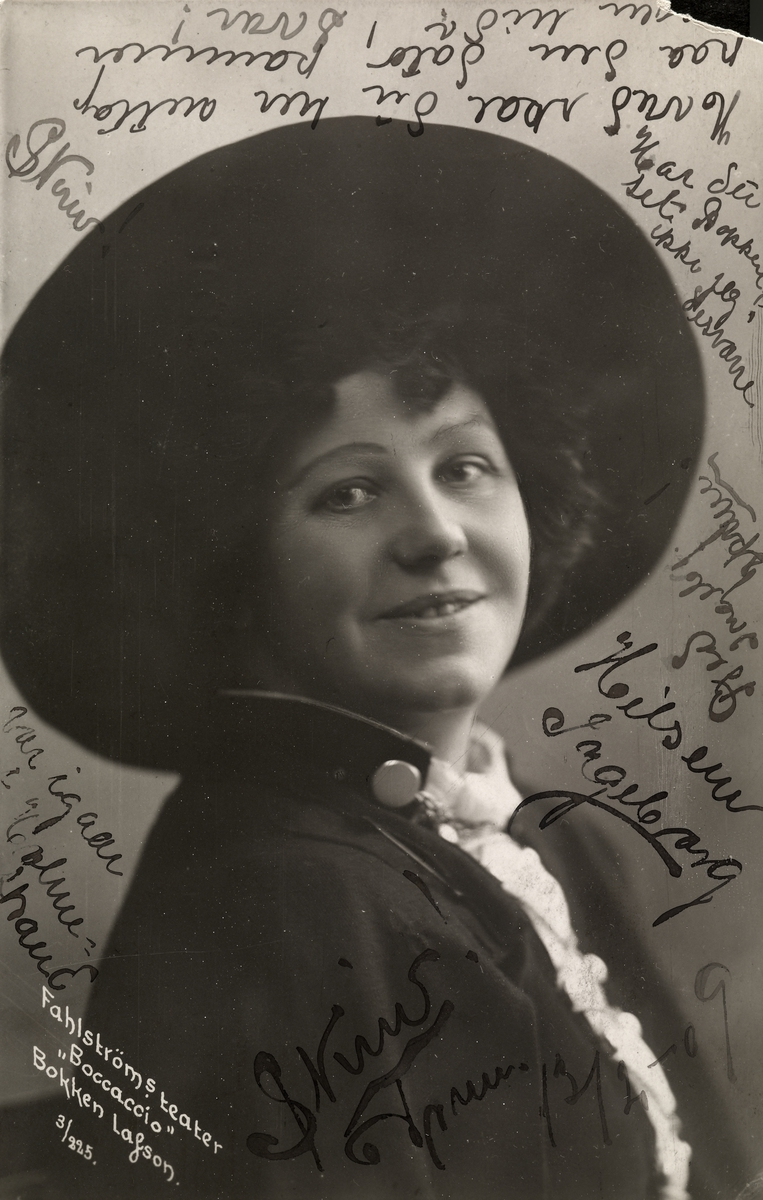
Descendant of the modern aristocracy: Bokken Lasson (1871–1970). Photo: unknown

A considerably smaller number of Norwegians descend from families of modern aristocracy, patrilineally as well as through cognatic links. Among such descendants, one finds several nationally and even internationally prominent persons.

Examples:

- Fridtjof Wedel-Jarlsberg Nansen (1861–1930), whose mother was Baroness Adelaide of Wedel-Jarlsberg, was an explorer.
- Bokken Lasson (1871–1970), whose mother was a Munthe af Morgenstierne, was a cabaret singer and as well a member of the Kristiania Bohemians.
- Pontine Paus (born 1973), a granddaughter of Countess Hedevig of Wedel-Jarlsberg, is a world-leading designer of handbags.

=== Miscellaneous ===
Through many ages, common people have desired either to be noble or to descend from members of this estate. This has led some to construct fraudulent ahnentafels (pedigree charts) or to accept erroneous ahnentafels.

An extreme case of such ahnentafels is that of Jon Bratt Otnes (1919–2004). Otnes was born into the lowest class of the farmer estate; his father was a cotter (Norwegian: husmann). In the 1970s and with a heavily erroneous ahnentafel, Otnes began to claim publicly that he was the current head of the Medieval noble family of Brat/Bratt and that he thus could have been King of Norway and of Sweden. This case caused much controversy between the 1970s and 2000.

During parts of the Romantic Nationalist epoch and the subsequent worshipping of Vikings, when it was popular and/or gave a particular high status to demonstrate descent from the 'real' (i.e. Medieval, non-foreign) noble families and kings of Norway, fraudulent pedigrees flourished. This was the case also during the illegitimate National Unification rule during Germany's occupation of Norway (1940–1945).

== Nobility as a term ==
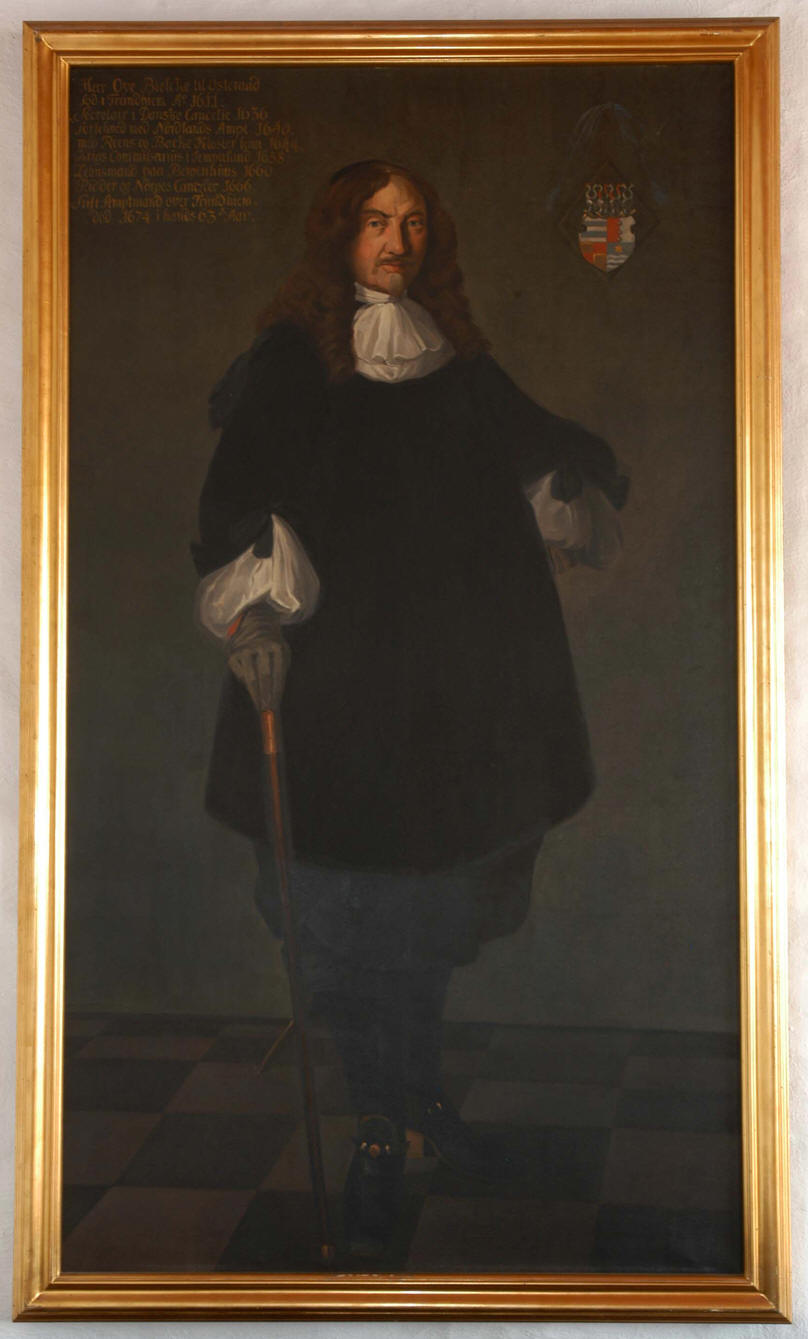
Ove Jensen Bjelke, Chancellor of Norway, belonged to the old nobility in Denmark and to the new nobility in Norway. Painter: unknown Photographer: Commons user Orland

=== Medieval terms ===
The medieval aristocracy called themselves hird and later ‘free men’ likewise as commoners were called ‘unfree’. Knights were gathered in a particular class known as the Knighthood (Norwegian: Ridderskapet), which stood above what was called ‘ordinary nobility’ (Norwegian: menig adel). The aristocracy did not adopt and use the term ‘nobility’ (Norwegian: adel) until the late 15th and the early 16th century; this originally German word arrived at the same time as the German Oldenburg kings of Norway. However, the entity was completely the same before and after the introduction of this term.

=== Old and new nobility ===
In some cases it is difficult to draw a clear border between old nobility alias the medieval aristocracy and new nobility alias the modern aristocracy. A consensual definition is that new nobility are persons and families who were ennobled by letters patent by Norwegian monarchs, primarily monarchs after and including Queen Margaret. Even though the term ‘new nobility’ is often considered as identical with ‘post-medieval nobility’, a not unconsiderable amount of so-called letter-noble families were ennobled and operated politically and militarily in the Late Medieval Age, among others the Rosenvinge family, ennobled in 1505.

Old nobility from Denmark is considered as new nobility in Norway, not least because they represented a new era—that of foreign rule—in Norway's history.

=== High and low nobility ===
The high nobility consists of titled persons and families. The low nobility is untitled. This set of term applies mainly to nobility after 1671, when the titles of count and of baron were introduced. Families whose members have had seats in the pre-1536 Council of the Kingdom—the Riksråd—are considered as high nobility in Norway. They are even known under their own term, riksråd nobility (Norwegian: riksrådsadel).

=== Sword nobility and robe nobility ===
The terms sword nobility (Norwegian: sverdadel) and robe nobility (Norwegian: kjoleadel) refer to the nobility before and after 1660, respectively.

=== Office nobility and letter nobility ===
These terms are treated in this article's section Modern aristocracy.

=== Uradel ===
Uradel (English: lit. ‘primeval nobility’) is an originally German and romantic term that was coined in the 1820s and later adopted into the Norwegian language as well as into Danish and Swedish. The term refers to the medieval aristocracy. The opposite of uradel is brevadel (English: lit. ‘letter nobility’).

== Other terms of nobility ==
=== Authentic farmer nobility ===
Farmer nobility (Norwegian: bondeadel) refers to farmers who were noble.

This term may also be used unofficially to describe farmers who had been noble or who had such ancestry through cognatic links and within a short genealogical timeframe. They were not a part of the Norwegian nobility.

For example, in 1768, when asked by the authorities in Copenhagen whether there still lived old nobility in the districts Senja and Troms in Northern Norway, a Danish-rooted official wrote: ‘Of old nobility I know nothing here in the north, but here is far too much farmer nobility or Benkestok nobility!’ As an immigrant to the region, he was unfamiliar with the strong feeling of pride among the so-called page nobility (see below) and the farmers of aristocratic origin.

=== Romantic nationalistic farmer nobility ===
After Norway achieved constitutional independence in 1814, in the period of romantic nationalism that followed, the urban ‘cultural élite’ as well as some farmers themselves began to consider the ‘Norwegian farmer’ as representative or a symbolic figure of ‘Norwegianness’. Norwegian farmers had always been relatively free compared to farmers in continental Europe, something to which the lack of a large and strong nobility had contributed. Farmers had in general sufficient amounts of food, and lived ‘in peaceful and natural circumstances’. Furthermore, from the middle of the 18th century, and peaking in the 19th, many Norwegian farmers managed to buy their own farms. Factors like these contributed to some farmers coming to regard themselves as a kind of farmer nobility. Such ideas are reflected, for example, in romantic nationalistic literature, but the term has never had any legal currency in Norway, and such farmers were and remained commoners.

For example, the teacher Andreas Austlid wrote in his book Salt fraa folkehøgskulen (1926) about his home parish: ‘An old parish of wealth, broad and satisfied and good – the most beautiful in the whole valley. A kind and calm farmer nobility - but self-supplied [with food], with much good and much low ancestry ...’

=== Page nobility ===
Page nobility (Norwegian: knapeadel; knape means page or boy) was and is a non-legal term referring to historical and in many cases biological descendants of the clerical setesveins in Northern Norway. As traders and shippers, these descendants in the late 16th and the 17th centuries constituted the leading non-noble class in the region. In the 18th century, however, the term knape was in general used for all non-privileged traders and shippers regardless of their backgrounds.

=== Expressions and extrapolated usage ===
In modern Norwegian language, there are several expressions containing noble terms and titles. Examples are:

- adel, adelig: arbeidets adel, nobility of labour
- fyrste, fyrstelig: fyrstelig mottakelse, be received in a splendid manner, more seg fyrstelig, rejoice like a prince
- greve, grevelig: (ankomme) i grevens tid, (arrive) just in time and/or as the last person, leve som en greve, live like a count, i.e. luxuriously

Furthermore, noble titles are used to describe persons who within respective sections of society have a leading position. Examples are:

- -adel: lønnsadel, lit. wage nobility, nikkersadel, lit. knickerbockers nobility (Oslo only)
- -baron: matbaron, food (chain) baron, oljebaron, oil baron, hotellbaron, hotel baron, "narkobaron" drug lord
- -fyrste: finansfyrste, prince of finances, åndsfyrste, intellectual prince, tåkefyrste, lit. fog prince
- -aristokrati: pengearistokrati, moneyed aristocracy, åndsaristokrati, intellectual aristocracy

== See also ==
- Aristocracy of officials
- Foreign nobility in Norway
- Norwegian patriciate

== Literature ==
- Aschehougs Norgeshistorie 1 → See: Lillehammer (1994)
- Aschehougs Norgeshistorie 2 → See: Krag (1995)
- Aschehougs Norgeshistorie 3 → See: Helle (1995)
- Helle, Knut (1995): Aschehougs Norgeshistorie 3 (Under kirke og kongemakt 1130–1350)
- Johansen, Øystein Kock (2000): Bronse og makt
- Lillehammer, Arnvid (1994): Aschehougs Norgeshistorie 1 (Fra jeger til bonde –inntil 800 e.Kr.)
- Krag, Claus (1995): Aschehougs Norgeshistorie 2 (Vikingtid og rikssamling 800–1130)
