= Thomes Thomesen =

Norwegian merchant and politician

Thomes Thomesen (1816–1887) was a Norwegian merchant and politician.

He was a merchant, ship-owner and shipbuilder in the town of Kragerø. He was elected to the Norwegian Parliament from the city in 1862, and served one term.

He was the brother of jurist and politician Ole Thomesen. He was married to Marthine Olea Debes (1825–1876). Through his daughter Fernanda Nissen he was a father-in-law of Lars Holst from 1882; they divorced after Thomes Thomesen's death. Through another daughter, painter Sophie Marie Stoltenberg Thomesen, he was the father-in-law of Erik Werenskiold and grandfather of Werner Werenskiold and Dagfin Werenskiold.
