= Werenskiold (noble family) =

- Nobility
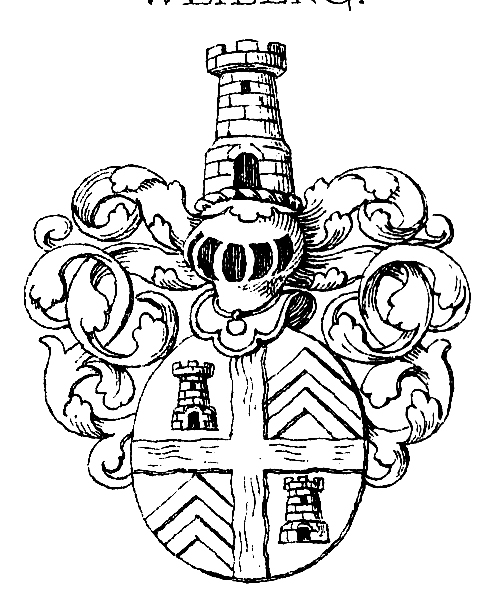
- Werenskiold coat of arms.
- Country: Denmark; Norway
- Place of origin: Ribe
- Founded: 1717 (ennobled)
- Founder: Werner Nielssen
- Estates: Borregård Manor; Hafslund Manor

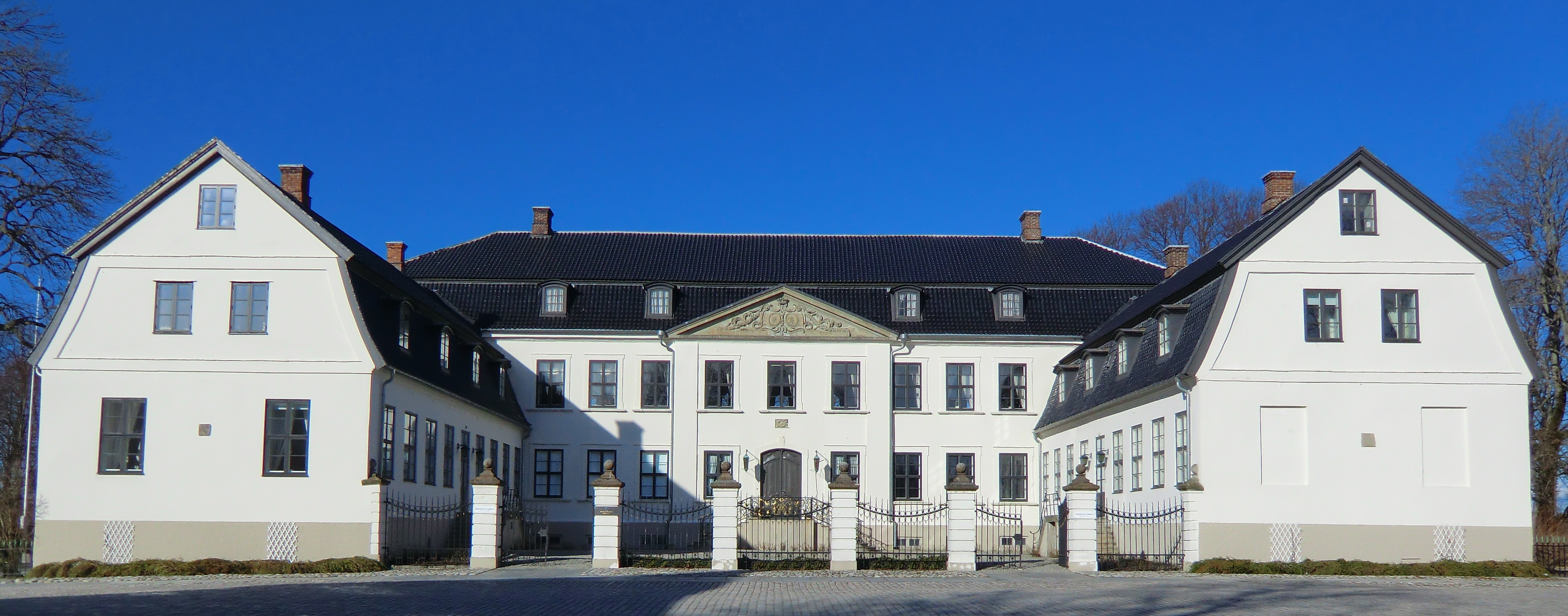
Hafslund Manor in Sarpsborg

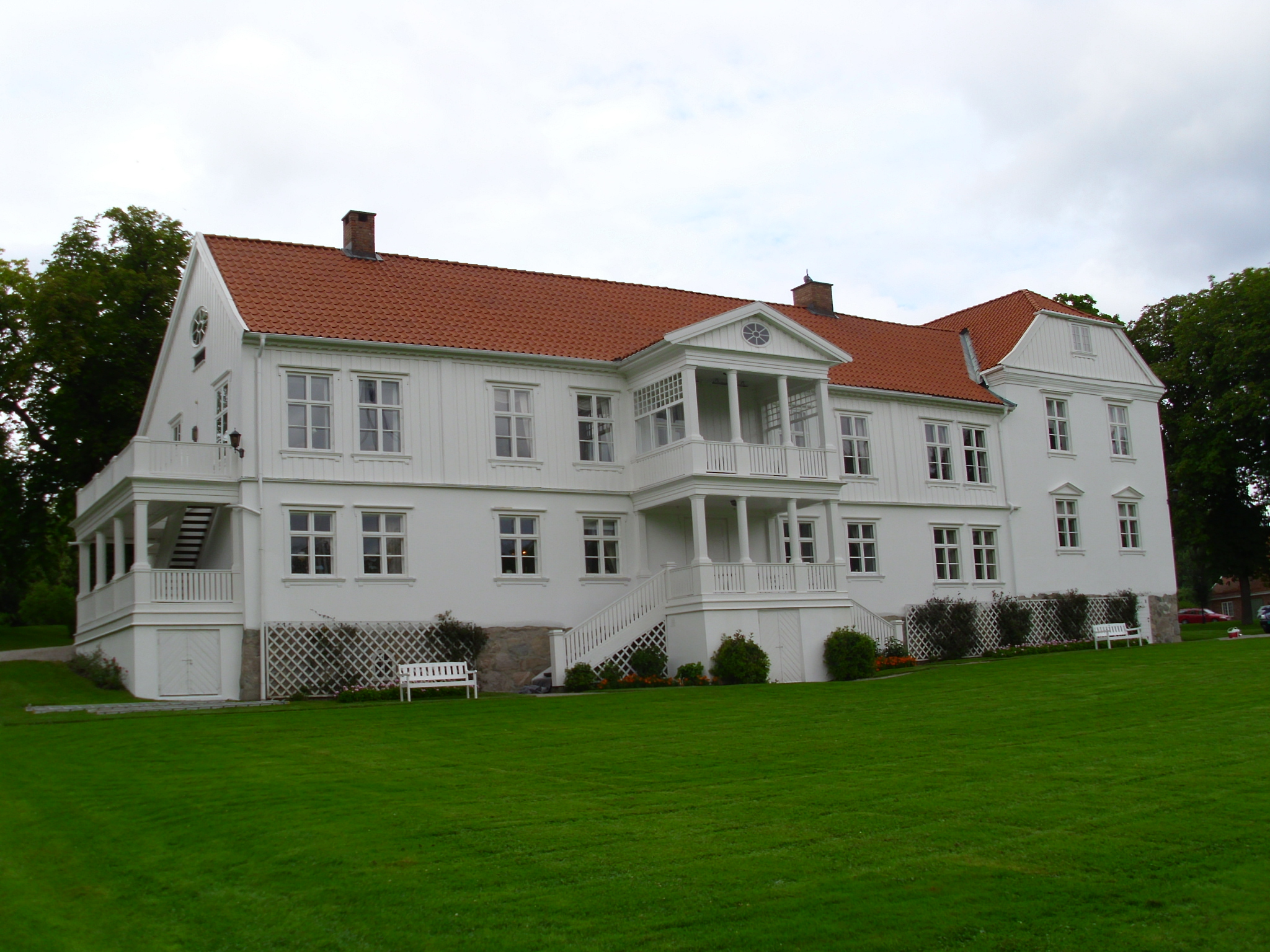
Borregård Manor in Sarpsborg

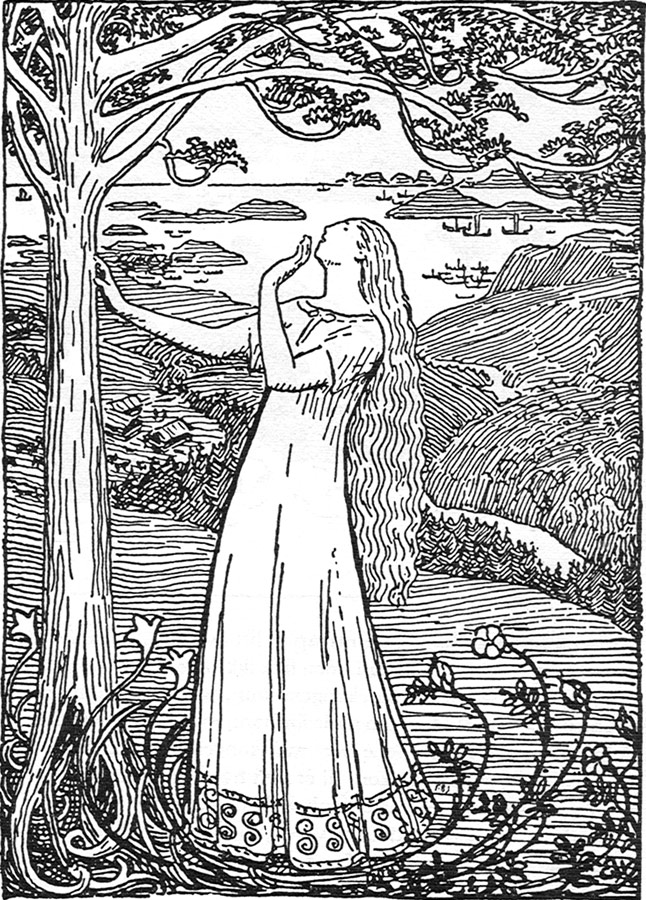
Erik Werenskiold is known for his illustrations of the sagas. This drawing is based on Queen Ragnhild's Dream.

The Werenskiold family, also spelled Werenschiold, Wærenskiold, Werenskjold etcetera, is a Danish and Norwegian noble family living in Norway.

== History ==
Werner Nielssen (1625–1695) relocated to Farsund in Lister og Mandal from Ribe in Jutland. He was a lawyer who in 1664, became councilor in Christiania (now Oslo). He was married 1.) in 1662 to Christiania M. Ingeborg Eriksdatter (d. 1664) through whom he acquired Borregård Manor (Borregård Hovedgård) in Sarpsborg; 2.) in 1667 with Helvig Christensdatter (1653–1692). In 1674, he bought Hafslund Manor (Hafslund Hovedgård) in Sarpsborg. He was the father of three sons: Niels Wernersen took over Hafslund Manor, Jens Wernersen took over Borregård Manor, Christian Wernersen who acquired Trosvik in Fredrikstad.

His son Niels Wernersen (1669–1741) was married in 1698 to Elisabeth de Tønsberg (1673–1742), daughter of Mads Mathias de Tønsberg, (Amtmann over Buskerud) and Anne Cathrine Willumsdatter Mecklenburg. He became county governor of Smålenen (now Østfold) and assistant council at the Supreme Court. Niels Wernersen was in 1717 ennobled under the name Werenschiold with a new coat of arms.

== Notable Family members ==
- Dagfin Werenskiold
- Erik Werenskiold
- Werner Werenskiold
- no:Nils Werenskiold

== See also ==
- Danish nobility
- Norwegian nobility

== Related reading ==
- Werenskjold, Rolf (1999) Slekten Werenskiold - Wærnschiold : 1625-1999 : den vestre linje (Volda : R.F. Werenskjold) ISBN 8292090002
