= Fernanda Nissen =

Norwegian politician and journalist (1862–1920)

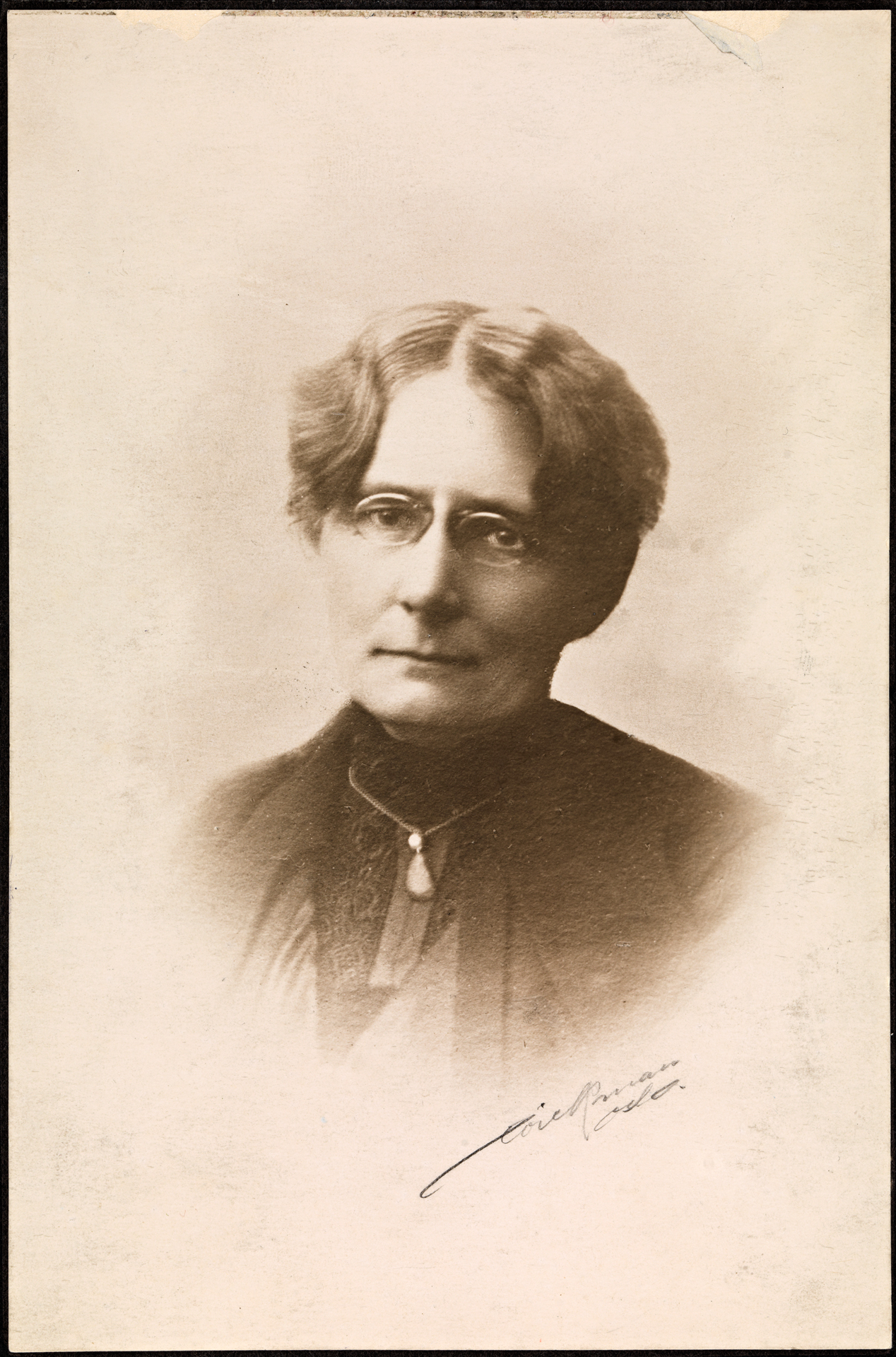
- Born: Petra Gregorine Fernanda Thomesen; 15 August 1862; Sandøkedal, Norway
- Died: 3 April 1920 (aged 57); Barmen, Germany
- Occupations: Teacher; Journalist; Literary critic Theatre critic Magazine editor Public film censor Trade unionist Politician
- Spouse(s): Lars Holst; Oscar Nissen
- Parent: Thomes Thomesen
- Relatives: Ole Thomesen (uncle); Erik Werenskiold (brother-in-law); Werner Werenskiold (nephew); Dagfin Werenskiold (nephew)

Petra Gregorine Fernanda Nissen (née Thomesen; 15 August 1862 – 3 April 1920) was a Norwegian journalist, literary critic, theatre critic, politician and feminist pioneer.

== Early and personal life ==
Fernanda Thomesen was born in Sandøkedal Municipality, as the daughter of ship owner and consul Thomes Thomesen and Bertha Marthine Olea Debes. She was a niece of Ole Thomesen.

She was married to newspaper editor and politician Lars Holst from 1882 to 1895, and to physician Oscar Egede Nissen from 1895 to 1911. Through her sister Sophie, she was sister-in-law of painter and illustrator Erik Werenskiold, and an aunt of Werner and Dagfin Werenskiold.

== Career ==
Nissen worked several years as a teacher, and later journalist. She was journalist for Dagbladet in the 1880s, and literary critic and theatre critic for the newspaper Social-Demokraten from 1892 to 1918. She was chairwoman for Fyrstikkarbeidernes fagforening from its establishment in 1889. She edited the magazine Kvinden from 1909. She was employed as a public film censor from 1913, as one of the two first film censor in Norway. She belonged to a network of female writers and critics, including Nini Roll Anker, Hulda Garborg and Sigrid Undset. In the 1880s she was politically active for the Liberal Party. She represented the Labour Party in Kristiania city council from 1910. As an Oslo politician she chaired the Park committee, and she worked for improving conditions for poor people, especially women and children. She was also preoccupied with education, and the Oslo domestic school (Norwegian: Oslo kommunale husmorskole) was established on her initiative.

She died in Barmen, Germany in 1920. A street in the borough Sagene in Oslo was named after her in 1923, and a memorial was put up in the Torshov Park in Oslo in 1931. A primary school in Storo/Oslo is named after her.
