= Ole Thomesen =

Norwegian jurist and politician

Ole Thomesen (12 November 1817 – 8 October 1905) was a Norwegian jurist and politician for the Liberal Party. A member of the Norwegian Parliament for five terms, he became known as a radical and liberal politician. He spent his professional career as a jurist working in various parts of Eastern Norway.

== Personal life ==
He was born in Kragerø as the son of merchant Claus Thomesen and his wife Inger Pedersen. His older brother Thomes Thomesen was a merchant and politician. Through him Ole Thomesen was an uncle of feminist, journalist and politician Fernanda Nissen. Another niece, painter Sophie Marie Stoltenberg Thomesen, married painter Erik Werenskiold. In March 1850 he married Johanne Jacobine Aalborg (1824–1893).

== Career ==
Ole Thomesen attended his early school in Kragerø, but then moved to Christiania, as he wanted an academic education instead of becoming a merchant. He took the examen artium in 1837 and the cand.jur. degree in 1843. Then, after half a year as a junior solicitor in Vågå Municipality he returned to Kragerø. However in 1848 he returned to Vågå as acting attorney. He was later a junior solicitor in Lillehammer Municipality before moving to Ringsaker Municipality in 1853 and Faaberg Municipality in 1855, where he worked as an attorney and farmer. He was also involved when a Norwegian-owned (as opposed to British-owned) steamship company trafficking the lake Mjøsa was established in 1853. As the company needed new ships, one of the ships that was ordered was Skibladner, and Thomesen personally signed the contract for building the ship. Built in Motala, Skibladner became operational in 1856, and is still in operation as of 2009. The encyclopedia Store norske leksikon reports that Skibladner is probably the second oldest paddle steamer in the world, behind the Romanian Tudor Vladimirescu.

In 1867 Thomesen returned to Kristiania. After two years as acting assessor in the city court, he got the position on a permanent basis in 1869. In February 1874 he was appointed as district stipendiary magistrate in Nedre Telemark. He resided at Gvarv. He was elected to the Norwegian Parliament from the constituency Bratsberg Amt in 1877, 1880, 1883, 1886 and 1889, since 1884 representing the Liberal Party. From 1883 he was a member of the Lagting. As such he was a candidate to participate in the Impeachment Court of 1883–1884, composed of Lagting members and Supreme Court Justices, but he was weeded out as the counsel for the defence took care to decline the candidatures of some of the more liberal and intellectual Lagting members. The aim was to put pressure on the remaining Lagting members, whom the conservatives called "the non-competent part of the court", but this did not succeed.

As a politician Thomesen was, already from an early age, more radical than party leader and Prime Minister Johan Sverdrup. He was a strong proponent of public saving, and advocated liberal rules of suffrage—for male citizens. He also supported separation of church and state, and opposed the religious influence in his party, proponents of which would later break out to form the more lay-Christian Moderate Liberal Party. Thomesen was also anti-Swedish Union. He advocated republicanist rule, citing that the head of the executive branch of government should be vested with constitutional responsibility, and be elected for his skills. However, he also advocated the parliamentary system with a weak executive branch compared to the legislature.

He eventually became an outspoken opponent of Prime Minister Johan Sverdrup, perceiving him as not radical enough. In December 1888 he hinted that Sverdrup was indirectly responsible for Ole Richter's suicide; as a result Thomesen was admonished through a Royal Resolution. He also antagonized other Liberal parliament members from his same constituency, notably Viggo Ullmann. Ultimately he was not re-elected for a sixth parliamentary term. He retired as a district stipendiary magistrate in August 1892, and moved to Sandvika. He died in eastern Bærum in October 1905.
