= Kapp Thor =

Headland of Hopen, Svalbard

- Cape
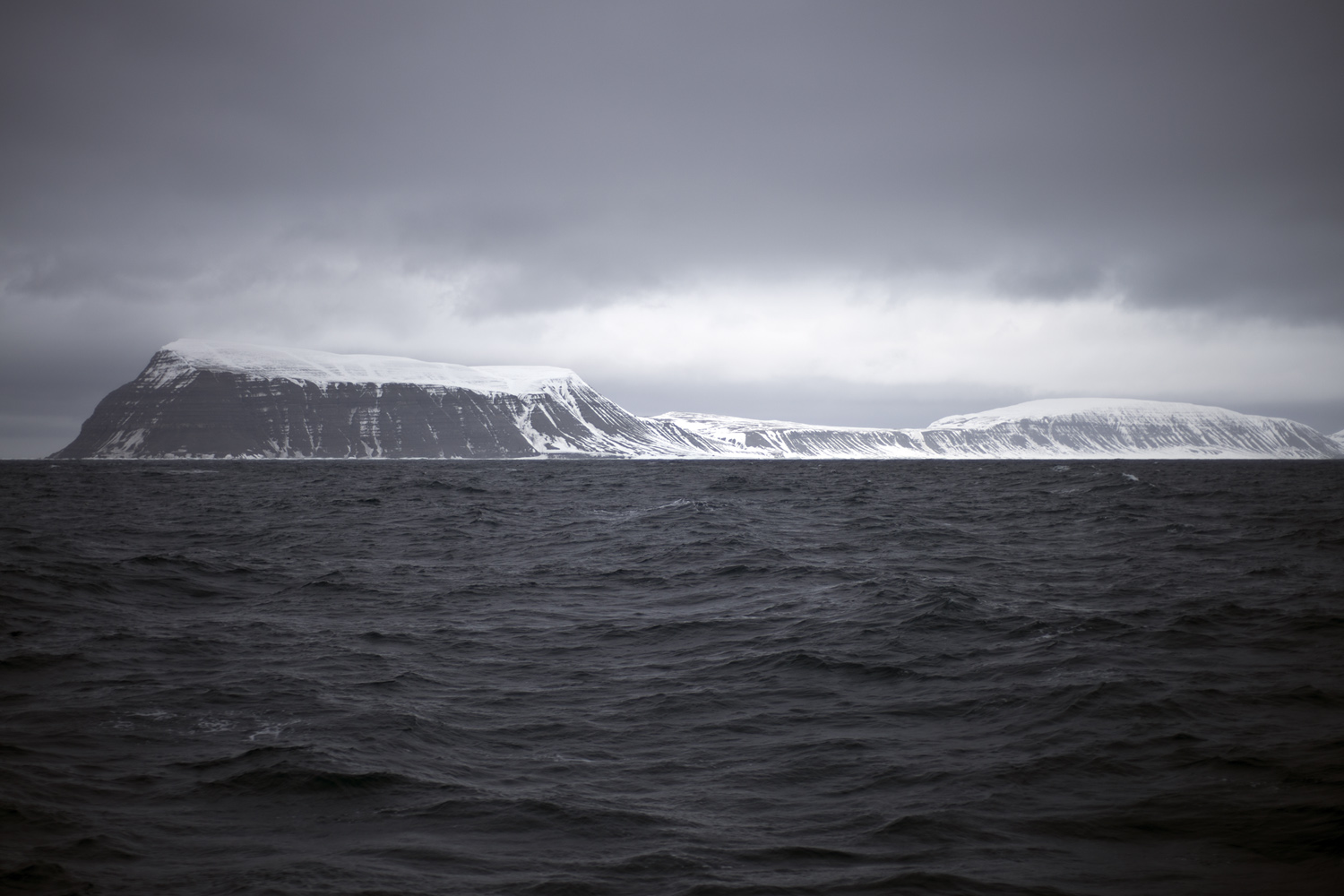
- Iversenfjellet and Kapp Thor viewed from the ship Lance.

- Coordinates: 76°26′38″N 24°56′19″E
- Location: Hopen, Svalbard, Norway

Kapp Thor is the southernmost point of Hopen in the Svalbard archipelago. It is named after fisheries advisor Thor Iversen.

== See also ==
- Beisaren – northernmost point of Hopen.
- Iversenfjellet; – also named after Thor Iversen.
