= Kollerfjellet =

Mountain in Svalbard, Norway

Coordinates: 76°32′12″N 25°03′15″E

Kollerfjellet is a mountain at Hopen, Svalbard. It has a height of 304 m.a.s.l., and its first known ascent was made in 1924 during topographic works.

The meteorological station Hopen Radio is located between Kollerfjellet and Werenskioldfjellet.
