= Beisaren =

Headland of Hopen, Svalbard

Coordinates: 76.7150°N 25.4944°E

Beisaren is the northernmost point of the island of Hopen in the Svalbard archipelago. It is named after hunter Berner Jørgensen, whose nickname was "Beisaren".

== See also ==
- Kapp Thor – southernmost point of Hopen.
