= Thor Iversen =

Thor Iversen (1873–1953) was a Norwegian advisor to the Board of Fisheries. From 1923 he was in charge of the inspection of hunting and fishing in the Arctic Ocean. Among his books are Drivis og selfangst from 1927, and Ishavsøya Hopen from 1941.

The highest mountain of Hopen is called Iversenfjellet, and the southernmost point of the island is called Kapp Thor, both named after him.
