= Werenskioldfjellet =

Mountain in Svalbard, Norway

Coordinates: 76.499°N 24.962°E

Werenskioldfjellet is a mountain at Hopen, Svalbard. The mountain is named after Norwegian geologist and Arctic explorer Werner Werenskiold.

The meteorological station Hopen Radio is located between Werenskioldfjellet and Kollerfjellet. In 1978 there was an incident when a Soviet Tupolev Tu-16 aircraft accidentally crashed at the sides of Werenskioldfjellet.
