= Iversenfjellet =

Highest mountain of Hopen, Svalbard, Norway

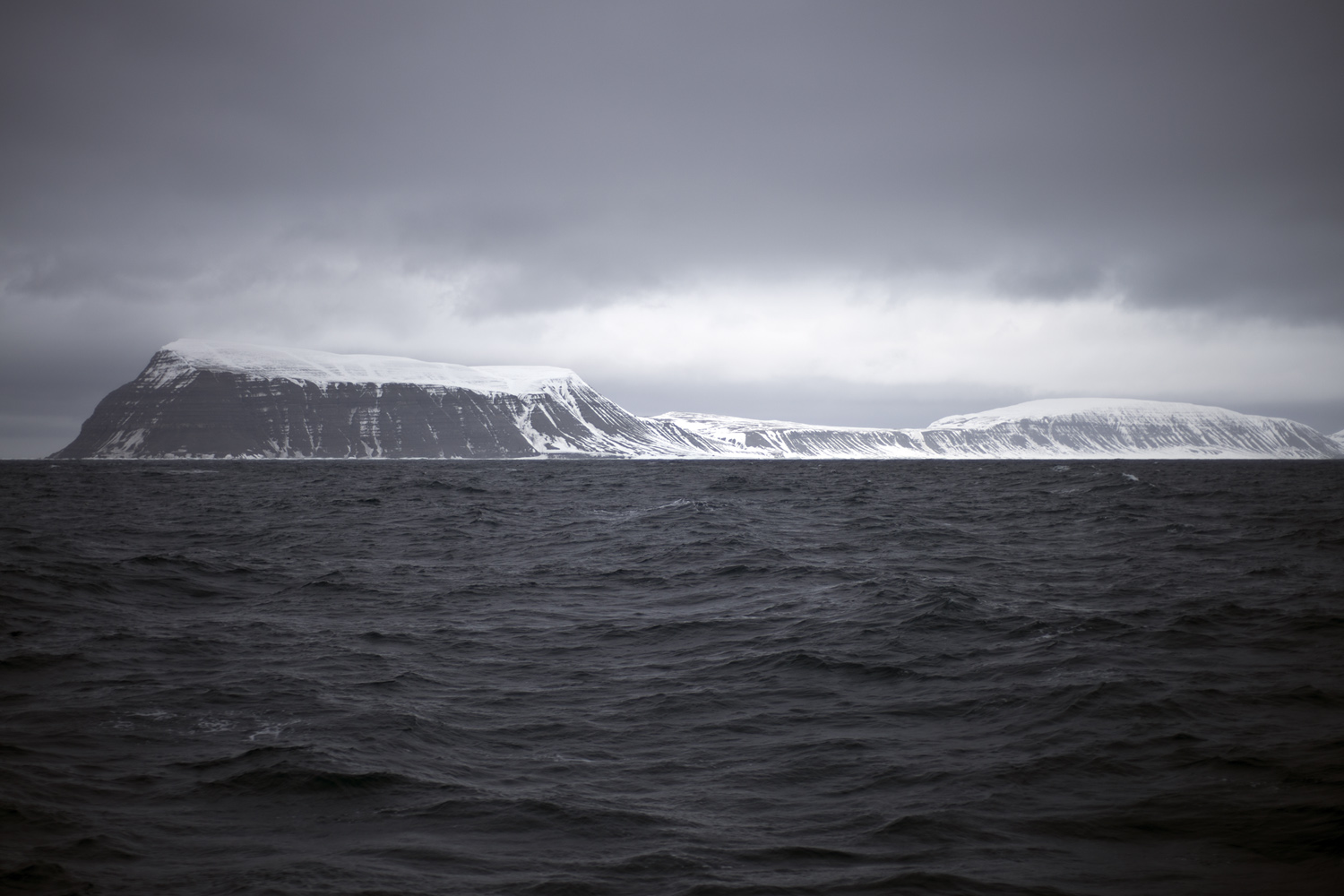
- Iversenfjellet and Kapp Thor viewed from the ship Lance.

Highest point
- Elevation: 371 m (1,217 ft)
- Coordinates: 76°27′15″N 24°55′36″E

Geography
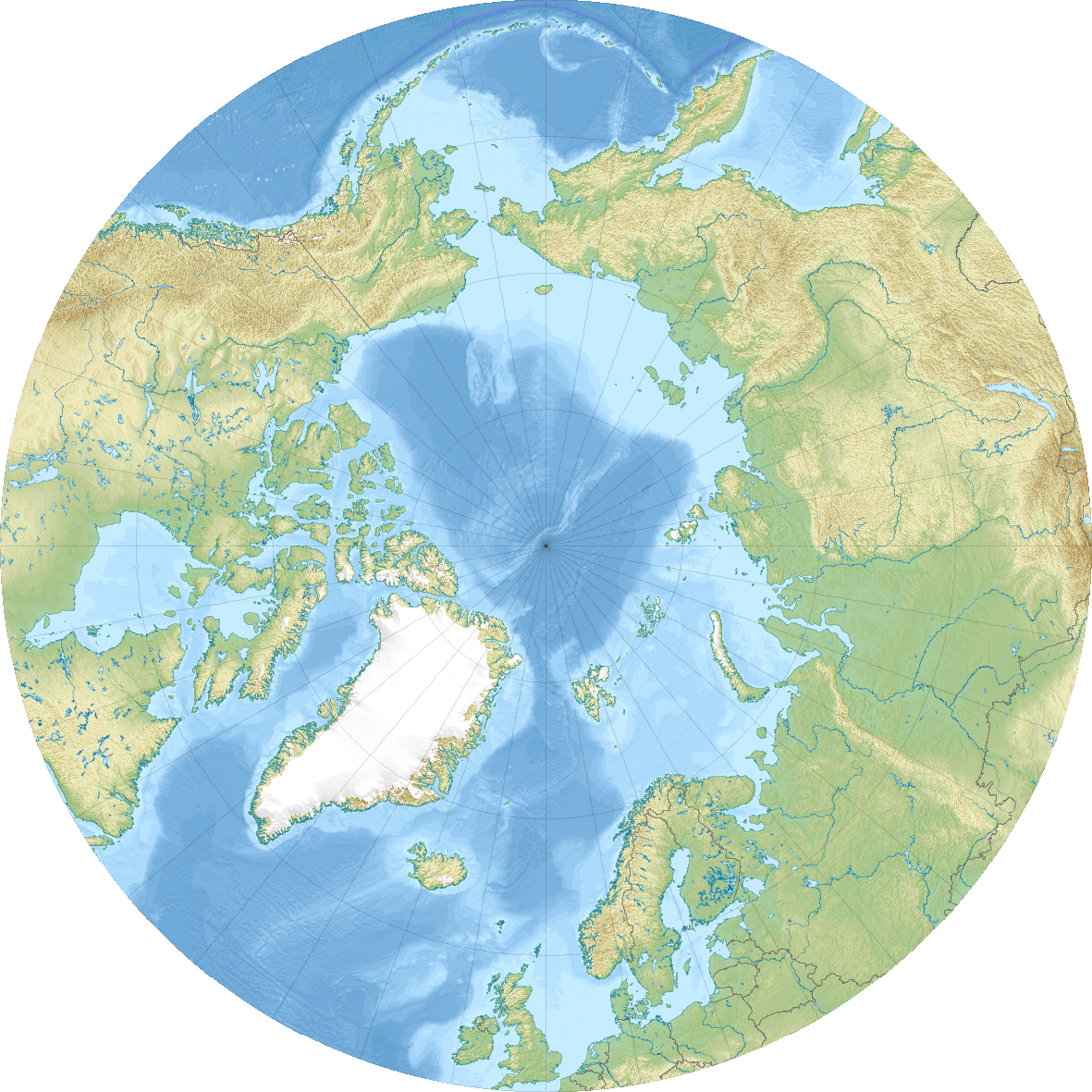
- Location within Svalbard Location within Arctic
- Location: Hopen, Svalbard, Norway

Iversenfjellet is the highest mountain of Hopen in the Svalbard archipelago. It has a height of 371 m.a.s.l. and is located at the southern portion of Hopen. The mountain is named after fisheries consultant Thor Iversen.

== See also ==
- Kapp Thor – the southernmost point of Hopen, was also named after Thor Iversen.
