= Mecklenburg (Dano-Norwegian family) =

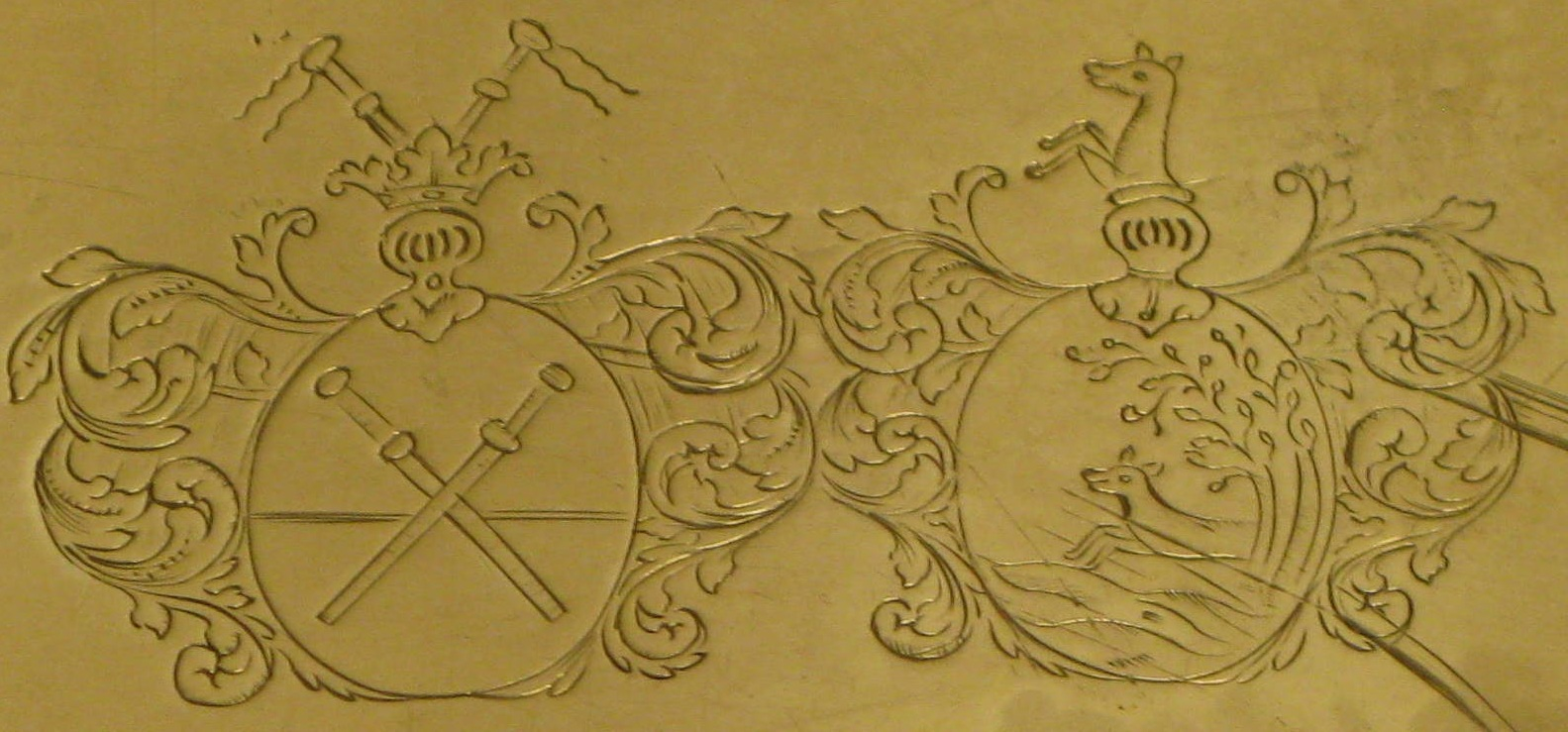
Coat of arms of Captain Niels Mechlenburg (right). Heraldic artwork from 1763 in the Sykkylven Church.

Mecklenburg, Mechlenborg, and Mikkelborg is a patrician and historically a prominent family living in Denmark and Norway. They descend from Flensburg in today's Germany. Members include Willum Mecklenburg, Feudal Lord of Eiker, as well as several regional bailiffs, militaries, and privileged merchants. The family is closely related to families of the Danish and the Norwegian nobility, and among cognatic descendants of the family are the Counts of Wedel-Jarlsberg.

== Name and coat of arms ==
The name has appeared with various orthography and pronunciation, the most important being Mecklenburg, Mechlenborg, and (in Northern Norway) Mikkelborg.

The arms are a wild dog running out of a forest [three trees]. The crest is the same dog rampant. The arms have natural colours.

== General history ==
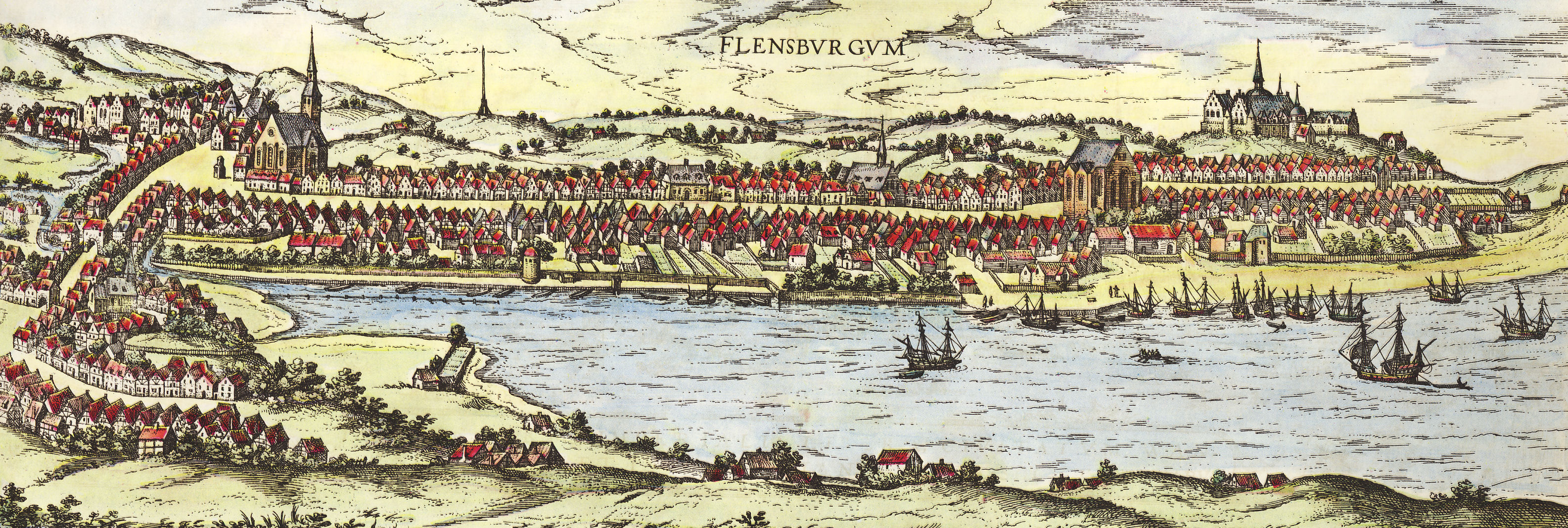
Flensburg (between 1572 and 1618).

As a young man Oluf Jensen (b. ca. 1487 in Flensburg) came to the town of Haderslev, where he became a merchant and within short time very wealthy. He married Margrethe Meckelburg, the sister of Henrick Meckelburg, Mayor of Flensburg. Also Jensen himself became this town's mayor. Jensen adopted the name of his first wife, calling himself Oluf Meckelburg. This name was also given to or taken by his children of both marriages.

In his marriage with Marina Jacobsdatter Oldendorph, a daughter of Jacob Oldendorph, Mayor of Haderslev, and Elisabeth Holst, Oluf Mecklenburg had the son Oluf Meckelburg (b. 1540). Alike his father Oluf the younger became a merchant;—not in his birth town but in that of his father, Flensburg. He became one of the wealthiest merchant in that town. He traded and exported goods from the royal fiefs (Sleswick and Holsatia), and he had extensive connections to Norway. He married Margrethe Carstensdatter, who belonged to the rural nobility of the region. Her parents were Carsten Rickertsen, Mayor of Flensburg, and Marina Friis af Arlevad (Arlewatt).

Their sons Jacob and Oluf Mechlenborg went to Norway, where they became Bailiff of Nordmøre and Bailiff of Helgeland, respectively. Their third son, Carsten Mechlenborg, remained in Haderslev, where he was a merchant and also the town's mayor. On the other hand, many of the latter's children moved to Eastern Norway.

== Mecklenburg in Eastern Norway ==
Customs and export secretary Oluf Carstensen Mechlenborg had two sons: Niels Olufsen Mechlenburg, an estate owner, and Willum Mecklenburg, Feudal Lord of Eiker (one of the last in Norway). The two brothers' descendants were married into and have descendants in several families of Danish and the Norwegian nobility, among others Werenskiold, von Rømer, de Tonsberg, Huitfeldt, von Hausmann, and the Counts of Wedel-Jarlsberg, as well as in non-noble families like Hansten, Hiorth, and Angell.

== Mecklenburg in Western Norway ==
Jacob Olufsen Mechlenborg (ca. 1565–1619) was appointed as Bailiff of Nordmøre. His wife was Maren Mikkelsdatter, and the couple had three known sons: (1) Oluf Jacobsen Mechlenborg, Bailiff of Nordmøre and a customs and export officer, (2) Niels Jacobsen Mechlenborg, and (3) Johan Jacobsen Mechlenborg.

== Mecklenburg in Northern Norway ==
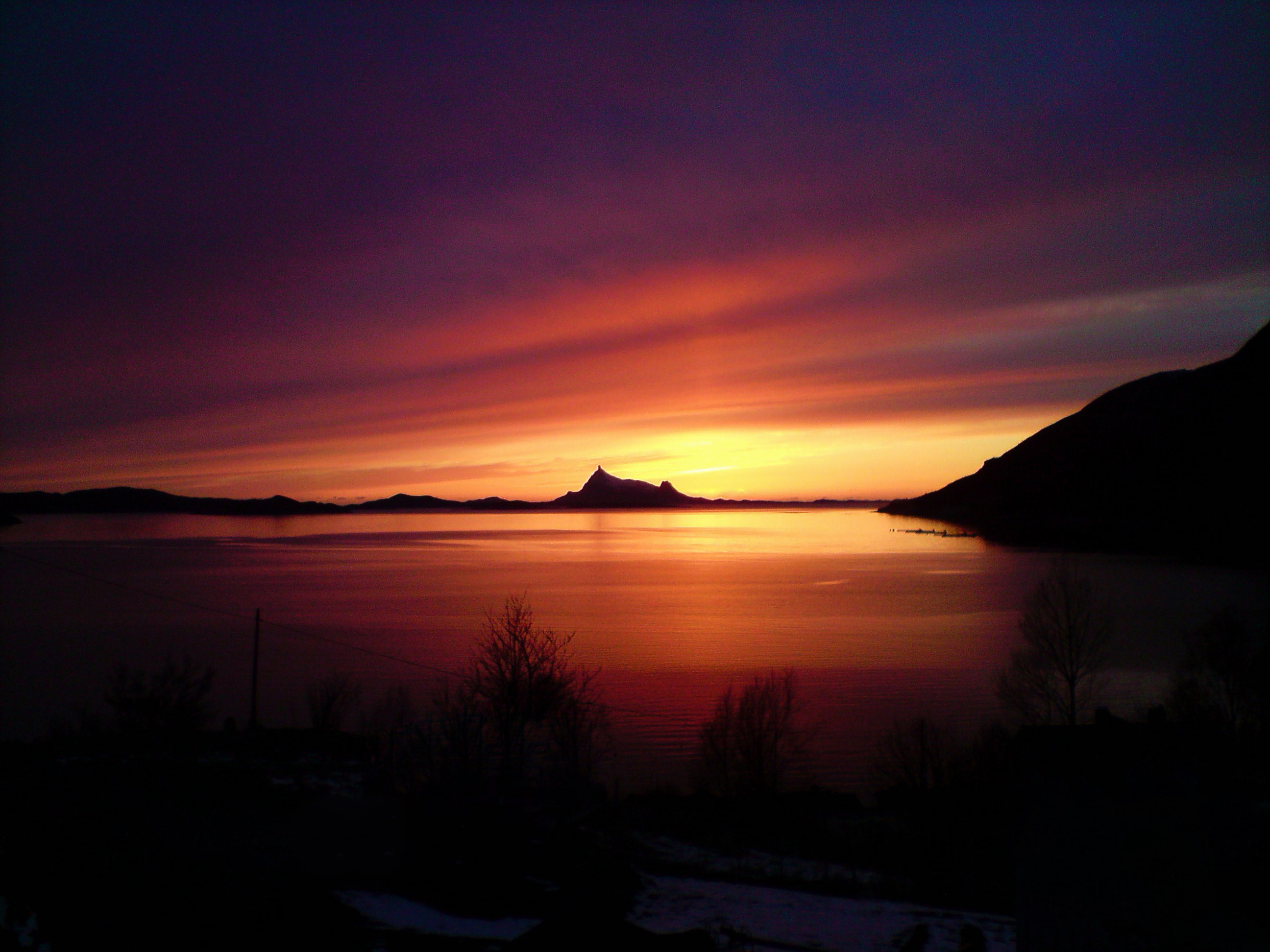
Hestmannøy alias Hestmona, seat of the younger line.

Jens Mechlenborg was Bailiff of Helgeland (yellow and green), and his son Oluf Mechlenborg was Bailiff of Lofoten and Vesterålen (red).

=== The older line ===
Jens Olufsen Mechlenborg (ca. 1566–1626) came to Trondheim in Norway in 1601 or 1602. His occupation during the first years is not known. It is likely that he worked together with merchants who were or had been partners of his father and his grandfather. Between 1606 and 1619 he was Bailiff of Helgeland, in which office he was succeeded by Peter Jacobsen Falch.

His son Oluf Jensen Mechlenburg became Bailiff of Lofoten and Vesterålen. Between 1640 and 1644 he was Bailiff of Helgeland together with Mathias Gregersen Lehmb. In 1665 he was living at Lurøy Farm. He was married with Adelus Christensdatter (Schanche), a daughter of Lord Christen Olufsen (Schanche), priest of Brønnøy Church.

Only the son Christen Mechlenborg (ca. 1640–ca. 1710) is known, and he remained living on Lurøy. His daughter Eva Mechlenborg (ca. 1680–1762), who took over Lurøy, was married to Kristen Hansen, a shipper at Hestmannøy.

=== The younger line ===
The older line ended with Eva Mechlenborg. All her children assumed the name Mechlenborg and thereby established the younger line. As the family no longer were high officials, members began engaging themselves with trade and shipping, then a royal privilege.

== Literature ==
- Mørkvig, Svend Aage (1986): Mechlenburg : Patricierslægt gennem 500 år (English: Mechlenburg : A Patrician Family through 500 Years)
- Norsk biografisk leksikon: Mats De Tonsberg at snl.no.
