= Hopen Radio =

Coast radio station in Norway

Coordinates: 76°30.6′N 25°0.8′E

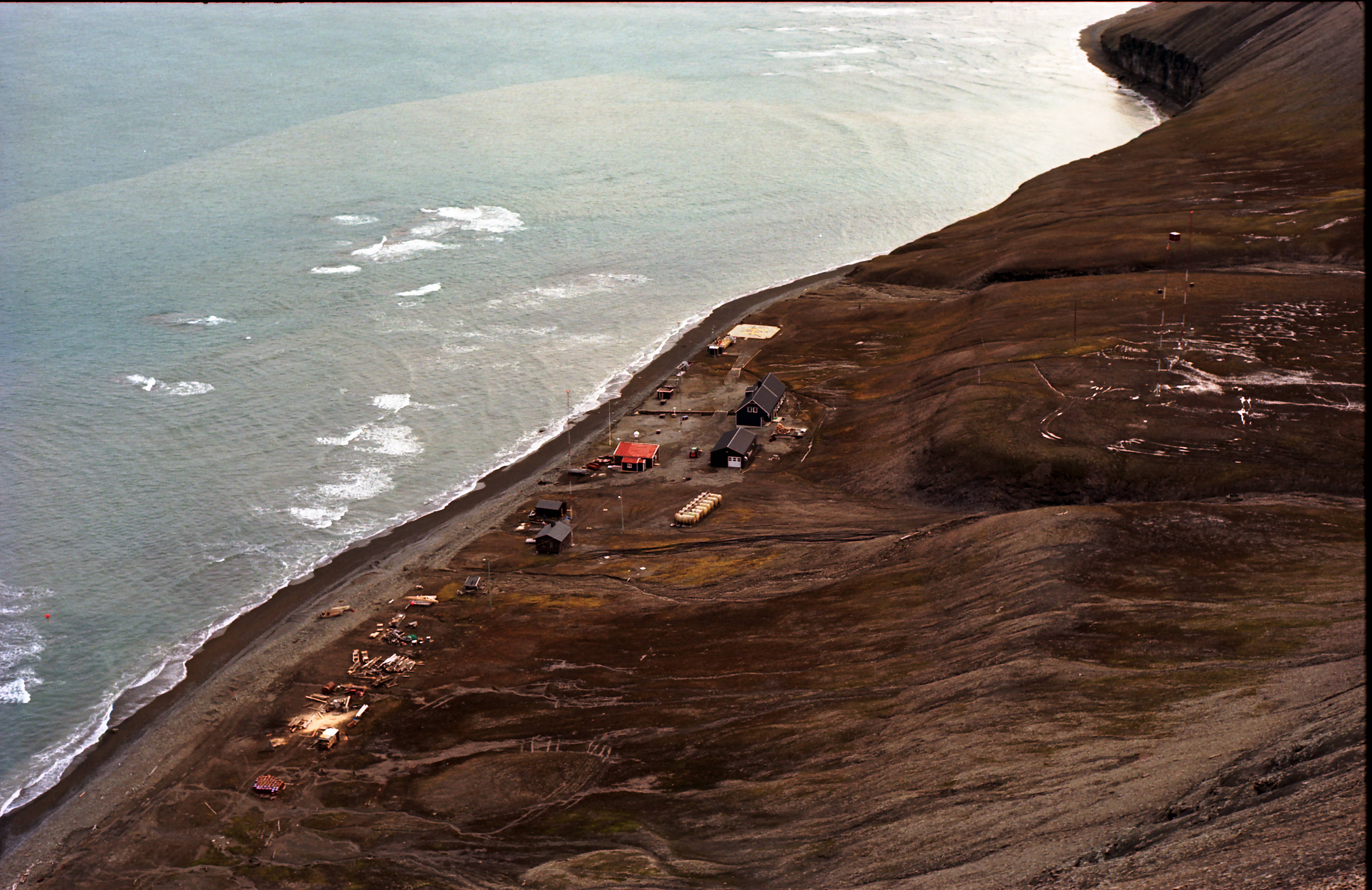
Hopen Radio

Hopen Radio is a coast radio station and the only settlement on the island of Hopen in Svalbard, Norway. It is located between Kollerfjellet and Werenskioldfjellet.

The station was established by Germany as part of Operation Zitronella during the Second World War. After the war, it was taken over by the Norwegian Meteorological Institute. It has a staff of four people.

On 28 August 1978 an early model Tupolev Tu-16 of the Soviet Air Force crashed on the island. All seven crew were killed in the accident. It was discovered two days later by the four-man Norwegian weather forecasting team. The Soviet Union refused to admit the loss of an aircraft until the bodies of the crew were given to them. Norway transcribed the contents of the flight recorder over the objections of the Soviet government.
