= Husmorskole =

Norway's home economics schools (Norwegian: Husmorskoler), or technical schools for domestic arts (Norwegian: fagskoler i husstell) arose at the end of the 19th century for the purpose of providing specialized instruction in domestic subjects. The first husmorskole school in Norway was established in 1865, on Abildsø farm in Østre Aker, by Minna Wetlesen. The schools developed in parallel with agricultural schools (Norwegian: landbruksskoler) and were intended to teach food preparation and housework. Later these home economics schools were also established in Norway's cities. The schools in the countryside were generally governed by county councils (Norwegian: fylkeskommuner) and town schools by municipal governments.

In the 1960s, the home economics schools were renamed as technical schools for domestic arts (fagskoler i husstell). The schools were not regulated by law before the secondary education law (Lov om videregående opplæring) came into effect in 1974. The home economics schools then became a part of the secondary education program, on an equal footing with gymnasiums (university preparation schools) and practical and professional schools (yrkeskoler) specializing in business and technical programs. Following the 1976 secondary education law, the gymnasiums were consolidated with the practical and professional schools into a unified secondary education system. Nowadays, instruction in restaurant work, food and nutrition is offered as a program discipline within Norway's overall secondary education program.
