= Werner Werenskiold =

Norwegian geologist and geographer

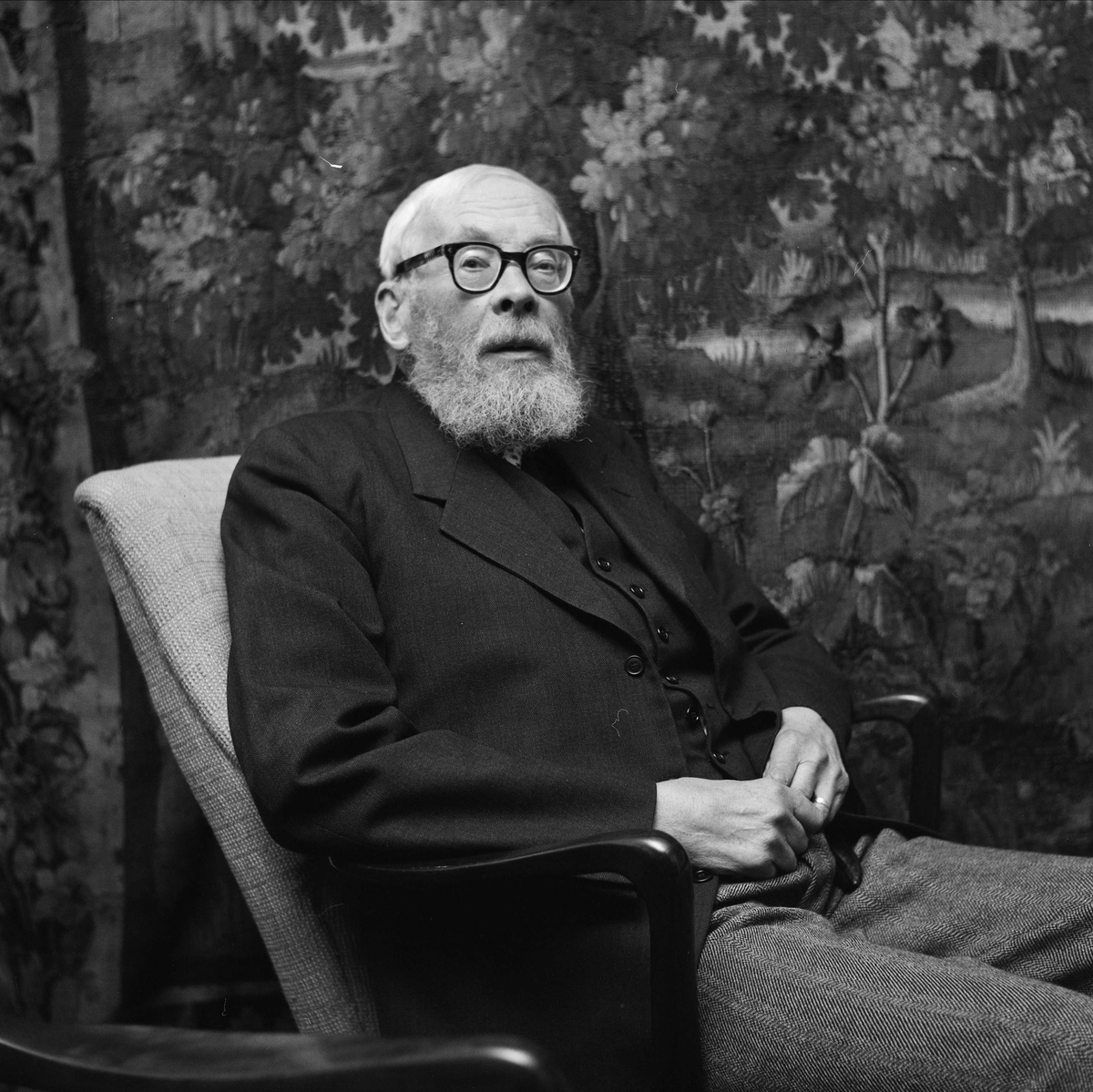
- Werner Werenskiold in 1958
- Born: 28 April 1883; Paris, France
- Died: 2 August 1961 (aged 78); Bærum, Akershus
- Spouse(s): 1: 1910-41, Ingeborg Leuch Elieson (1884-1960), 2: 1942-61, Bergljot Qviller (1903-1996)
- Scientific career
- Fields: Quaternary geology and Geography
- Institutions: University of Oslo; Yale University; University of Bergen

Werner Werenskiold (28 April 1883 – 2 August 1961) was a Norwegian geologist and geographer.

== Personal life ==
Born in Paris on 28 April 1883, Werenskiold was a son of painter and illustrator Erik Werenskiold and visual artist Sophie Marie Stoltenberg Thomesen (1849–1926). He was a brother of Dagfin Werenskiold, and a nephew of Fernanda Nissen.

He was married twice. He first married Ingeborg Leuch Elieson, from 1910 to 1941, and then married Bergljot Qviller in 1942.

== Career ==
Werenskiold made field studies in Telemark and Gudbrandsdalen in his younger days, and later focused on studies at Svalbard and of glaciers in Jotunheimen. He was the principal editor of the two-volume series Norge, vårt land (1936 – 1941) and the book series Jorden vår klode. He was a professor of geography at the University of Oslo from 1925.

He lived and died in Bærum, and was on the election ballot for the Liberal People's Party (formerly the Liberal Left Party) in the 1930s.

The mountain of Werenskioldfjellet at Hopen, Svalbard is named after him. The glacier of Werenskioldbreen in Wedel Jarlsberg Land, Svalbard is also named after him.

== Bibliography (in selection) ==
- Text to geological map of the region between Sætersdalen and Ringerike, Norges geologiske undersøkelse no. 66, 1912
- Norges fysiske og økonomiske geografi for gymnasiet (sm.m. E. Haffner), 1912 (8'th issue 1936)
- Tekst til geologisk oversiktskart over det sydlige Norge. Maalestok 1:1 000 000, Norges geologiske undersøkelse no. 70, 1914, pp. 13–35
- Mean Monthly Air Transport over the North Pacific Ocean, dr.avh., Geofysiske Publikasjoner, vol. 2 no. 9, 1922
- Fysisk geografi, 2 bd., 1925–43 (issue 1: Geofysikk, meteorologi, oseanografi, 1925, bd. 2: Landkarter, landjordens form, 1943)
- Geografi, tiltredelsesforelesning, in NGT 1927, pp. 1–9
- Jorden, dets land og folk, 2 bd., 1931–34
- Norge vårt land, 2 bd., 1936–41 (4'th issue in 3 bd., 1957)
- Jord, vann, luft, ild. Fysisk geografi for hvermann, 1952
- Jorden vår klode (sm.m. T. Width), 2 bd., 1956
