= Lars Holst =

Norwegian journalist, newspaper editor and politician

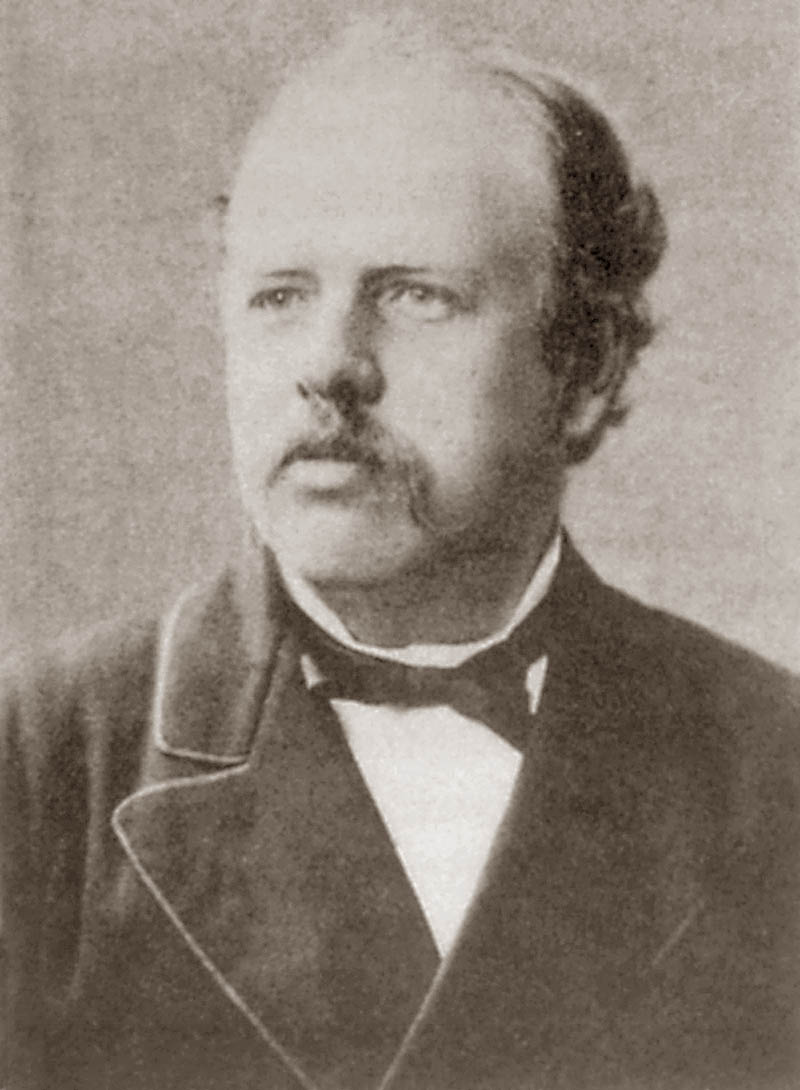
- Born: 22 November 1848; Bergen
- Died: 31 May 1915 (aged 66)
- Occupations: Journalist; Newspaper editor Politician
- Known for: Editor-in-chief of Dagbladet; Chairman of the Liberal Party of Norway
- Spouse: Fernanda Thomesen

Lars Kristian Holst (22 November 1848 – 31 May 1915) was a Norwegian journalist, newspaper editor and politician.

== Biography ==
Holst was born in Bergen, Norway. He was the son of shipmaster Søren Dalholt Holst (1811–84) and Catharina Krohn (1814–1903). He graduated from the University of Christiania (now University of Oslo) and earned his law degree in 1871. In 1872, he moved to Bergen and worked for Bergens Tidende from 1874. In 1883, he was made Chief editor of Dagbladet. He was editor-in-chief of Dagbladet from 1883 to 1898 and Chairman of the Liberal Party of Norway from 1900 to 1903. In 1884 he was a co-founder of the Norwegian Association for Women's Rights.

== Personal life ==
He was a nephew of Henrik Krohn. Through his sister Christine Margrethe, he was a brother-in-law of Nils Wichstrøm. He was married to journalist Fernanda Thomesen from 1882 to 1895. Lars Holst died in 1915 and was buried in the churchyard of Old Aker Church in Oslo.

Media offices
| Preceded by Samuel Frederik Bætzmann | Chief editor of Dagbladet; 1883–1898 | Succeeded by Harald Kristoffersen |
Party political offices
| Preceded by Viggo Ullmann | Chairman of the Liberal Party; 1900–1903 | Succeeded by Carl Berner |
