= Erik Werenskiold =

Norwegian artist (1855–1938)

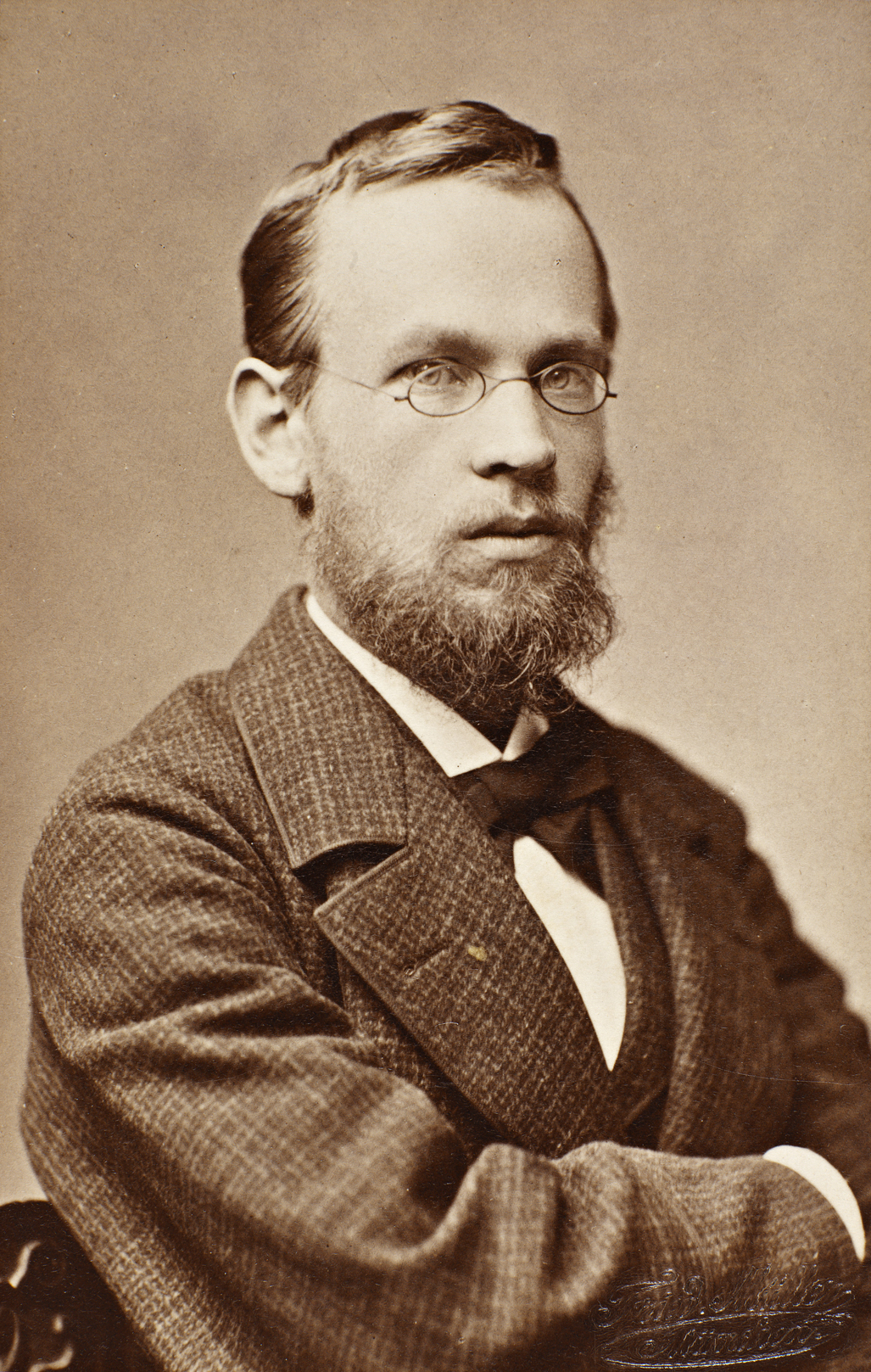
Erik Werenskiold in 1880

Erik Theodor Werenskiold (11 February 1855 – 23 November 1938) was a Norwegian painter and illustrator. He is especially known for his drawings for the Asbjørnsen and Moe collection of Norske Folkeeventyr, and his illustrations for the Norwegian edition of the Snorri Sturlason Heimskringla.

== Background ==
Erik Theodor Werenskiold was born in Eidskog, at Granli gaard, southeast of Kongsvinger in Hedmark county, Norway. He lived his first four years there with his family, until they moved to Kongsvinger. Werenskiold grew up in Kongsvinger Fortress as the fourth son of the commander. He attended the Kongsvinger national school and then in the three years 1869-72 was at the privately owned Latin school operated by Harald Aars and Peter Voss (Aars og Voss' skole) in Christiania.

Based on advice from the painter Adolph Tidemand, he attended a college for painters. During 1873, he was a pupil of Norwegian sculptor, Julius Middelthun (1820–1886), at the Drawing School in Christiania (Tegneskolen i Kristiania). He studied for a short time at the studio of artist, Axel Ender in the autumn of 1875.

== Career ==
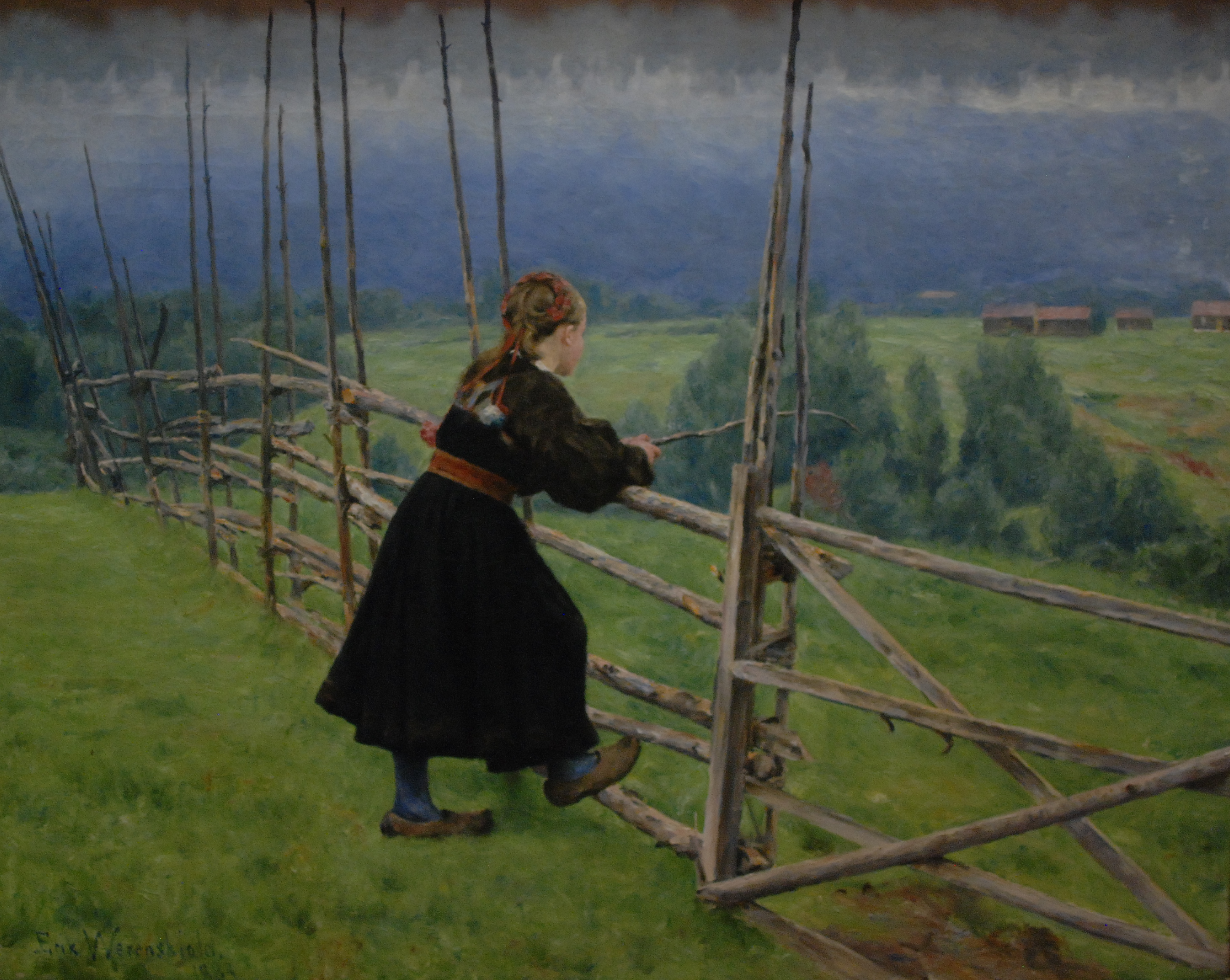
On the Plain (1883)

He went to Munich where he stayed for four years. His meeting with the French plein air painting, particularly Charles-François Daubigny, at a French art show in Munich in 1879, convinced Werenskiold of its superiority over the German studio painting. In the spring of 1880, Werenskiold was paralyzed in the right arm. After half a year of hospitalization and recreation in Switzerland at Oberbayern and Tyrol, he finally regained his health. From 1881 to 1883 he lived in Paris. In 1883, Werenskiold returned to Norway where he spent the summers in Telemark. He returned to France in 1884–1885 and studied with Léon Bonnat (1888–89). In the spring of 1895 he made a study trip to Rome and Florence.

He made several paintings of peasants in landscapes. Illustrations for Norwegian fairy tales had interested him since his time in Munich, and he now got the opportunity to illustrate Norwegian fairy tales together with Theodor Kittelsen. He illustrated Norwegian folktales (Norske Folkeeventyr) in 1879 and continued with Adventure Tales for Children (Eventyrbog for Børn. Norske Folkeeventyr) by Asbjørnsen and Moe in three volumes during the period 1882–1887. Werenskiold illustrated a new edition of King's Sagas (kongesagae) from Snorre Sturlason and The Family at Gilje (Familjen paa Gilje) (1903) by Jonas Lie.

His wide range of characterized portraits make up an entire pantheon of famous Norwegians from his lifetime. Werenskiold received the Norwegian national artist's salary from 1908. He was appointed Knight of the Royal Norwegian Order of St. Olav in 1890, Commander 1905, Commander of the 1st class of 1930 and the Grand Cross 1935. He was also Commander of the Order of the Dannebrog. He died in Bærum Municipality in Akershus county, Norway. He was buried at Vår Frelsers gravlund in Oslo.

== Personal life ==
He was married to the painter Sophie Marie Stoltenberg Thomesen (1849–1926). He was the brother-in-law of journalist Fernanda Nissen and the son–in-law of Norwegian merchant and politician Thomes Thomesen. He was the father of geologist Werner Werenskiold (1883–1961) and sculptor Dagfin Werenskiold (1892–1977).

== Selected works ==
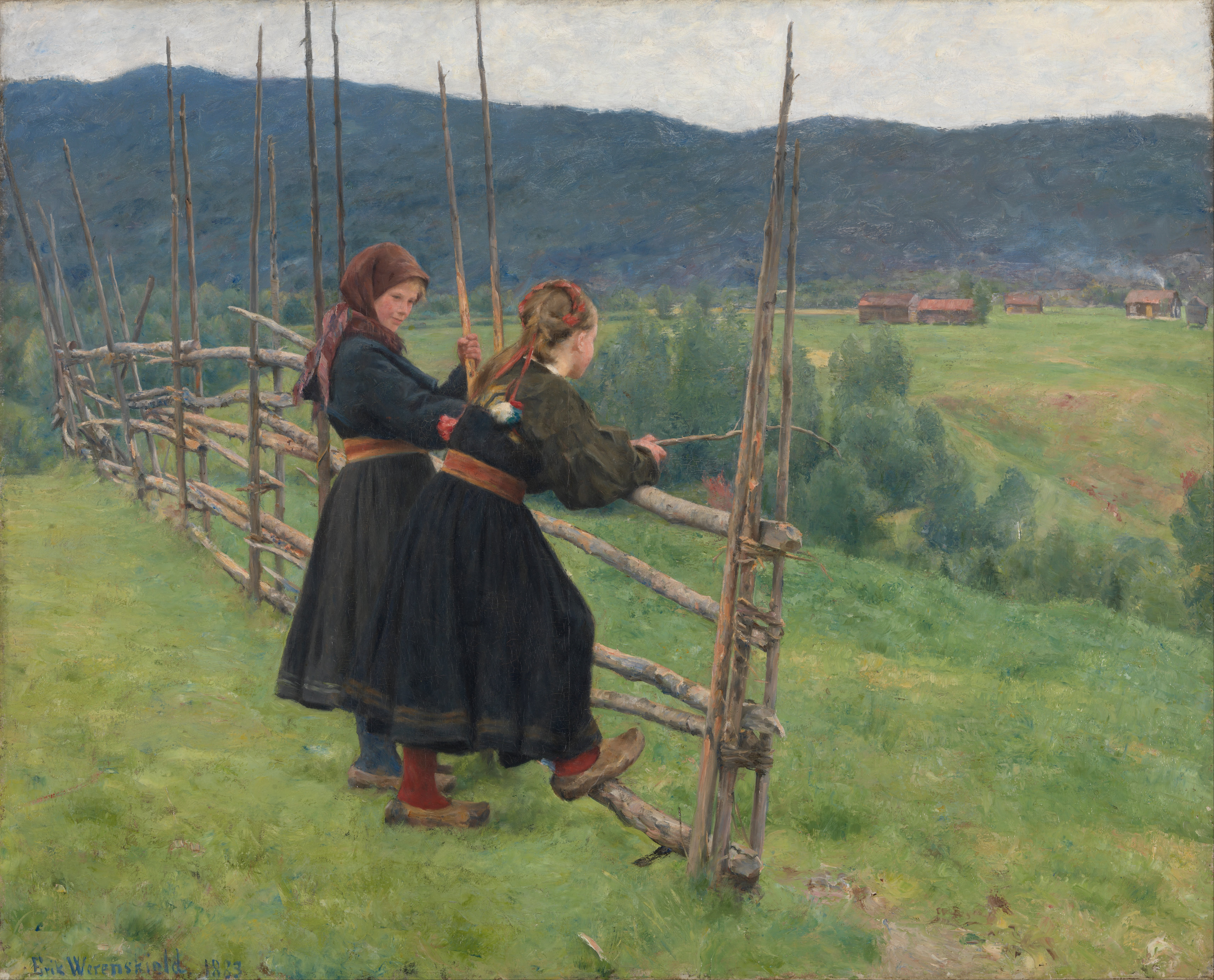
September (1883)

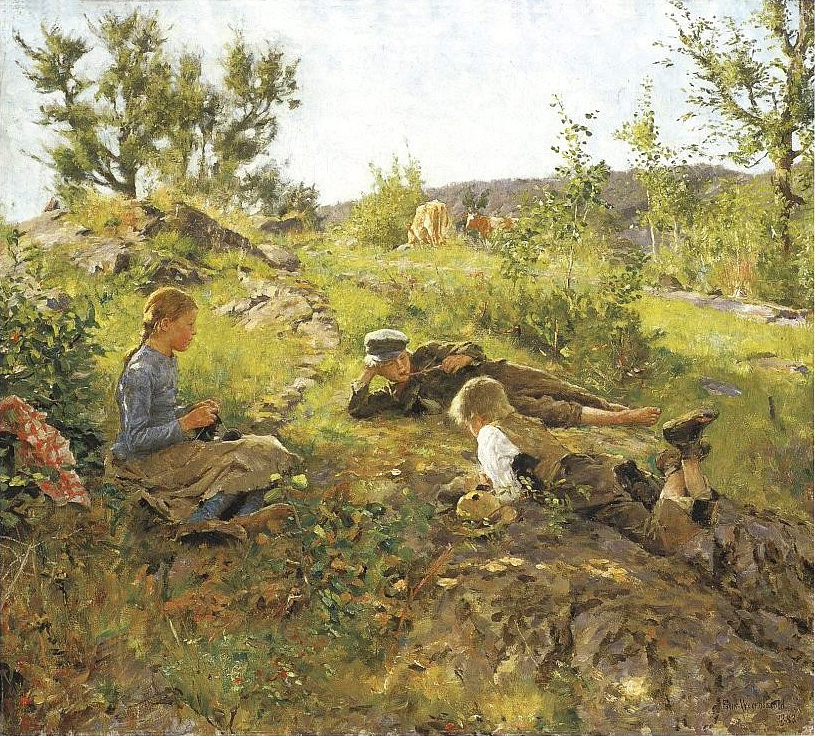
Shepherds at Tåtøy (1883)

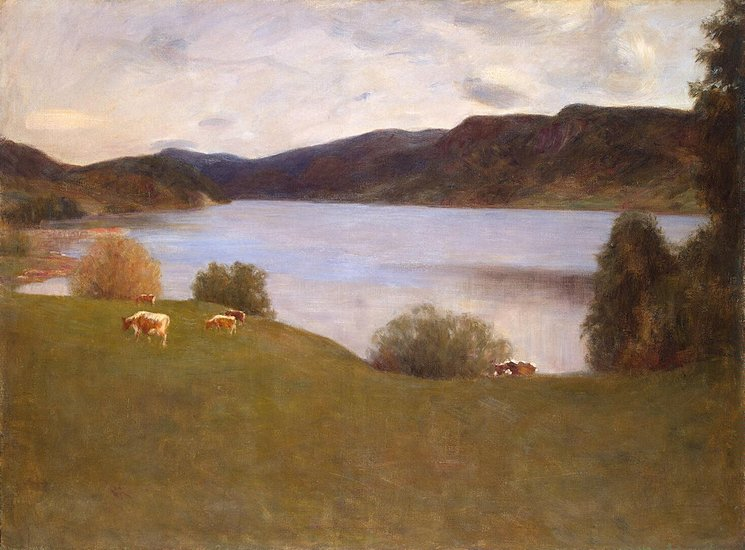
Landscape with a Lake (1895)

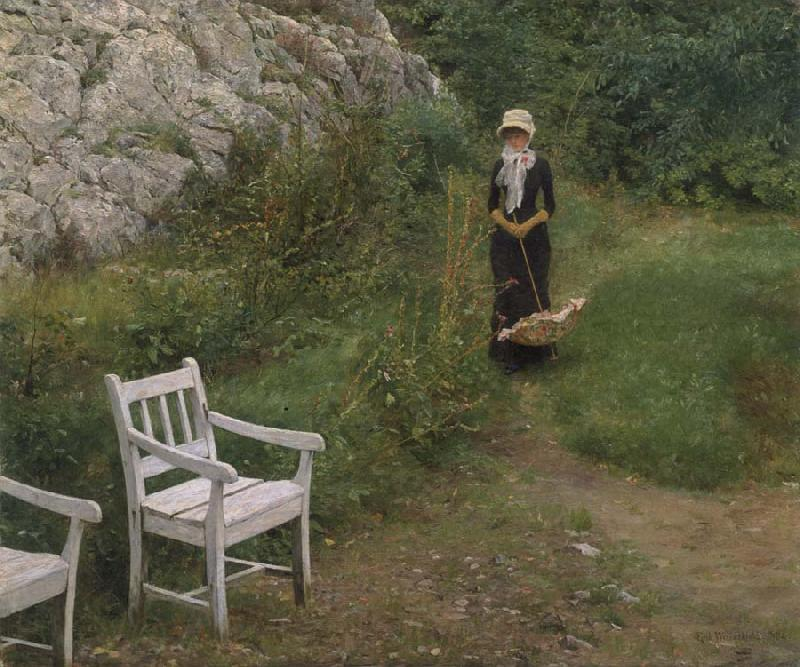
In Family Surroundings (c.1900)

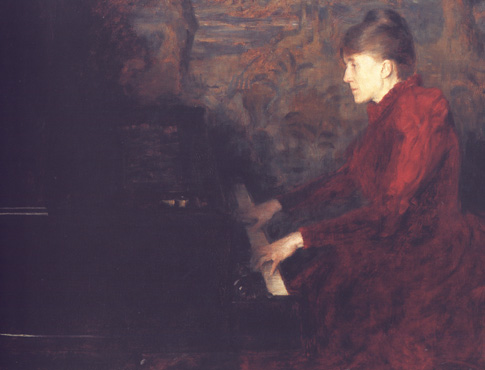
Portrait of Erika Nissen (1892)

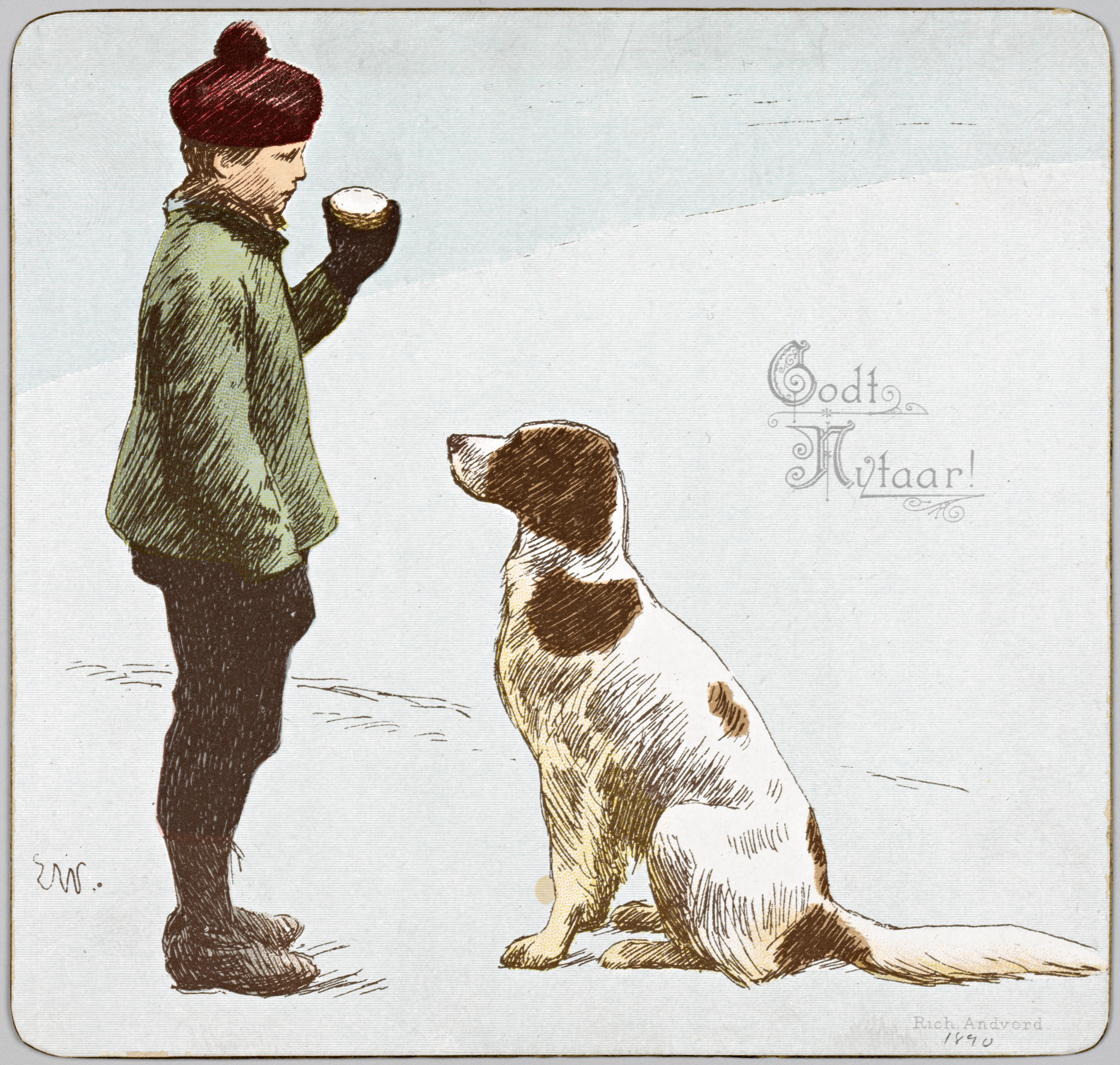
Godt Nytaar! (Happy New Year, 1890)

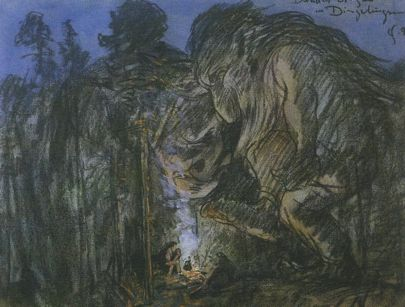
Trolls (1895)

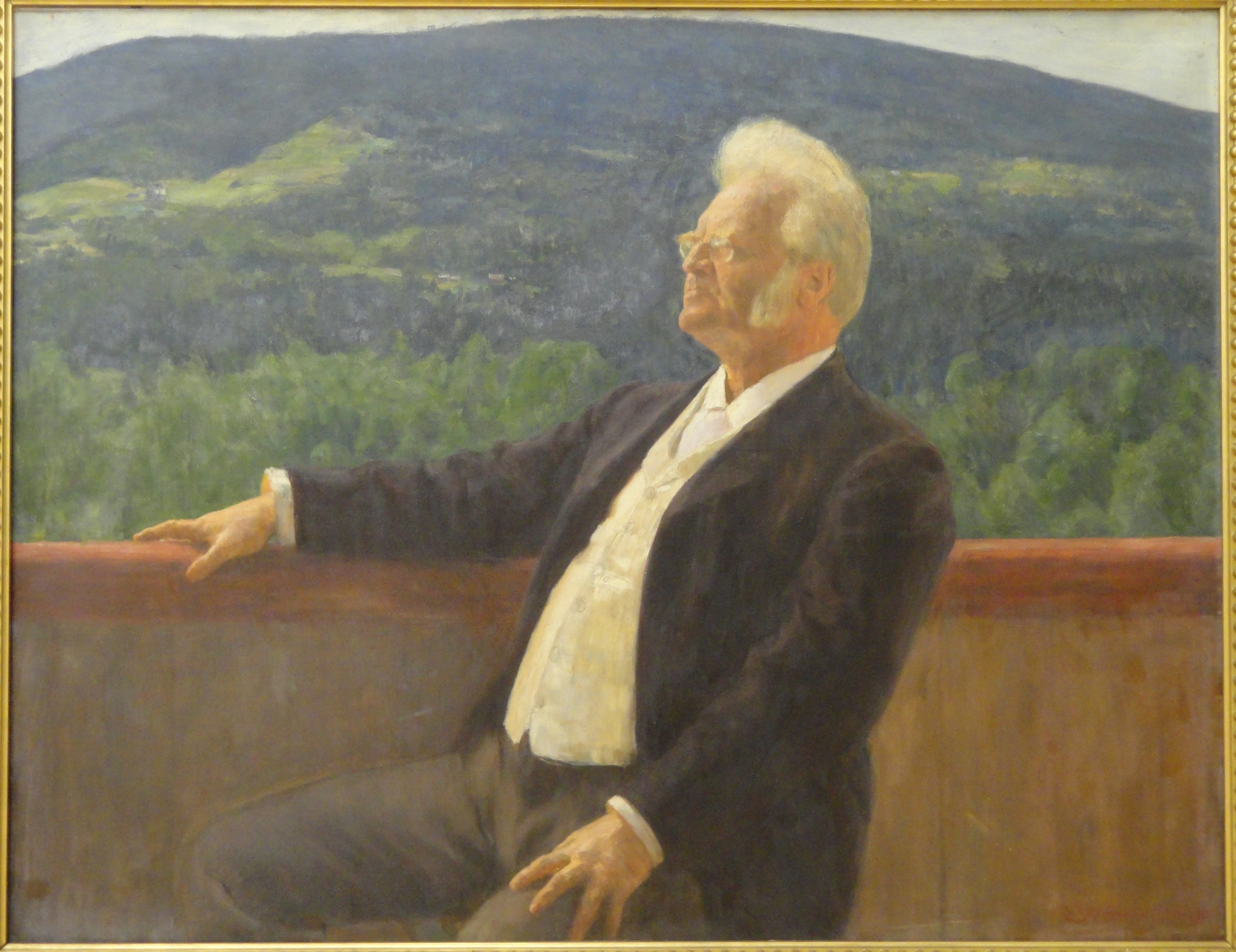
Portrait of Bjørnstjerne Bjørnson (1895)

=== Visual art ===
- Bærrensere (1878)
- Et møte (1880)
- Gjetere (1882)
- En bondebegravelse (1883–85)
- Olivia (1891)
- Solstreif (1891)
- Lekende barn (1892)
- Sommeraften i Kviteseid (1893)
- Skysshesten (1894)
- Aftenlandskap fra Kviteseid (1895)
- Hungersnøden (1923 and 1928–29)
- Middagsselskapet (1928–30)
- En streikebryter ca. (1930)

=== Portraits ===
- Gunnar Heiberg (1878)
- Amund Helland (1885)
- Kitty Kielland (1891)
- Edvard Grieg (1892 and 1902)
- Erika Nissen (1892)
- Fridtjof Nansen (1893)
- Frederik Collett (1894)
- Bjørnstjerne Bjørnson (1895)
- Henrik Ibsen (1895)
- Eva Nansen (1896)
- Sophus Lie (1902)
- Christian Michelsen (1906)

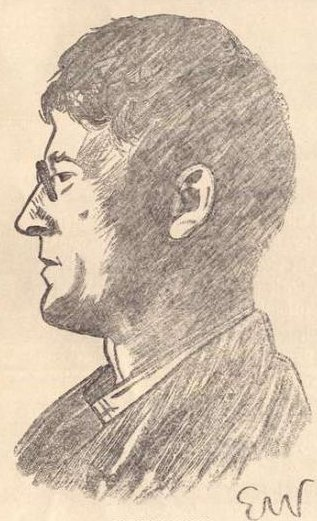
Knut Hamsun
(1889)

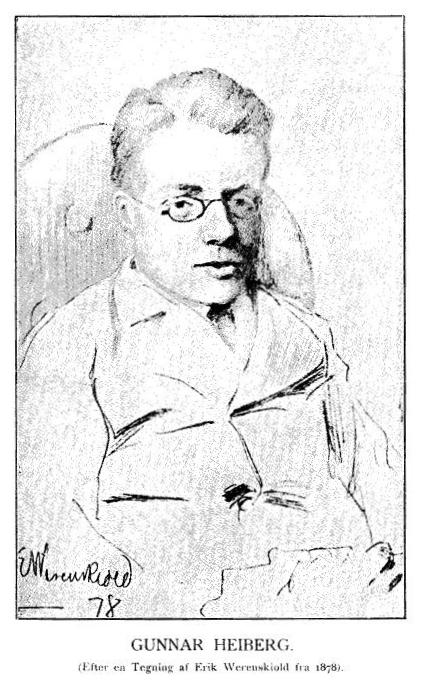
Gunnar Heiberg
(1878)

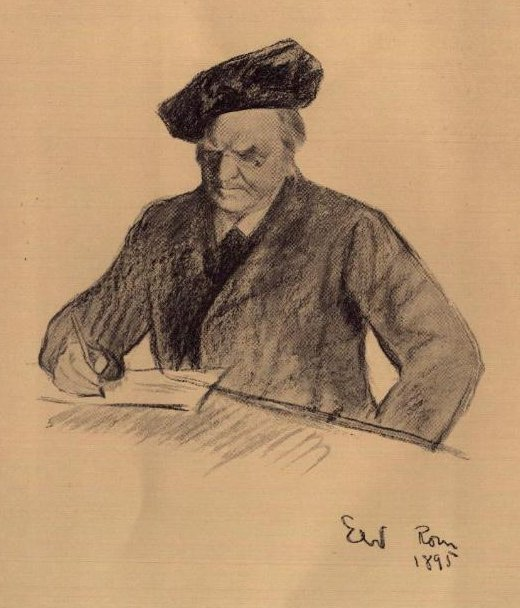
Bjørnstjerne Bjørnson (1895)

== Other sources ==
- Østby, Leif Erik Werenskiold ( Oslo: Dreyers Forlag, 1977) ISBN 978-82-09-01490-5
