= Dagfin Werenskiold =

Norwegian sculptor and painter

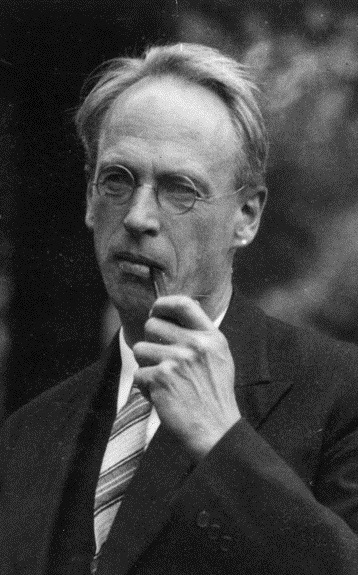
Dagfin Werenskiold

Dagfin Werenskiold (16 October 1892 – 29 June 1977) was a Norwegian sculptor and painter.

He was born in Bærum Municipality as son of Norwegian painter and illustrator Erik Werenskiold, and brother of geologist Werner Werenskiold. He first learned drawing from his father. In 1911, he first went on a study trip to Paris and in 1913 to Provence. In 1918 he married Elisabeth Mathilde Schram (1897–1989), the granddaughter of the book collector Thorvald Boeck. Werenskiold then studied in France from 1920 to 1923.

Dagfin Werenskiold made several relief works, including the bronze doors of the Oslo Cathedral in 1937 with scenes from the Sermon on the Mount. He also made decorations at St. Olaf College in Northfield, Minnesota as well as altarpieces for Hornindal Church in Hornindal Municipality in Sogn og Fjordane county and Sandefjord Church in Sandefjord Municipality in Vestfold county.

Among his works are the painting Jørgen Tjønnstaul in the National Gallery of Norway, a head sculpture of Fridtjof Nansen, and Yggdrasilfrisen in Oslo City Hall. He illustrated the 1939 edition of Nordahl Rolfsen's readers, and editions of Norwegian fairytales.
