= Hopen (Svalbard) =

Island in the southeastern part of the Svalbard archipelago, Norway

- Hopen in the southeast.

- Location of the island

Geography
- Location: Arctic Ocean
- Coordinates: 76°33′N 25°7′E
- Archipelago: Svalbard
- Area: 47 km^{2} (18 sq mi)
- Length: 34 km (21.1 mi)
- Width: 0.5 km (0.31 mi)
- Highest elevation: 371 m (1217 ft)
- Highest point: Iversenfjellet

Administration
- Norway

Demographics
- Population: 4

Ramsar Wetland
- Official name: Hopen
- Designated: 12 November 2010
- Reference no.: 1957

Hopen is an island in the southeastern part of the Svalbard archipelago (Norway). It is a small island that is only 34-kilometre (21 mi) in length and 0.5–2.5-kilometre (0.31–1.55 mi) in width. Hopen rises a maximum of 371-metre (1,217 ft) above sea level. It consists entirely of gently tilted, Triassic sedimentary strata, Its shape appears to reflect the effects of deep rooted regional faulting in the northeast Barents Sea.

The Norwegian Meteorological Institute has operated a staffed weather station on the island since 1947, with a staff of four persons. For the welfare of the crew, there are three cabins available on the island for their use.

== History ==
Hopen was discovered in 1596 by Jan Cornelisz Rijp during the third expedition by Willem Barentsz, trying to find the Northeast Passage. Later, in 1613, its name was given by Thomas Marmaduke of Hull, who named it after his former command, the Hopewell.

During World War II, the Luftwaffe placed a meteorological team there under cover of Operation Zitronella. Due to their remote location, the German soldiers on Hopen were the last in Europe to surrender to the allies, who had to in fact be rescued after losing radio contact almost 5 months prior.

On August 28, 1978 an early model Tupolev Tu-16 of the Soviet Air Force crashed on the island. All seven crew were killed in the accident. It was discovered two days later by the four-man Norwegian weather forecasting team. The USSR refused to admit the loss of an aircraft until the bodies of the crew were given to them. Norway transcribed the contents of the flight recorder over the objections of the Soviet government.

== Geology ==
Hopen consists of gently northwards dipping, sandstone, siltstone, and shale. These strata are displaced by a series of northwest-southeast trending normal faults that dip to both the southwest and northeast. The sedimentary strata that comprise Hopen have also been folded into gentle, low-relief synclinal and monoclinal structures. The limbs of these folds dip to both the northwest and southeast.

The sea cliffts of Hopen provide unique outcrops of Late Triassic strata that contain economically significant petroleum reservoirs in the bedrock lying beneath the Barents Sea. As a result, they have been studied in great detail by sedimentologists, petroleum geologists, and palynologists.

The Late Triassic strata exposed long the sea cliff of Hopen are the uppermost part of the De Geerdalen Formation; entirety of the overlying Flatsalen Formation; and the lower part of the Svenskøya Formation. the De Geerdalen Formation consists of interbedded sandstone and siltstone that accumulated in a paralic deltaic environment. The Flatsalen Formation consists of dark grey, silty shale with siltstone and sandstone beds with a bed of carbonate-cemented sandy siltstone at its base. Overlying the Flatsalen Formation, is medium-grained, porous, light-coloured sandstone of the Svenskøya Formation. The cliff-forming sandstone of the Svenskøya Formation is preseved only at the northern end of Hofen where it overlies the Flatsalen Formation. The exposed Late Triassic strata contain palynomorphs and poorly preserved fossil plant fragments.

== Environment ==
A significant number of polar bears are found at Hopen in the winter; moreover, the sub-population of Ursus maritimus found here is a genetically distinct taxon of polar bears associated with the Barents Sea region. Since 2003, little sea ice has surrounded the island.

=== Important Bird Area ===
The island has been identified as an Important Bird Area (IBA) by BirdLife International. It supports breeding populations of black-legged kittiwakes (40,000 pairs), Brünnich's guillemots (150,000 individuals) and black guillemots (1000 pairs).

== Climate ==
Hopen has a tundra climate (Köppen climate classification ET). The average annual temperature in Hopen is −3.6 °C (25.5 °F). The average annual rainfall is 355.4 mm (13.99 in) with September as the wettest month. The temperatures are highest on average in August, at around 3.9 °C (39.0 °F), and lowest in March, at around −10.4 °C (13.3 °F). The highest temperature ever recorded in Hopen was 17.4 °C (63.3 °F) on 9 July 1973; the coldest temperature ever recorded was −36.9 °C (−34.4 °F) on 4 March 1986.

Climate data for Hopen (1991–2020 normals, extremes 1945–present)
Month	Jan	Feb	Mar	Apr	May	Jun	Jul	Aug	Sep	Oct	Nov	Dec	Year
Record high °C (°F)	4.3 (39.7)	4.8 (40.6)	3.6 (38.5)	6.9 (44.4)	8.8 (47.8)	15.7 (60.3)	17.4 (63.3)	15.7 (60.3)	11.9 (53.4)	10.8 (51.4)	8.3 (46.9)	5.5 (41.9)	17.4 (63.3)
Mean maximum °C (°F)	1.5 (34.7)	1.5 (34.7)	1.3 (34.3)	2.0 (35.6)	3.5 (38.3)	5.7 (42.3)	8.5 (47.3)	9.1 (48.4)	7.9 (46.2)	4.8 (40.6)	3.1 (37.6)	2.4 (36.3)	10.1 (50.2)
Mean daily maximum °C (°F)	−6.6 (20.1)	−7.1 (19.2)	−7.9 (17.8)	−5.7 (21.7)	−1.4 (29.5)	2.1 (35.8)	4.7 (40.5)	5.1 (41.2)	3.5 (38.3)	−0.1 (31.8)	−2.6 (27.3)	−5.0 (23.0)	−1.7 (28.9)
Daily mean °C (°F)	−9.0 (15.8)	−9.6 (14.7)	−10.4 (13.3)	−8.0 (17.6)	−3.0 (26.6)	0.8 (33.4)	3.3 (37.9)	3.9 (39.0)	2.4 (36.3)	−1.4 (29.5)	−4.4 (24.1)	−7.2 (19.0)	−3.6 (25.6)
Mean daily minimum °C (°F)	−11.4 (11.5)	−12.0 (10.4)	−12.9 (8.8)	−10.3 (13.5)	−4.6 (23.7)	−0.6 (30.9)	1.8 (35.2)	2.6 (36.7)	1.3 (34.3)	−2.8 (27.0)	−6.1 (21.0)	−9.3 (15.3)	−5.4 (22.4)
Mean minimum °C (°F)	−21.9 (−7.4)	−22.5 (−8.5)	−23.3 (−9.9)	−19.6 (−3.3)	−11.4 (11.5)	−4.0 (24.8)	−0.9 (30.4)	0.0 (32.0)	−1.9 (28.6)	−8.8 (16.2)	−14.1 (6.6)	−19.1 (−2.4)	−26.0 (−14.8)
Record low °C (°F)	−35.5 (−31.9)	−34.6 (−30.3)	−36.9 (−34.4)	−30.2 (−22.4)	−22.2 (−8.0)	−9.9 (14.2)	−4.3 (24.3)	−4.4 (24.1)	−12.4 (9.7)	−29.0 (−20.2)	−31.7 (−25.1)	−35.6 (−32.1)	−36.9 (−34.4)
Average precipitation mm (inches)	36.1 (1.42)	26.9 (1.06)	34.4 (1.35)	26.3 (1.04)	21.4 (0.84)	18.6 (0.73)	23.6 (0.93)	35.4 (1.39)	35.9 (1.41)	34.7 (1.37)	29.8 (1.17)	32.4 (1.28)	355.4 (13.99)
Average precipitation days (≥ 0.1 mm)	20.43	18.86	19.77	17.93	16.83	13.60	14.37	19.00	20.87	22.47	21.17	21.10	226.07
Source: Météo climat

== Gallery ==
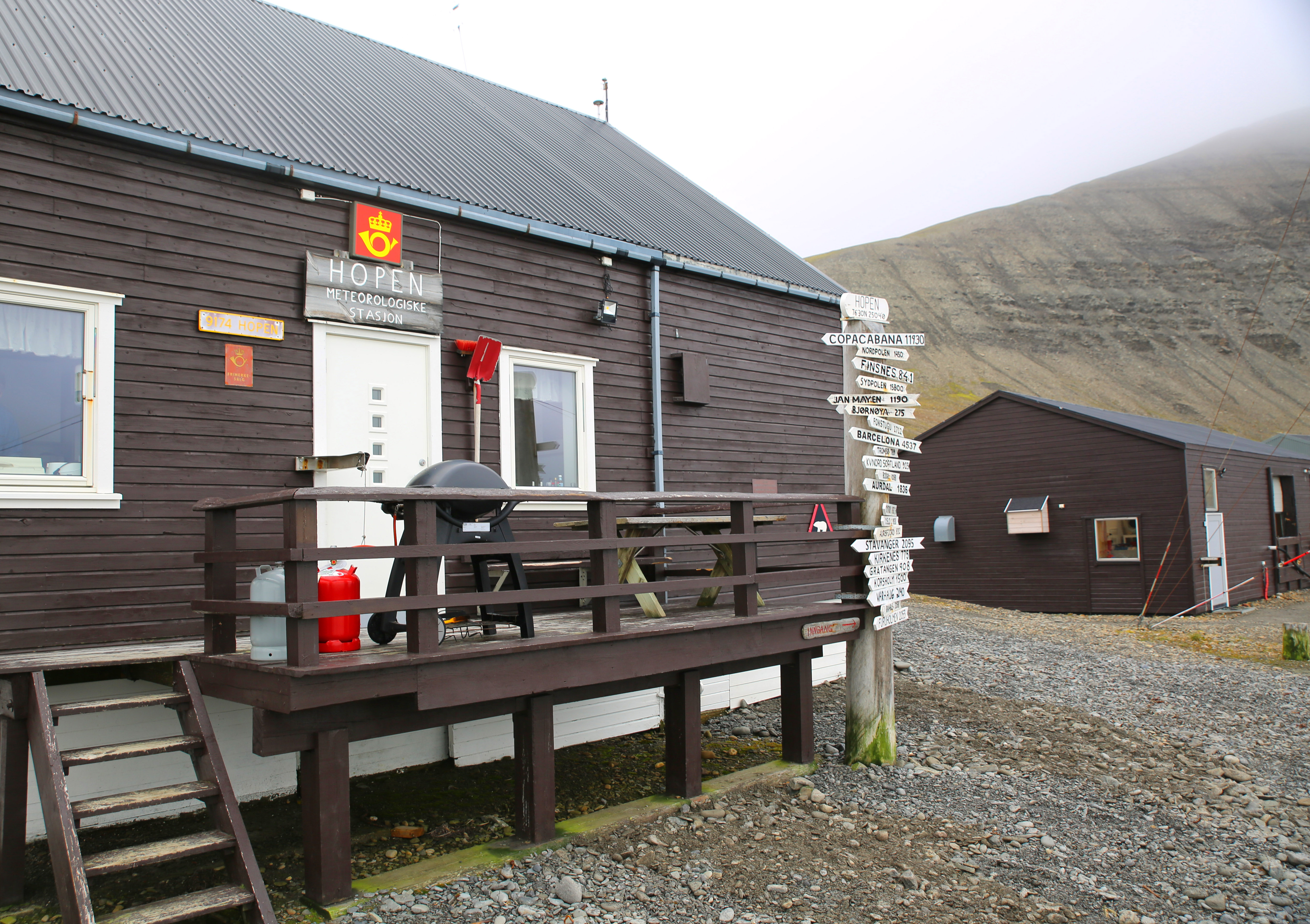
Hopen meteorological station in 2019

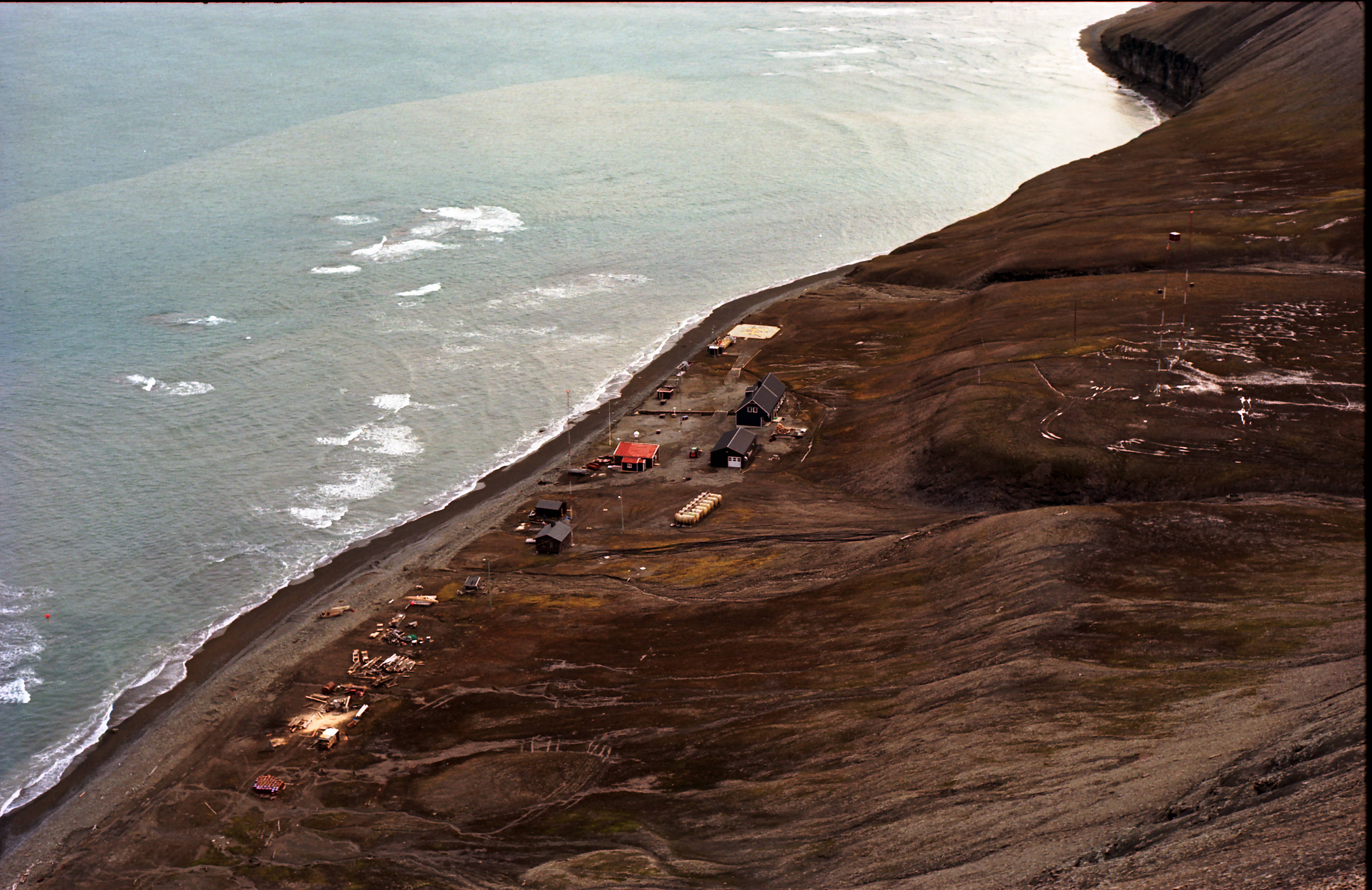
Hopen meteorological station, seen from north

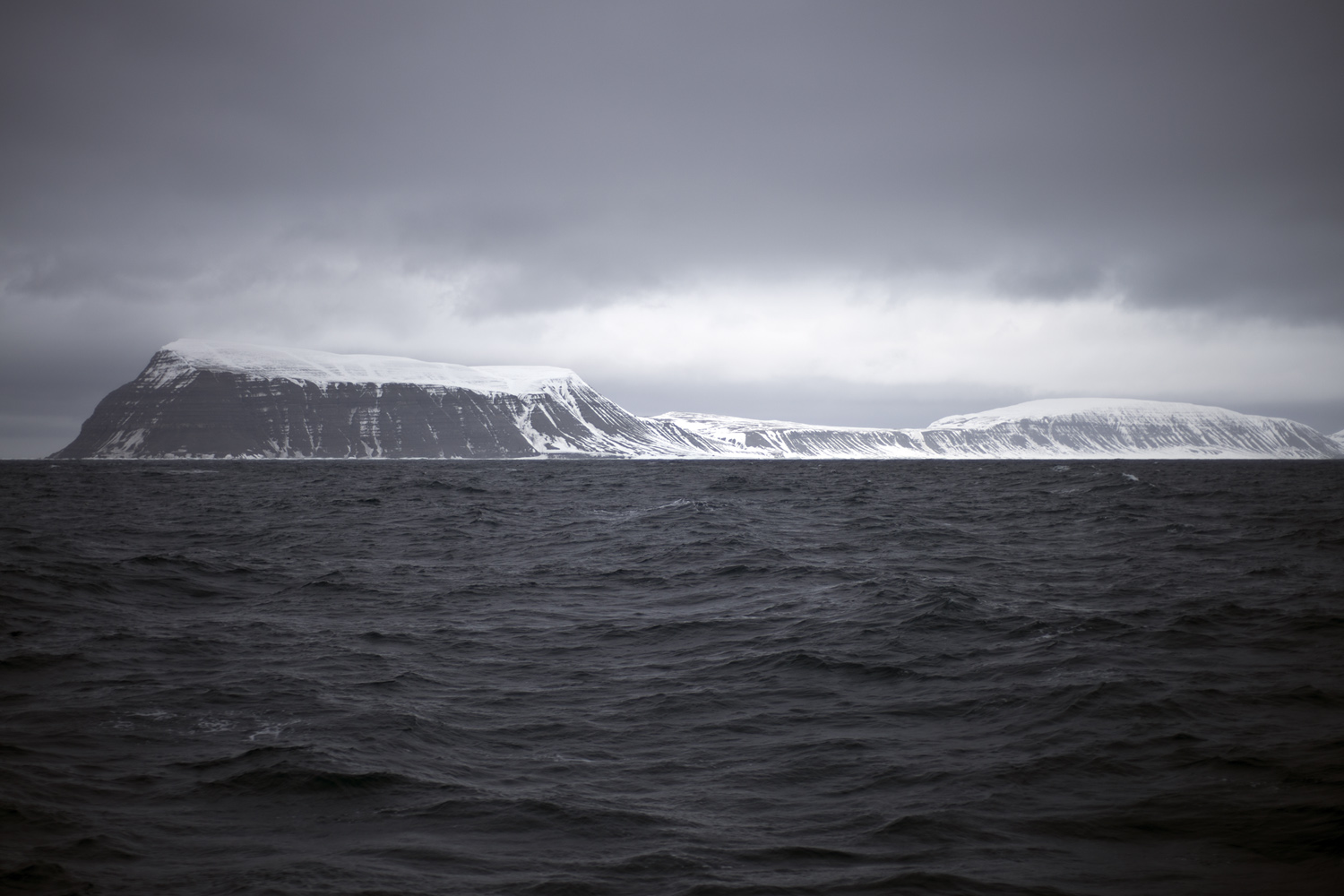
The southernmost point, Kapp Thor, and the highest point, Iversenfjellet (370 m) seen from south

== See also ==
- List of islands of Norway
