= Smør =

Smør may refer to:

== People ==
- Smør (noble family), a Norwegian medieval family
- Hallvard Jonson Smør (fl. 1368–1372), Norwegian knight
- Jon Smør (1240–1328), Norwegian knight and cabinet minister
- Jon Hallvardson Smør (fl. 1375), Norwegian nobleman
- Jon Svaleson Smør (died 1483), Norwegian knight, regent and cabinet minister
- Svale Jonson Smør (c. 1380–1442), Norwegian knight and cabinet minister
- Torgaut Jonson Smør (fl. 1353–1373), Norwegian nobleman and cabinet minister

== See also ==
- S'more, a North American campfire dessert
