= Benkestok =

Benkestok may refer to:

== Persons and families ==
- Benkestok (noble family)
- Jon Trondson Benkestok
- Torleiv Trondson Benkestok
- Trond Torleivsson Benkestok
