= Norwegian heraldry =

Use of coats of arms and insignia in Norway

- Norway's national arms are among the world's oldest national arms still in use. Official drawing of 1992 by Sverre Morken.
- Heraldic tradition: German-Nordic
- Governing body: King

Norwegian heraldry has roots in early medieval times, soon after the use of coats of arms first appeared in continental Europe. Some of the medieval coats of arms are rather simple of design, while others have more naturalistic charges. The king-granted coats of arms of later times were usually detailed and complex. Especially in the late 17th century and the 18th century, many ennobled persons and families received coats of arms with shields containing both two and four fields, and some even with an inescutcheon above these.

There are very few civic arms dating from before 1900, and most of today's governmental and civic arms are from the last decades of the 20th century. Today the public arms are popular in Norway and are used extensively by the official authorities.

The Norwegian Heraldry Society is a private heraldic organisation.

== Private heraldry and coats of arms ==
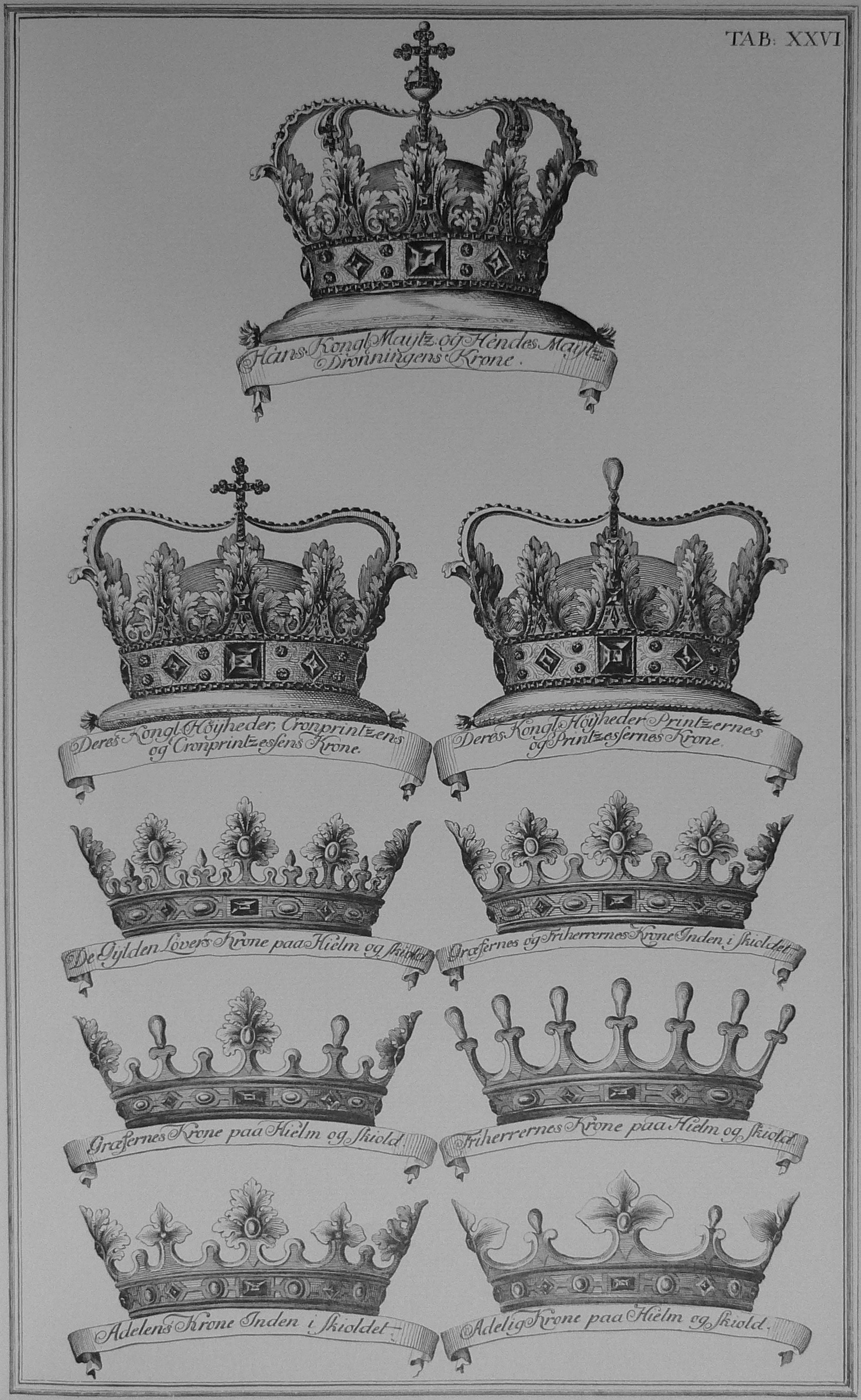
Coronets of rank according to regulations of 1693 for painting arms to be hanging in the knights' chapel at Fredriksborg.

=== History ===
Coats of arms in early medieval times were quite simple and of a rather basic design, when they were to be used in tournaments and other battles. The eldest Norwegian personal arms are known only from seals of the late 13th and the early 14th centuries. Most of the arms in the seals are not simple and have several charges combined, e.g. a griffin holding a bird (Bjarne Erlingsson 1288), two crossed axes and a fleur-de-lis (Jon Kollr 1297), and a fleur-de-lis between two roses on a fess (Baron Snare Aslaksson 1303).

The Dano-Norwegian union kings started to grant nobility and personal arms in the 15th Century. In the late 17th Century and during the 18th Century, many ennobled persons were granted arms with shields having two and four fields (e.g. Peter Tordenskiold), a few even with an escutcheon over all (e.g. Ludvig Holberg) and some with two supporters (e.g. Bernt Anker).

Arms were self-assumed in Norway and not a privilege for nobles. When nobility was granted by the union kings, even new arms were granted, often being the ennobled person's former arms with some additional charges (e.g. Herman Løvenskiold in 1739). Many of the ennobled person had direct influence on their new arms, especially those who paid a considerable amount of money to the king himself for the ennoblement (e.g. Gyldenkrantz).

=== Noble heraldic privileges ===
The Norwegian nobility had no real heraldic privileges, as it was allowed for all citizens to assume their own coats of arms. In letters patent to the nobility, however, it was expressly granted a legal protection for their new arms. After 1814 there has been no such granting of nobility and arms in Norway.

Unlike in Sweden, the use of open helmets was not reserved for the nobility. Coronets and supporters were formally reserved for the nobility, but they were used also by a number of others, without any protests from the public authorities. Supporters were normally granted to counts and higher ranks, but they were also granted to untitled nobility (e.g. Anker) and barons (e.g. Ludvig Holberg).

Noble coronets (Norwegian: adelskrone or rangkrone) were in principle for the nobility only. There were specific coronets for counts, barons, and untitled nobles. In addition, the Gyldenløver ("Golden Lions"), who were illegitimate royal descendants, had an exclusive coronet. The coronets for the nobility were, however, also used in arms and monograms by many burghers and peasants, e. g. in seals on the Norwegian Constitution of May 17, 1814, for the peasants Syvert Eeg and Christopher Hoen.

The use of physical coronets is not known in Norway.

=== Usage before and now ===
Coats of arms were in older times relatively frequent, used by nobles as well as citizens and farmers. There are today comparatively few personal coats of arms in Norway, especially in active use, and many of them are of foreign origin. Many Norwegian family arms have been created and established by private individuals and needed no grant or confirmation by any official authorities. Not many Norwegian family arms are those of former noble families.

=== Gallery ===
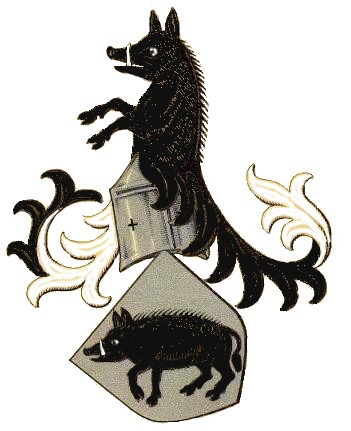
Galtung in medieval style by Anders Thiset, Denmark

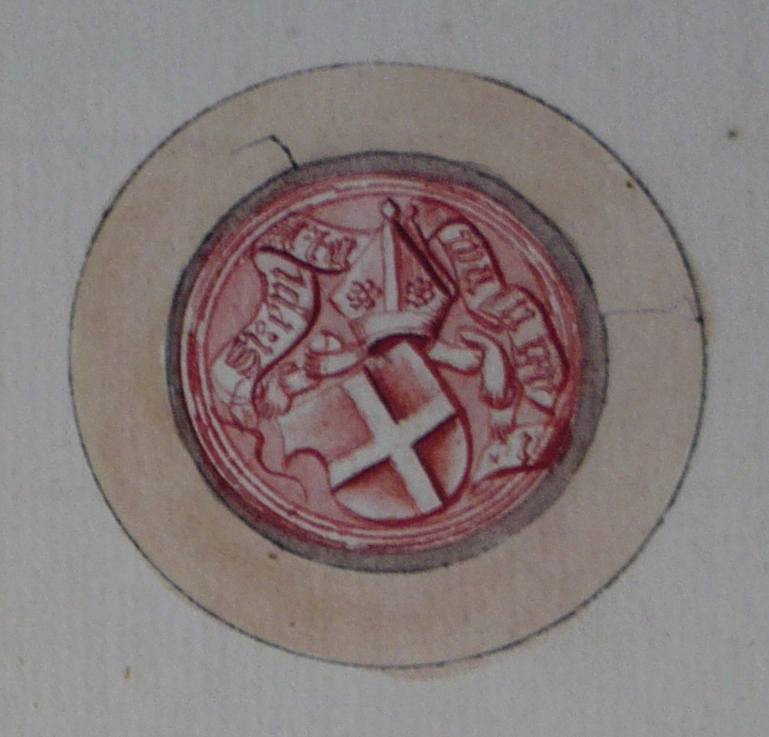
Bishop Oskuld's seal of 1524 from Stavanger

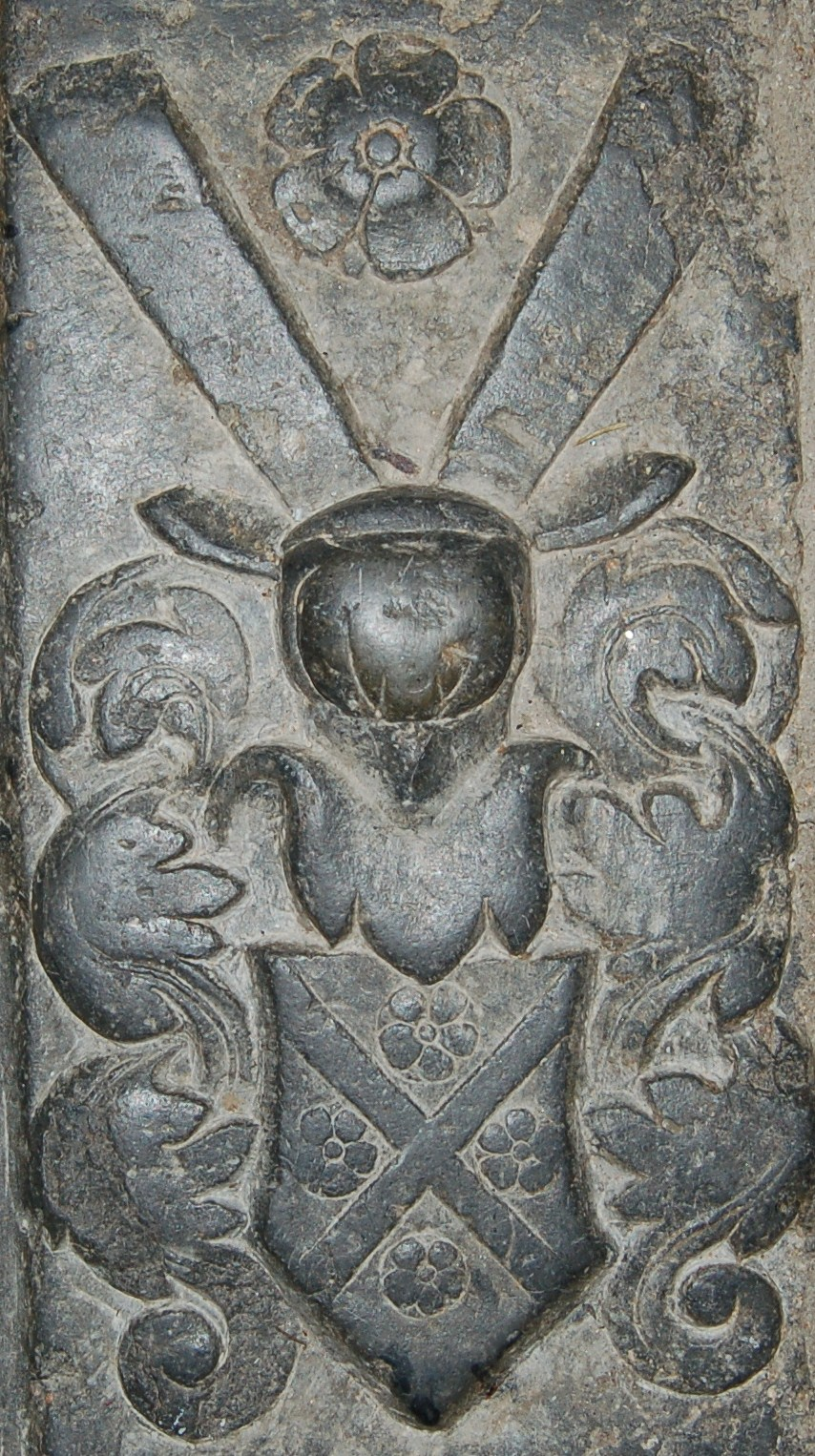
Kane on a tombstone from 1616

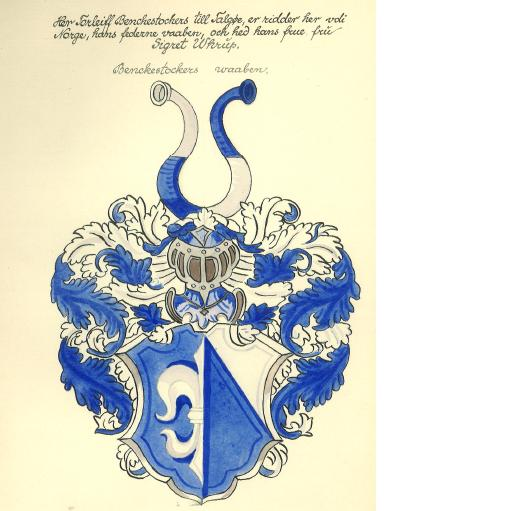
Benkestok in 17th Century style in Birgitte Seeblad's Armorial

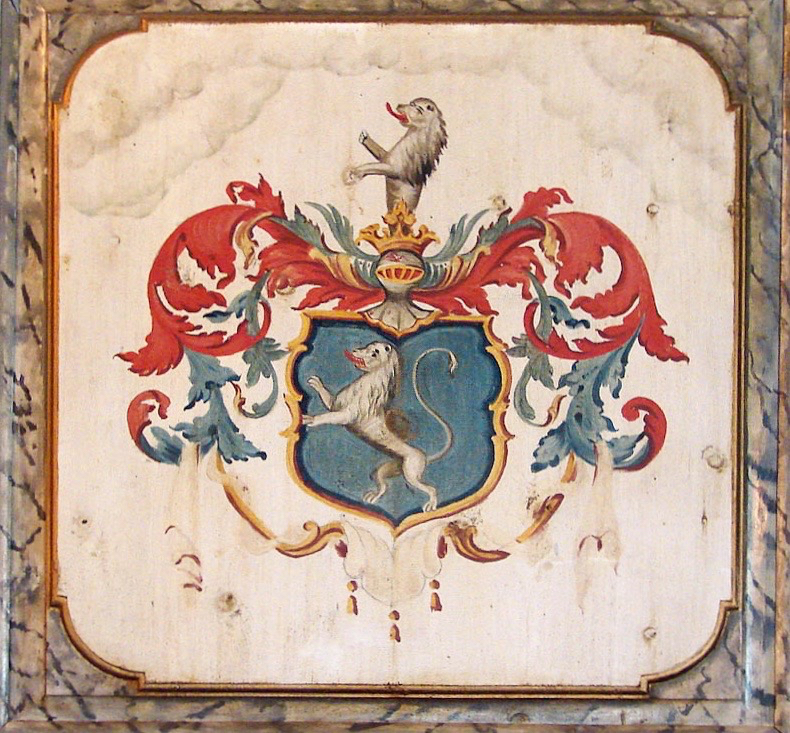
Løvenskiold in 18th Century style on a pew in Solum Church

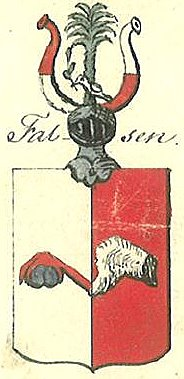
Falsen in early 19th Century style

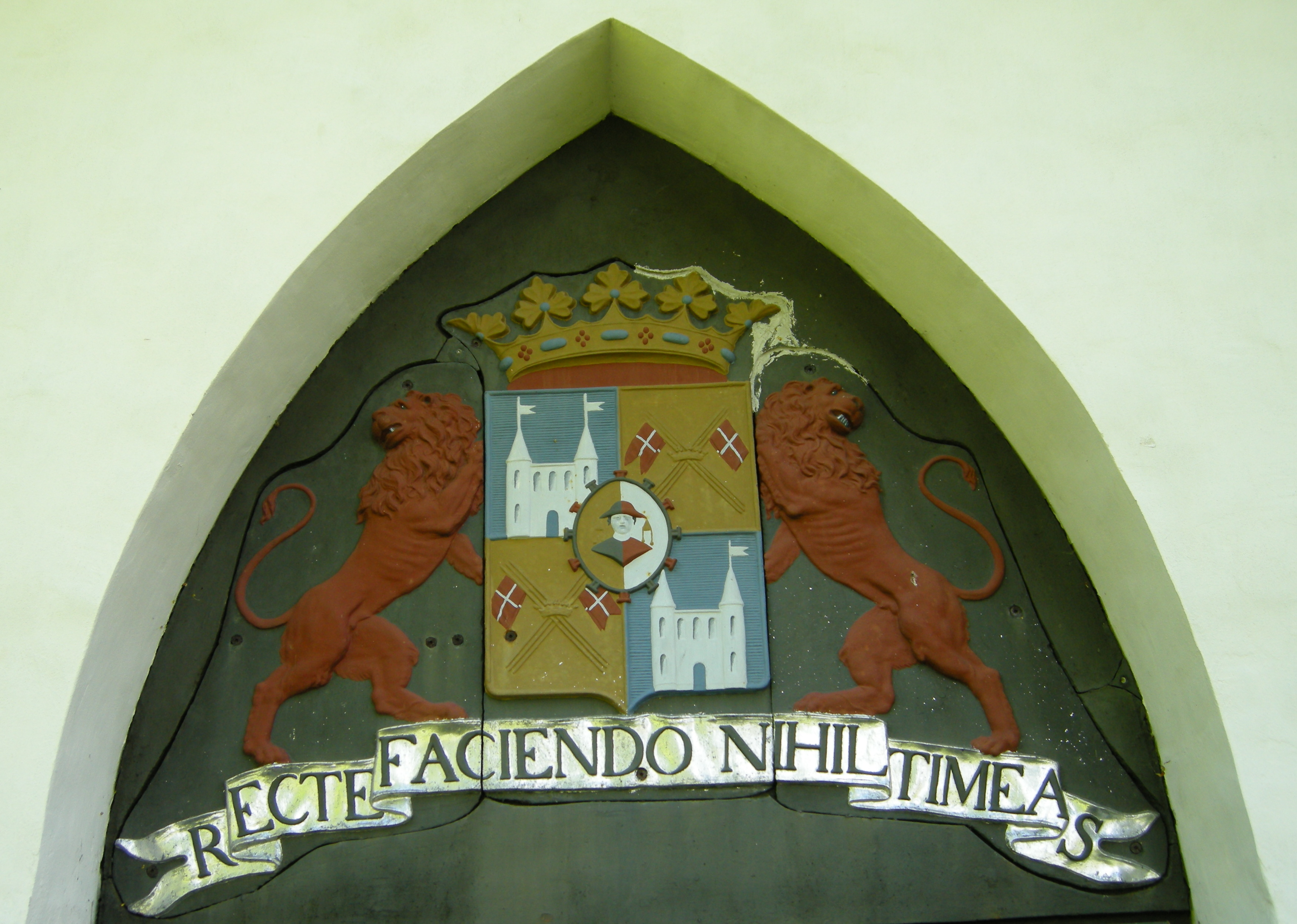
Wedel-Jarlsberg in 19th Century style above an entrance to Sem Church.

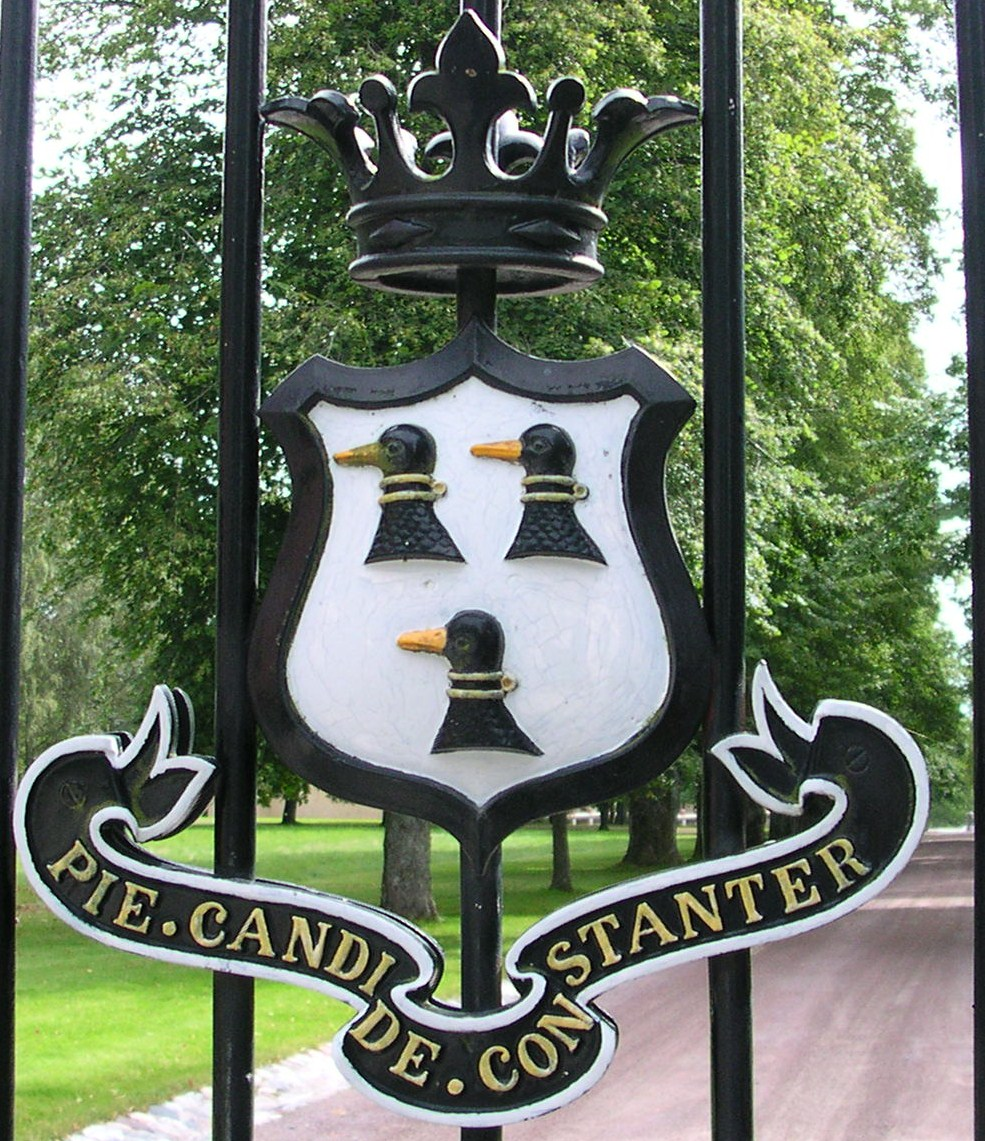
Treschow in 20th Century style on the portal to the manor house Fritzøehus.

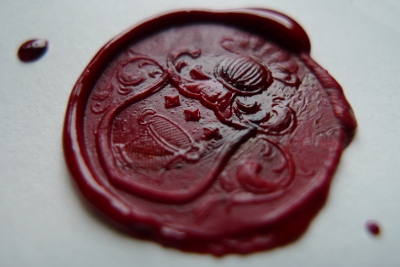
Brodtkorb in a seal from 2011.

== Official heraldry and coats of arms ==
=== Regulation ===
New private coats of arms need no official sanction and there is no legislation, official regulation or registration of such arms. The situation is different with the national and royal arms, the arms of military and civil governmental bodies, counties and municipalities; they are sanctioned by the King and they are protected by the Norwegian Penal Code.

For royal sanction of new coats of arms, the municipalities must apply to the Ministry of Local Government. This will then consult with the National Archives Office, which must recommend it to the government for the municipality to obtain the required Royal Decree.

Official and public coats of arms may only be used in official duties by offices of state, counties, and municipalities. There are several regulations for such use, i.a. that the arms must be placed at the top of the page on which they are printed.

There is no special Norwegian heraldic authority but the government uses the National Archives of Norway as expert consultant for municipal arms. The Norwegian Ministry of Foreign Affairs is the heraldic authority for use of the national coat of arms and the symbolic royal crown.

=== State and civic heraldry ===
A few Norwegian cities were granted arms (or seals with similar emblems) by the union kings: Kristiansand 1643, Halden 1665, Kristiansund and Molde 1742, Holmestrand and Lillehammer 1898.

Today practically all Norwegian municipalities and all counties have their own coat of arms and corresponding banner of arms as their flag. They usually have just one tincture and one metal, they are very simple in design, easy for blazoning, and very strong in symbolism. Some coats of arms are allowed to break from these rules if they are a revival of an old coat of arms with connection to the area.

Other institutions, like churches and some schools, also use coats of arms. The military also uses heraldry, and for this purpose, Major General Torbjørn Bergersen designed arms for all units in the Norwegian Army. Air force insignia, arms and badges all bear similarities to the United Kingdom's Royal Air Force as a result of close ties during the Second World War.

=== Gallery ===
The Norwegian Church

Defence Staff Norway

The Norwegian Army

The Norwegian Air Force

The Navy's tactical boat squadron

Sør-Varanger Garnison of the Norwegian Army

Norwegian Police Service

Østfold County

City of Trondheim

Ørskog Municipality

== Features ==
Norwegian heraldry belongs historically and basically to German-Nordic heraldic tradition. However, foreign impressions have found their way into modern heraldry.

Norwegian heraldry uses traditionally the five main colours. Orange is not used.

== House marks and monogrammes ==
Bumerke (plural: bumerker), rarely spelled bomerke, are house marks with some relations to coats of arms, as they were frequently used instead of arms, often displayed within an escutcheon or a shield. House marks were used for several purposes and like coats of arms, they were often used on private seals and signet rings. Coats of arms consist of coloured fields whilst house marks consist of simple lines only, suitable for carving on e.g. wooden utensils. They are renditions of very simple runic-like letters and other graphic symbols which signify a specific person or family. They may be passed down through generations with some changes from person to person. This custom has mostly died out. Before literacy became widespread, a bumerke would often be used instead of a signature.

Some bumerkes consist of monogrammes which are owner's name initials. Most bumerkes are not monogrammes, and a monogramme is not automatically a bumerke. However, monogrammes were often used for the same purposes as bumerkes, e.g. when signing documents or marking personal belongings.

=== Gallery ===
Chi Rho monogram (labarum) popular as Norwegian house mark

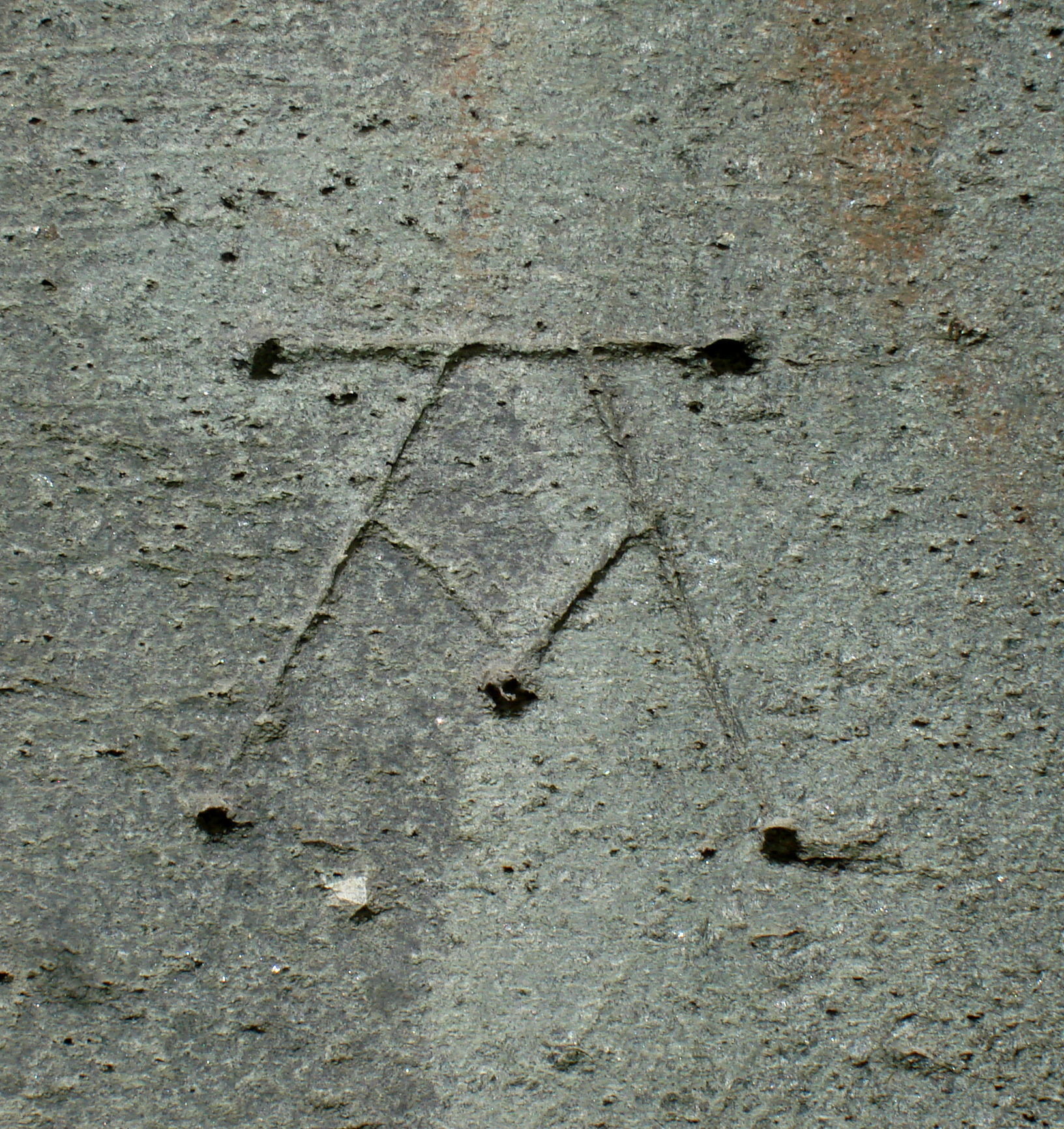
Stonecutter mark Nidaros Cathedral 12th Century: Ave Maria monogram was also a popular house mark

Pentagram popular as house mark with many variants

Popular house mark: hour glass variant called the slut (førkja)

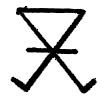
Popular house mark: hour glass variant

Popular house mark called a cock's foot

Popular house mark: triquetra variant

Popular house mark: Venus symbol

== See also ==
- Coat of arms of Norway
- Flag of Norway
- Armorial of Norway
- List of Norwegian flags
- Burgher arms
- House mark
- Norwegian nobility

== Literature and sources ==
- H.J. Huitfeldt-Kaas et al.: Norske Sigiller fra Middelalderen, Oslo 1899-1950 (Norwegian seals from the Middle Ages - in Norwegian)
- Hallvard Trætteberg: «The Coat of Arms of Norway», The American-Scandinavian Review, June 1964
- Hans Cappelen: Norske slektsvåpen, Oslo 1969 (2nd ed. 1976) (Norwegian family coats of arms), with English Summary
- Hans Cappelen and Knut Johannessen: Norske kommunevåpen, Oslo 1987 (Norwegian municipal coats of arms), with English Summary
- Hans Cappelen: "Norwegian Simplicity. The principles of recent public heraldry in Norway", The Coat of Arms,, Vol. VII, No. 138, London 1988, pp 15-24
- Hans Cappelen: "The Heraldry of the Norwegian Armed Forces", Genealogica & Heraldica Lisboa 1986 (Congress Report), Lisboa 1989, Vol. 2, pp 179-185
- Harald Nissen and Monica Aase: Segl i Universitetsbiblioteket i Trondheim, Trondheim 1990 (seals in the University Library of Trondheim)
- Harald Nissen: «Norwegian Heraldry», Heraldry in Canada (1-2), 1995
- Knut Johannesen: Art by Royal Decree, National Archives of Norway, Oslo 1998 (municipal arms in Norway - in Norwegian)
- Hans Cappelen Bumerker i Norge: En oversikt, Oslo 2005 (about house marks - in Norwegian)
- Hans Cappelen: House marks in Norway, Oslo 2005 (an English summary)
- Elin Galtung Lihaug (editor): Report from the International Congress of Genealogical and Heraldic Sciences, Oslo 2014
