= 1526 =

1526 in various calendars
- Gregorian calendar: 1526; MDXXVI
- Ab urbe condita: 2279
- Armenian calendar: 975; ԹՎ ՋՀԵ
- Assyrian calendar: 6276
- Balinese saka calendar: 1447–1448
- Bengali calendar: 932–933
- Berber calendar: 2476
- English Regnal year: 17 Hen. 8 – 18 Hen. 8
- Buddhist calendar: 2070
- Burmese calendar: 888
- Byzantine calendar: 7034–7035
- Chinese calendar: 乙酉年 (Wood Rooster); 4223 or 4016 — to — 丙戌年 (Fire Dog); 4224 or 4017
- Coptic calendar: 1242–1243
- Discordian calendar: 2692
- Ethiopian calendar: 1518–1519
- Hebrew calendar: 5286–5287
- Hindu calendars
- Vikram Samvat: 1582–1583
- Shaka Samvat: 1447–1448
- Kali Yuga: 4626–4627
- Holocene calendar: 11526
- Igbo calendar: 526–527
- Iranian calendar: 904–905
- Islamic calendar: 932–933
- Japanese calendar: Daiei 6 (大永６年)
- Javanese calendar: 1444–1445
- Julian calendar: 1526; MDXXVI
- Korean calendar: 3859
- Minguo calendar: 386 before ROC 民前386年
- Nanakshahi calendar: 58
- Thai solar calendar: 2068–2069
- Tibetan calendar: ཤིང་མོ་བྱ་ལོ་ (female Wood-Bird); 1652 or 1271 or 499 — to — མེ་ཕོ་ཁྱི་ལོ་ (male Fire-Dog); 1653 or 1272 or 500

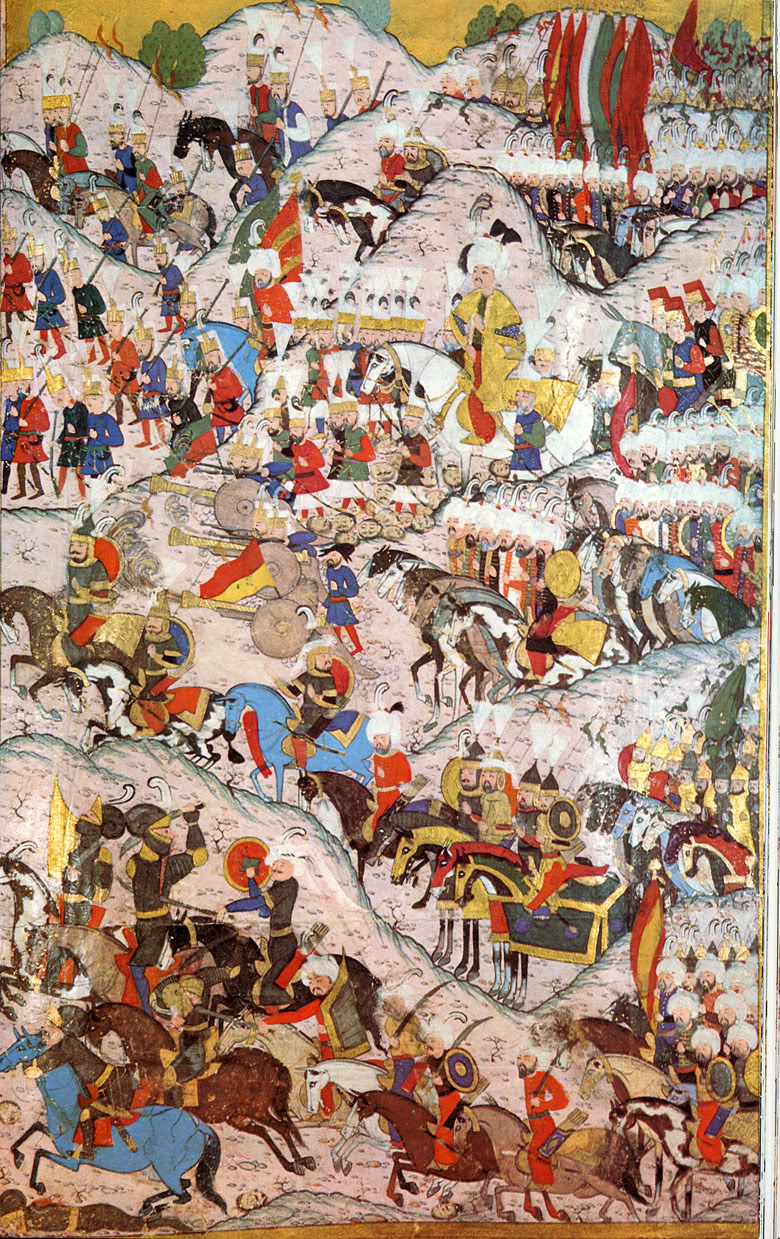
August 29: Battle of Mohács

Year 1526 (MDXXVI) was a common year starting on Monday of the Julian calendar.

== Events ==
=== January–March ===
- January 14 – Treaty of Madrid: Peace is declared between Francis I of France and Charles V, Holy Roman Emperor. Francis agrees to cede Burgundy and abandons all claims to Flanders, Artois, Naples, and Milan.
- January 26 – The deadline for Spanish Muslims to convert to Christianity or leave is reached in the Crown of Aragon and the Principality of Catalonia as decreed by the edict of November 25 by Charles V, Holy Roman Emperor acting in his capacity as King of Spain. The deadline for the Kingdom of Valencia had passed on December 31, 1525.
- February 6 – Suleiman the Magnificent, Sultan of the Ottoman Empire, agrees to form a military alliance with France, after King François I sends a proposal by way of his envoy, Jean Frangipani.
- February 9 – In Guatemala, a group of 16 deserters from the Spanish colonial army destroy Iximche, the capital of the indigenous kingdom of the Mayan Kaqchikel people, and burn the palace of the Ahpo Xahil
- February 15 – Spanish author Gonzalo Fernández de Oviedo y Valdés, commonly called "Oviedo", publishes the chronicle La Natural Hystoria De Las Indias (The Natural History of the Indies)
- February 21 – Lopo Vaz de Sampaio becomes the new Governor of Portuguese India following the February 2 death of the 30-year-old Governor Henrique de Meneses from gangrene resulting from a battle injury to his leg.
- February 25 – The Battle of Hisar Firoza is fought in what is now the Indian state of Haryana, between the Mughal Empire (whose army is led by Prince Humayun) and the Delhi Sultanate, led by Hamid Khan. Humayun, in his first command, leads the Mughals to victory.
- February 27 – The League of Torgau is formed as an alliance of German princes to oppose the 1521 Edict of Worms.
- March 6 –
  - After a defeat in battle of Afghan soldiers of the Delhi Sultanate by the Mughal Empire, the Mughal Emperor Babur and Crown Prince Humayun arrange the execution of 100 captured Afghan prisoners by "blowing from a gun, the process of placing or tying a condemned prisoner to the mouth of a cannon and then firing.
  - King François I of France is released from captivity in Spain after having signed the Treaty of Madrid.
- March 7 – In Switzerland, the Canton of Zurich enacts a law directed against the Anabaptist movement, specifically outlawing a second baptism of an adult who was previously baptized as an infant, and makes the crime punishable by drowning. The penalty is enforced for the first time on January 5, 1527, when Felix Manz is executed.
- March 10 – Charles V, Holy Roman Emperor and King of Spain, marries Princess Isabella of Portugal at the Alcázar of Seville palace in Spain.
- March 17 – King François I crosses from the Bidasoa River from Spain into France, while at the same time, his sons the Dauphin Prince François and Prince Henri, 8 and 5 at the time, cross into Spain to take his place as hostages to guarantee France's compliance with the Madrid Treaty. King François repudiates the treaty and the two boys remain captive for the next three years.
- March – The first complete printed translation of the New Testament of the Bible into the English language by William Tyndale arrives in England from Germany, where printing had been completed in Worms by Peter Schöffer the younger, towards the end of February.

=== April–June ===
- April 21 – Battle of Panipat: Babur becomes Mughal emperor, invades northern India and captures Delhi, creating the Mughal Empire, which lasts until 1857.
- May 22 – Francis repudiates the Treaty of Madrid and forms the League of Cognac against Charles, including Pope Clement VII, Milan, Venice, and Florence.
- May 23 – A transit of Venus occurs, the last before optical filters allow astronomers to observe them.
- June 9 – Emperor Go-Nara ascends to the throne of Japan.

=== July–September ===
- July 24 – Milan is captured by the Spanish.
- July 25 – The Spanish ship Santiago, from García Jofre de Loaísa's expedition, reaches the Pacific Coast of Mexico and drops anchor at the Gulf of Tehuantepec, becoming the first ship to sail from Europe to the west coast of North America.
- August 9 – Lucas Vázquez de Ayllón of Spain founded the failed colony, San Miguel de Gualdape in present-day Winyah Bay, Georgetown County, South Carolina. It was the first European settlement, as well as the first documented occurrence of enslavement of African peoples in what would later become the continental United States.
- August 15 – The first official translation is made of the New Testament into Swedish; the entire Bible is completed in 1541.
- August 21 – Spanish explorer Alonso de Salazar becomes the first European to sight the Marshall Islands, in the Pacific Ocean.
- August 29 – Battle of Mohács: The Ottoman army of Sultan Suleiman I defeats the Hungarian army of King Louis II, who drowns while retreating with his troops. Two rival groups seek to elect a successor to Louis. Suleiman takes Buda, while Archduke Ferdinand of Austria and John Zápolya, Prince of Transylvania, dispute the succession. As a result of the battle, Ragusa achieves independence, although it acknowledges Ottoman overlordship.
- September 19 – Spanish Muslims who had hidden in the Sierra de Espadán mountain range in Valencia and who are led by Selim Almanzo are overwhelmed by a German contingent of 3,000 soldiers from the Holy Roman Empire. After their defeat, 5,000 adult Muslims (including old men and women) are massacred.

=== October–December ===
- October 23 – In October, Cuthbert Tunstall, the Roman Catholic Bishop of London, issues a proclamation directing followers to destroy all copies of Tyndale's New Testament.
- October 24 – The Bohemian Diet elects Archduke Ferdinand of the House of Habsburg as the King of Bohemia.
- November 10 – In eastern Hungary, at Székesfehérvár, a group of lesser nobles proclaims John Zápolya as proclaimed as the King of Hungary. The assembly proclaims the Eastern Hungarian Kingdom, with a capital at Buda.
- December 15 – (12th day of 11th month of Daiei 6) The siege of Kamakura takes place in Japan as the Uesugi clan defeats the Hōjō clan
- December 17 – At Pozsony in western Hungary (now Bratislava in Slovakia), the Diet elects the Archduke Ferdinand as the King of Hungary.

=== Date unknown ===
- Gunsmith Bartolomeo Beretta (in Italian) establishes the Beretta Gun Company, which will still be in business in the 21st century, making it one of the world's oldest firearm corporations.
- Spanish conquistadors led by Francisco Pizarro and his brothers first reach Inca territory in South America.

== Births ==
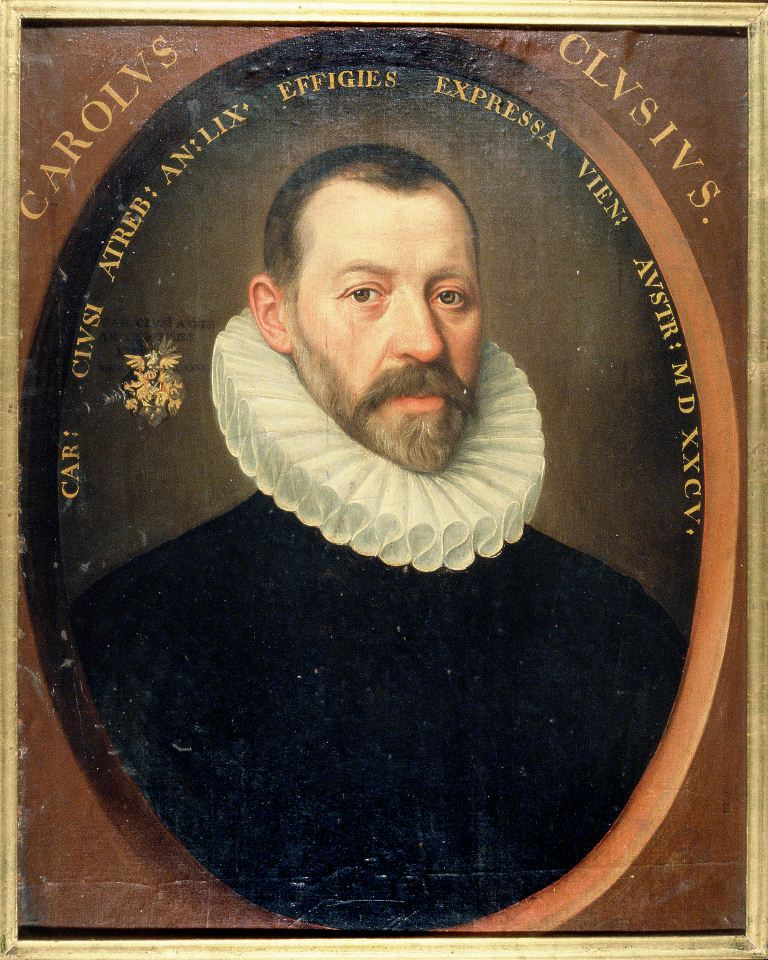
Carolus Clusius

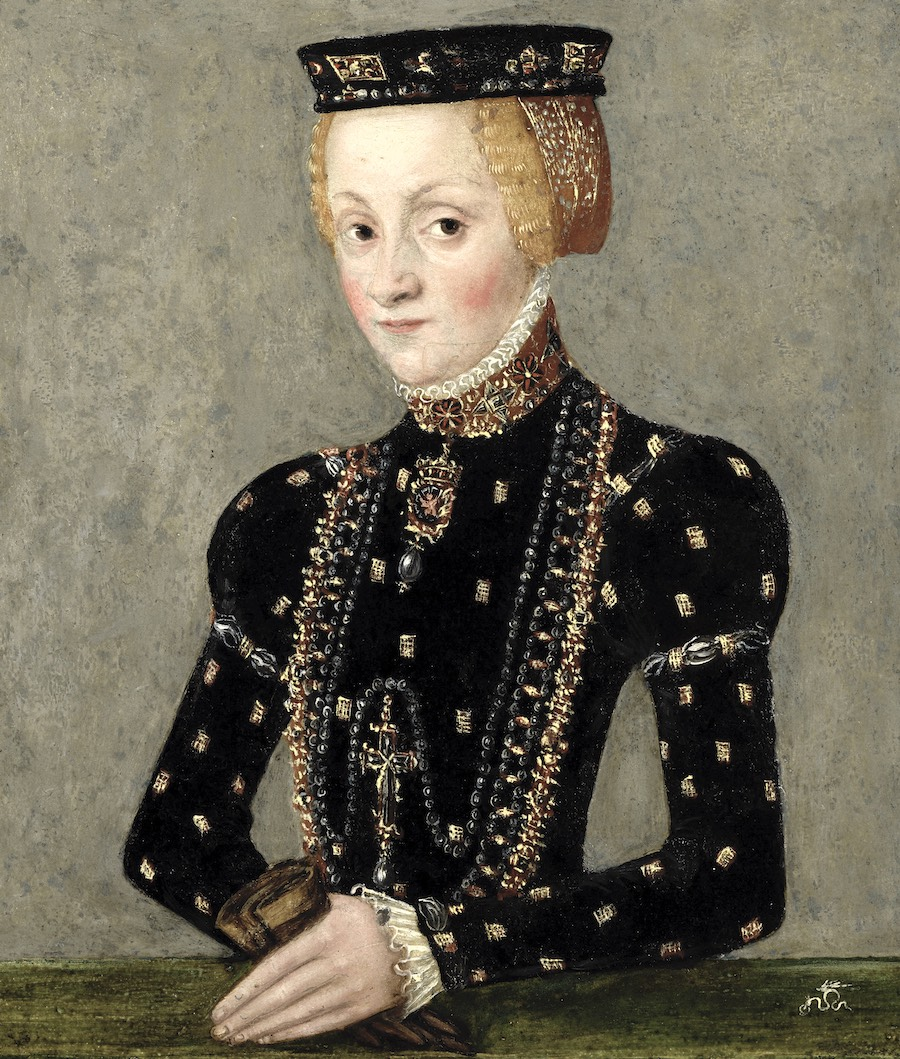
Catherine Jagiellon

- January 1 – Louis Bertrand, Spanish missionary to Latin America, patron saint of Colombia (d. 1581)
- January 20 – Rafael Bombelli, Italian mathematician (d. 1572)
- January 25 – Adolf, Duke of Holstein-Gottorp (d. 1586)
- February 1 – Niiro Tadamoto, Japanese samurai (d. 1611)
- February 2 – Konstanty Wasyl Ostrogski, Polish noble (d. 1608)
- February 19 – Charles de L'Ecluse, Flemish botanist (d. 1609)
- February 23 – Gonçalo da Silveira, Portuguese Jesuit missionary (d. 1561)
- March 4 – Henry Carey, 1st Baron Hunsdon (d. 1596)
- March 11 – Heinrich Rantzau, German humanist writer, astrologer, and astrological writer (d. 1598)
- April 5 – Giuseppe Arcimboldo, Italian painter (d. 1593)
- April 8 – Elisabeth of Brunswick-Calenberg, Countess of Henneberg (d. 1566)
- April 12 – Muretus, French humanist (d. 1585)
- April 29 – Beate Clausdatter Bille, Danish noblewoman (d. 1593)
- June 9 – Matsudaira Hirotada, Japanese daimyō (d. 1549)
- June 25 – Elisabeth Parr, Marchioness of Northampton, English noble (d. 1565)
- July 9 – Elizabeth of Austria, Polish noble (d. 1545)
- July 10 – Philipe de Croÿ, Duke of Aerschot (d. 1595)
- July 31 – Augustus, Elector of Saxony (d. 1586)
- August 18 – Claude, Duke of Aumale (d. 1573)
- August 22 – Adolph of Nassau-Saarbrücken, Count of Nassau (d. 1559)
- September 23 – Henry Manners, 2nd Earl of Rutland (d. 1563)
- September 26 – Wolfgang, Count Palatine of Zweibrücken (d. 1569)
- October 1 – Dorothy Stafford, English noble (d. 1604)
- October 30 – Hubert Goltzius, Dutch Renaissance painter-engraver (d. 1583)
- November 1 – Catherine Jagiellon, queen of John III of Sweden (d. 1583)
- November 12 – Andreas Gaill, German jurist and statesman (d. 1587)
- December 12 – Álvaro de Bazán, 1st Marquis of Santa Cruz, Spanish admiral (d. 1588)
- December 26 – Rose Lok, English businesswoman and Protestant exile during the Tudor period (d. 1613)
- December 28 – Anna Maria of Brandenburg-Ansbach, German princess (d. 1589)
- date unknown
  - Kenau Simonsdochter Hasselaer, Dutch war heroine (d. 1588)
  - Ikoma Chikamasa, Japanese daimyō in the Azuchi-Momoyama and Edo periods (d. 1603)
  - Azai Hisamasa, Japanese warlord (d. 1573)
- probable
  - Taqi ad-Din Muhammad ibn Ma'ruf, Ottoman Muslim scientist (d. 1585)

== Deaths ==
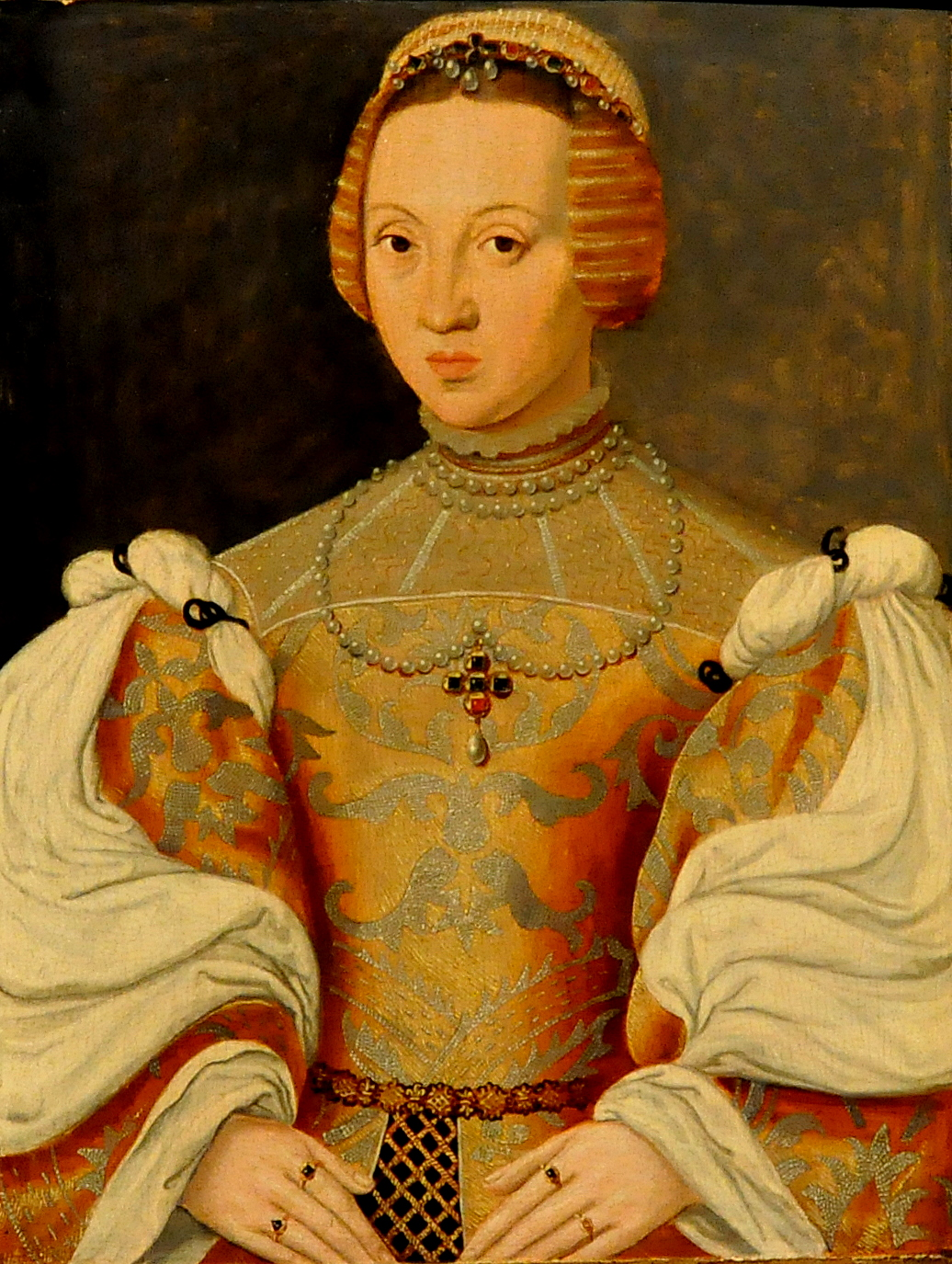
Isabella of Austria

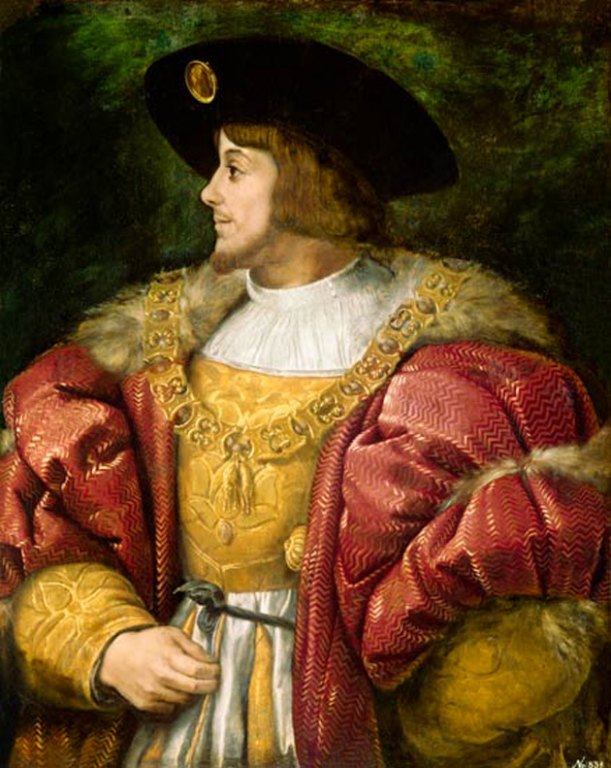
Louis II of Hungary

- January 16 – Catherine of the Palatinate, Abbess of Neuburg am Neckar (b. 1499)
- January 19 – Isabella of Burgundy, queen of Christian II of Denmark (b. 1501)
- February 23 – Diego Colón, Spanish Viceroy of the Indies (b. c. 1479)
- March 24 – Adolph II, Prince of Anhalt-Köthen, German prince (b. 1458)
- March 30 – Konrad Mutian, German humanist (b. 1471)
- April 21 – Ibrahim Lodi, last Sultan of Delhi (in battle)
- April 25 – Charles Somerset, 1st Earl of Worcester (b. 1460)
- May 19 – Emperor Go-Kashiwabara of Japan (b. 1464)
- June 4 – Francisco Fernández de la Cueva, 2nd Duke of Alburquerque, Spanish duke (b. 1467)
- July 14 – John de Vere, 14th Earl of Oxford, English noble (b. 1499)
- July 30 – García Jofre de Loaísa, Spanish explorer (b. 1490)
- August 4 – Juan Sebastián Elcano, Spanish explorer (b. 1476)
- August 29 – King Louis II of Hungary (in battle) (b. 1506)
- September 5 – Alonso de Salazar, Spanish explorer
- October 18 – Lucas Vázquez de Ayllón, Spanish explorer (b. 1480)
- November 5 – Scipione del Ferro, Italian mathematician (b. 1465)
- November 30 – Giovanni dalle Bande Nere, Italian condottiero (b. 1498)
- December 12 – Le Chieu Tong, Emperor of Đại Việt, was killed by Mạc Đăng Dung (b. 1506)

=== Date unknown ===
- Abu Bakr ibn Muhammad, sultan of Adal (assassinated)
- Francisco Hernández de Córdoba, founder of the Spanish colony of Nicaragua (b. c. 1475)
- Ingerd Erlendsdotter, noblewoman and landowner
- Binnya Ran II, Burmese king of Hanthawaddy (b. 1469)
- Conrad Grebel, co-founder of the Anabaptist movement (b. 1498)
