= Axel Gyntersberg =

Norwegian nobleman

Axel Gyntersberg (c. 1525 – 1588) was a Norwegian nobleman and feudal overlord.

Gyntersberg (also referred to as Axel Gyntersberg til Mel) was the son of Heinrich Güntersberg and Kirsten Lagesdatter Ref. His exact birthplace is not known. His father had come to Norway around 1520 from Pomerania.

Gyntersberg was overlord of the Rein Abbey from 1555 and of Bakke Abbey from 1560. During the Protestant Reformation, both were taken over by the Crown. He was commander of the island fortress at Steinvikholm Castle (1560 to 1564) until expelled by Swedish forces during the Northern Seven Years' War. From 1565 he administrated the Crown's estate on the island of Torget, just off shore from Brønnøysund (1565-1571). He died in Kvinnherad during 1588.

He was married to Kirstine Trondsdatter Benkestokk (1510-1572), the sister of nobleman Jon Trondson Benkestok ( ca. 1530-1593), and the daughter of overlord and land owner Trond Benkestokk (ca. 1500–1558). The couple had ten children, and several of his daughters married into prominent noble families. His wife had inherited an interest in the Mel estate in the present-day Kvinnherad Municipality in Hordaland.
