= Jon Trondson Benkestok =

Norwegian nobleman (1530 – c. 1593)

Jon Trondson Benkestok (1530 – c. 1593) was a Norwegian nobleman (Adelsmann) and a member of the Benkestok family, one of the original noble families of Norway.

== Family background ==
Jon Trondson Benkestok was reported to be a direct descendant of Harald Gille, King of Norway. Most of his ancestors served as knights in the king's army of Norway. The Benkestok family was married into the Norwegian noble families Smør, Galte (later: Galtung) and Kane, which were the original Norwegian noble families. The common ancestral of the Benkestok family was Gaut at Ænes in Hardanger, born c. 1100. He was a lendmann and his son Jon Gautsson was a lendmann in the service of King Magnus Erlingsson.

== Biography ==
Jon Trondson Benkestok was the son of Trond Torleivsson Benkestok and Anna Jonsdotter Haard. Both of his parents were born of very high station. He had a younger brother named Tord and three sisters Adelus, Kristin and Brynild. After his father died on 14 February 1558, in Vanse, Jon inherited large estates in Nordland. His mother died on November 27, 1569, in Bergen, Norway, she was buried on November 30, 1569, in the Bergen Cathedral in Bergen, Norway.

Jon Trondson Benkestok was a signatory when King Christian IV was hailed by the Norwegian nobility at Akershus Castle in 1591. He signed the document with the family's signet ring. He probably died around the year 1593.

== Marriage and issue ==
Jon Benkestok married a so-called "unfree" woman, Birgitte Nilsdotter, and their children lost their noble status and was commoners. Known children were:

- Torolf († 1622; died without children).
- Anders († after 1630; married, no known children).
- Trond († 1626; had a daughter).
- Johan († unknown; had a daughter).
- Christopher († after 1618; had two sons).
- Niels († after 1599).
- Anna († after 1599).
- Margrethe († unknown; married, had several descendants).

== Notes ==
- Danmarks Adels Aarbog 1887 (Yearbook of the Danish nobility)
- Suhms Samlinger til den Danske Historie, 2. bind, II s. 99.

== Other sources ==
- Brandt, Wilhelmine Slægten Benkestok original edition: Christiania 1904. facsimile ed. 1997 (Oslo. Damms antikvariat) ISBN 82-90438-07-9.
