= Hallvard Jonson Smør =

Hallvard Jonson Smør (fl. 1368–1372) was a Norwegian knight.

Hallvard was a son of Jon Smør. In 1368 Hallvard owned Røken and Hurum in Oslo syssel, which Gaute Eriksen of the Galte-family had owned the year before. He later gave land in "Refvolom" in Romerike for a Requiem Mass, which was confirmed by King Haakon VI of Norway in 1372. He was married to an otherwise unknown sister of Svale Ølversson, an "Ølversdotter", and had two known sons, Jon and Hallkjell.

== See also ==
- Smør
- Norwegian nobility

== Sources ==
- Handegård, Odd (2008), "Vår felles slektshistorie. Hardanger, Sunnhordland og Ryfylke m.m. 1170-1650", p. 107
