= Jon Smør =

Jon Ragnvaldson Smør (c. 1240 – bef. 1328) was a Norwegian knight and cabinet minister (riksråd). He was the Bergen city recorder (gjaldker) and also owned land among other places in outer Sunnfjord.

In 1295, he was present at Hindsgavl castle (Hindsgavl slott) on the island of Funen where he co-signed a truce in the War of the Outlaws (De fredløses krig) between the kingdoms of Norway and Denmark. The year later he confirmed, together with king Eric II of Norway, a settlement between the archbishop of Nidaros and his Chapter. In 1297 he was present at multiple major cases in Trøndelag, and in 1305 he witnessed about the dowry of princess Euphemia of Rügen, spouse of king Håkon V of Norway.

Jon's ancestry is not known, and he is therefore considered to be the first known member of the Smør family (Smørsætta) of Norwegian nobles. Historian P. A. Munch did however claim that Jon's father could have been Ragnvald Urka who joined king Haakon IV of Norway on his trip to Scotland in 1263, but no real evidence is known to support this theory. Jon Ragnvaldson Smør is regarded to likely have had three known sons; Svale Jonson Smør, Hallvard Jonson Smør and Torgaut Jonson Smør.

== See also ==
- Smør (noble family)
- Norwegian nobility

== Other sources ==
- Handegård, Odd (2008), "Vår felles slektshistorie. Hardanger, Sunnhordland og Ryfylke m.m. 1170-1650", p. 107
