= Ingerd Erlendsdotter =

Norwegian noblewoman and landowner (1440–1526)

- Born: 1440
- Died: 1526 (aged 85–86); Bergen, Norway
- Spouses: Olav Guttormsson; Arald Kane

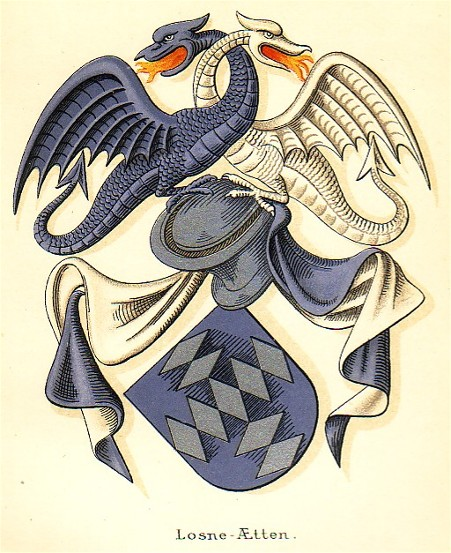
Coat of arms of the Losne family.

Ingerd Erlendsdotter (1440–1526) was a Norwegian noblewoman and landowner during the 15th century, who through inheritance and marriage, became one of the largest landowners in Norway.

== Life ==
Ingerd Erlendsdotter was born in 1440 to Erlend Eindridsson (died c. 1452) and Gudrun Olavsdotter (c. 1415 – c. 1472). Her father was the last known male-line member of the Losnaætten family. Her family estate, Losnegard (Losnaætten), which she later inherited, was located on the island of Losna at the mouth of the Sognefjord in Sogn. After her father's death, her mother married Jon Svaleson Smør. She was commonly known as "Lady Ingerd the Elder" to distinguish her from her relative Inger Ottesdotter Rømer, the landowner of Austrått.

Her first marriage was to Olav Guttormsson (died before September 1485), who owned the Hananger estate in Lista. When he died, his estate went to his aunt Botild Svalesdotter, however, Erlendsdotter was given the right to dispose Hananger and the other farms Guttormsson owned during her lifetime. She married for the second time to armourer and Privy Councillor Arald Kane (died c. 1497). She remained childless after both of her marriages.

After her mother's cousin junker Hans Sigurdsson died childless in 1466, Erlendsdotter's mother became one of his three heirs to his large estates. However, the inheritance was not finalised until 1490. Erlendsdotter and her sister Sigrid were allocated Sigurdsson's Northern and North-West estates.

In about 1497, her second husband Arald Kane and his sons-in-law were murdered during an assembly in Sunnmøre. After his death, Erlendsdotter donated several of her properties in Nordmøre and Sør-Trøndelag to Nidaros Cathedral for an annual memorial for herself and her late husband.

At the end of her life, she felt the loss of her husbands and lack of children. In a letter to archbishop Olav Engelbrektsson in May 1526 in Bergen, she wrote that she felt like a "wild bird". Her closest helper was her great-nephew Otte Holgerssøn Rosenkrantz, who she called "my dear son". Erlendsdotter died in summer 1526, and the prospect of inheriting her assets affected the political acts of the nobility of Norway, Sweden and Denmark. But ultimately her inheritance was granted to Holgerssøn Rosenkrantz's children.
