= Battle of Hisar Firoza =

- Part of Campaigns of Babur
Date	26 February 1526
Location	Hisar, Delhi Sultanate
Result	Mughal victory

Belligerents
Timurids	Delhi Sultanate

Commanders and leaders
Babur; Humayun	Hamid Khan

Strength
Unknown but fewer	Unknown but more

Casualties and losses
Unknown	Unknown

The Battle of Hisar Firoza took place in Hisar, in the state of Haryana, India between Zahir-ud-din Muhammad Babur and Hamid Khan on 26 February 1526. Babur with his son Humayun clashed against the Afghans under the command of Hamid Khan. It was the first battle of Humayun and he was only eighteen years old back then. Humayun had a significant victory against Hamid Khan in the battle of Hisar Firoza.

== Background ==
Babur started conquering India around 1524–1526. Lodi dynasty, belonging to the Pashtun tribe (Afghan), was ruling the Delhi Sultanate at that time. Hisar was a very significant tactical focal point for Ibrahim Lodi who was the last sultan of Delhi sultanate from the Lodi dynasty. Prior to the First Battle of Panipat, Babur was marching towards Panipat to fight Ibrahim Lodi in 1526. But when Babur got to the Ghaggar-Hakra River, he was informed that Hamid Khan was leading his troops from Hisar Firoza towards him. Learning the news, Babur sent his son Humayun with an adequate number of soldiers to fight Hamid Khan.

== Battle ==
Sultan Ibrahim Lodi sent a second army led by Hamid Khan from Hisar Firoza, which is 100 miles to the north-west of Delhi, to weaken Babur's battle plan for Panipat. Babur went with Humayun to fight the army led by Hamid Khan on 26 February. When Humayun's army arrived near the position, Humayun sent off around 100 to 150 of his soldiers ahead of him. Hamid's army started fighting these soldiers and suddenly Humayun attacked with the rest of his army. Hamid Khan's soldiers became puzzled, they started fleeing the battlefield. Humayun's soldiers caught around 150 men of Hamid and 7-8 elephants. They beheaded almost half of the arrestees. It was Humayun's first battle as well as his first victory.

== Aftermath ==
On 2 March, the winning news came to Babur's camp. Babur rewarded the messenger a horse from the royal stable. Prince Humayun came back to the camp 5 March with around 100 of the captured soldiers and the elephants. The captured men were shot dead afterwards by Babur's matchlock men. Babur awarded the throne of Hisar to prince Humayun after his decisive win against Hamid Khan in the battle of Hisar Firoza. With the victory, Humayun made Babur's battle of Panipat easier. Ibrahim Lodi was lost in the first battle of Panipat to Babur and was killed in 1526. With the victory of the Panipat, Babur established the Mughal Empire in India.

== See also ==
- Babur
- Delhi Sultanate
- First Battle of Panipat
- Humayun
- Ibrahim Lodhi
- Lodi dynasty
