= Smør (noble family) =

- Nobility
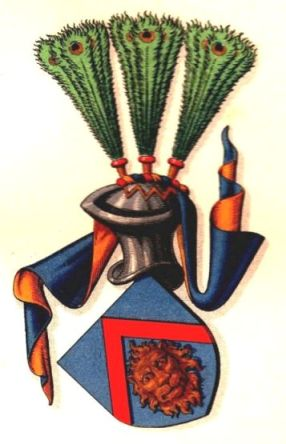
- Smør coat of arms.
- Country: Norway
- Titles: Regent of Norway; Knight
- Dissolution: 1483 (agnatic)

The Smør family, or after the coat of arms, "Leopard's head (under chevron)", was the name of a Norwegian medieval family of the high nobility. The family was one of the few original noble families of Norway, as it, unlike many other families, did not originate from Denmark or Sweden. The family owned land in Norway, as well as on the Faroe Islands and Shetland (which at the time was a Norwegian overseas possession). The male line of the family died out in the late 15th century.

Coat of arms of the Norwegian noble family Smør. based on drawing by Hallvard Trætteberg (1898-1987)

== Coat of arms ==
The coat of arms of the Smør-family had a blue background, and a golden Leopard's head under a red chevron. The family is sometimes alternatively called "Leopard's head (under chevron)" after the coat of arms.

== History ==
=== Name ===
The word "smør" is Norwegian for butter, which in the Norwegian Middle Ages was an item of payment, and often one of the standard products of paying taxes with. As such, the family was named after one of the most important goods in society.

The contemporary use of the family name Smør has been contested, as it has been suggested that the name was more of an epithet for only some of the members, as not all members of the family are known to have used it. Regardless, the, at least informal, use of the name Smør for the entirety of the family has, already since the 16th century, been a common standard.

=== People ===
The first person that can possibly (although disputed) be regarded as a member of the family was Jon Smør. He was a knight and riksråd (cabinet minister). The first positively known member of the family was Jon Hallvardson Smør.

The latter Jon's son, Svale Jonson Smør, is one of the more well-known members of the family, becoming important in Norway during the early 15th century. He was a knight and Lord of Bergenhus Fortress, and possibly the first to use Smør as a family name.

One of Svale's children was Jon Svaleson Smør, also a knight, riksråd, and in 1482 was promoted to the highest title known of a member of the Smør-family, as he was elected regent of Norway in the midst of a two-year interregnum. Jon, however, drowned the year after, in 1483, as the last man of the direct male-line of the family.

Through the female members of the family, the family survived by, among others, the noble families "Orm", Galte and Benkestok, into modern times. As such, some Norwegians, especially in Western Norway, can trace their ancestry back to some of the members of the Smør family.

=== Family tree ===
The following shows the family tree of the Smør-family: (Note that some uncertainty surrounds the first two generations; the following shows the most common rendering.)

Smør family tree

Jon Smør
Hallvard Jonson; Smør	Ølversdotter	Torgaut Jonson; Smør	Ragnvald Jonson; Smør
Jon Hallvardson; Smør	Hallkjell Hallvardson; Smør
Svale Jonson (Smør)	Sigrid Gunnarsdotter; Kane	Ulvhild Jonsdotter; Smør
Inga Svalesdotter (illegitimate)	Jon Svaleson; Smør	Bothilde Svalesdotter; Smør	Inga Svalesdotter; Smør

== See also ==
- Norwegian nobility

== Sources ==
- Handegård, Odd (2008). Vår felles slektshistorie. Hardanger, Sunnhordland og Ryfylke m.m. 1170-1650.
