= Jon Svaleson Smør =

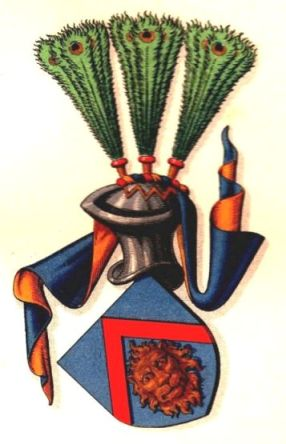
- Coat of arms of the Smør family (modern reproduction)

Regent of Norway
- In office 1481–1483
- Preceded by: Christian I
- Succeeded by: John

Personal details
- Born: c. 1420
- Died: 1483 Jarlsøy, Norway, Kalmar Union
- Cause of death: Drowning
- Spouse: Gudrun Olavsdotter (likely)
- Parents: Svale Jonson Smør (father); Sigrid Gunnarsdotter Kane (mother)
- Occupation: Nobleman, knight, feudal lord and statesman

Jon Svaleson Smør (c. 1420–1483) was a Norwegian knight, riksråd and regent.

Jon was a son of the knight Svale Jonson Smør and his wife Sigrid Gunnarsdotter Kane. He was a knight from 1449, and cabinet minister from 1458. In the 1470s he was a fehird (tax minister) and høvedsmann (lord) of the king's farm. Later, he was one of the main forces behind the reactivation of the Norwegian Riksråd at the death of King Christian I in 1481. As a riksråd, and from 1482 regent, he led the policy of the Riksråd to maintain Norway's political interests during the interregnum between 1481 and 1483.

Jon was probably after 1450 married to Gudrun Olavsdotter (c. 1415–1476/86), daughter of the knight Olav Håkonsson and Ingebjørg Jonsdotter. It is unknown if they ever had any children together. Jon died of drowning at Jersøy, near Tønsberg, the last man in the direct male line of the Smør family.

Jon Svaleson Smør Born: 1420 Died: December 1483
Regnal titles
Preceded by Christian I as King of Norway	Regent of Norway; 1481–1483	Succeeded by Hans I as King of Norway

== See also ==
- Smør
- Norwegian nobility

== Sources ==
- Handegård, Odd (2008), "Vår felles slektshistorie. Hardanger, Sunnhordland og Ryfylke m.m. 1170-1650", p. 109-111
- Opsahl, Erik, Jon Svalesson Smør – utdypning (NBL-artikkel), Store norske leksikon
