= Jon Hallvardson Smør =

Norwegian nobleman

Jon Hallvardson Smør (fl. 1375) was a Norwegian nobleman. He was a son of the knight Hallvard Jonson Smør. In 1375, Jon was the ombudsman of king Haakon VI of Norway. He had two known children, the son Svale, and daughter Ulvhild (whose granddaughter Birgitte married Trond Tordson Benkestok).

== See also ==
- Smør
- Norwegian nobility
