= Benkestok (noble family) =

- Nobility
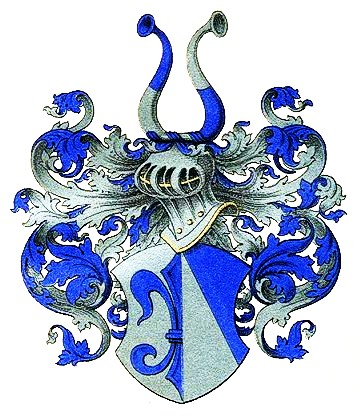
- Coat of arms of Benkestok
- Country: Norway
- Place of origin: Strand in Forshälla, Bohuslän
- Founded: 1100s (legendary); 1300 (first mention)
- Founder: Gaut at Ænes (legendary); Tord Benkestok
- Historic seat: Talgøy; Haraldseid; Jordanger; Meløya Farm
- Titles: Lendmann; Lensherre of Bergenhus; Knight

The Benkestok family (Benkestokk, Benchestoch et cetera) is one of the original noble families of Norway and one of the few to survive the Middle Ages. At the height of its power, the family ruled large estates in Båhuslen (today a part of Sweden), in Western Norway, in Northern Norway, in the Faroe Islands, and in Shetland.

== History ==
The family's progenitor is Tord Benkestok, who lived in Strand in Forshälla, Bohuslän, then a part of Norway. He was in the end of the 14th century mentioned in the Church Property Register by Øystein Aslaksson, Bishop of Oslo.

The family was married with members of other old families, among others Smør, Galte and Kane. The legendary ancestral father was Gaut at Ænes in Hardanger, born circa 1100. He was a lendmann (baron), and his son Jon Gautsson was a lendmann in the service of Magnus Erlingsson. The Benkestok family was allegedly the eighth generation descending patrilineally from Gaut.

Jon Tordsson Benkestok was the first known family member to move to Norway's largest and most important city at the time, Bergen. In a document of 1435, he was called Jon Þordasson Benkiastok when serving as a Judge of Peace.

Trond Tordsson Benkestok of Talgøy was in 1444 mentioned as he attended the Council of the Kingdom. On 4 December, he took part in a council meeting in Copenhagen, where a ruling by King Christopher on the right of Hanseatic merchants in Norway was confirmed. At the meeting, only twelve council members were present; five Lords of the Church and seven Lords of the Realm, of which Trond Benkestok was number six and with the title of knight. Trond, then in his late 20s, probably represented the Lord of Bohuslän, who was not present at the meeting. In 1472, he was still a knight and mentioned as a Judge of Peace at a court session in Trondheim concerning an inheritance.

Later members of the family lived in Ryfylke, where Talgøy in Sjørnarøyane and Haraldseid at Skjold were their seat farms, as well as at Jordanger in Sogn. A family member moved north to Meløya Farm in Meløya, Nordland, which marked the beginning of the expansion of the family in Northern Norway.

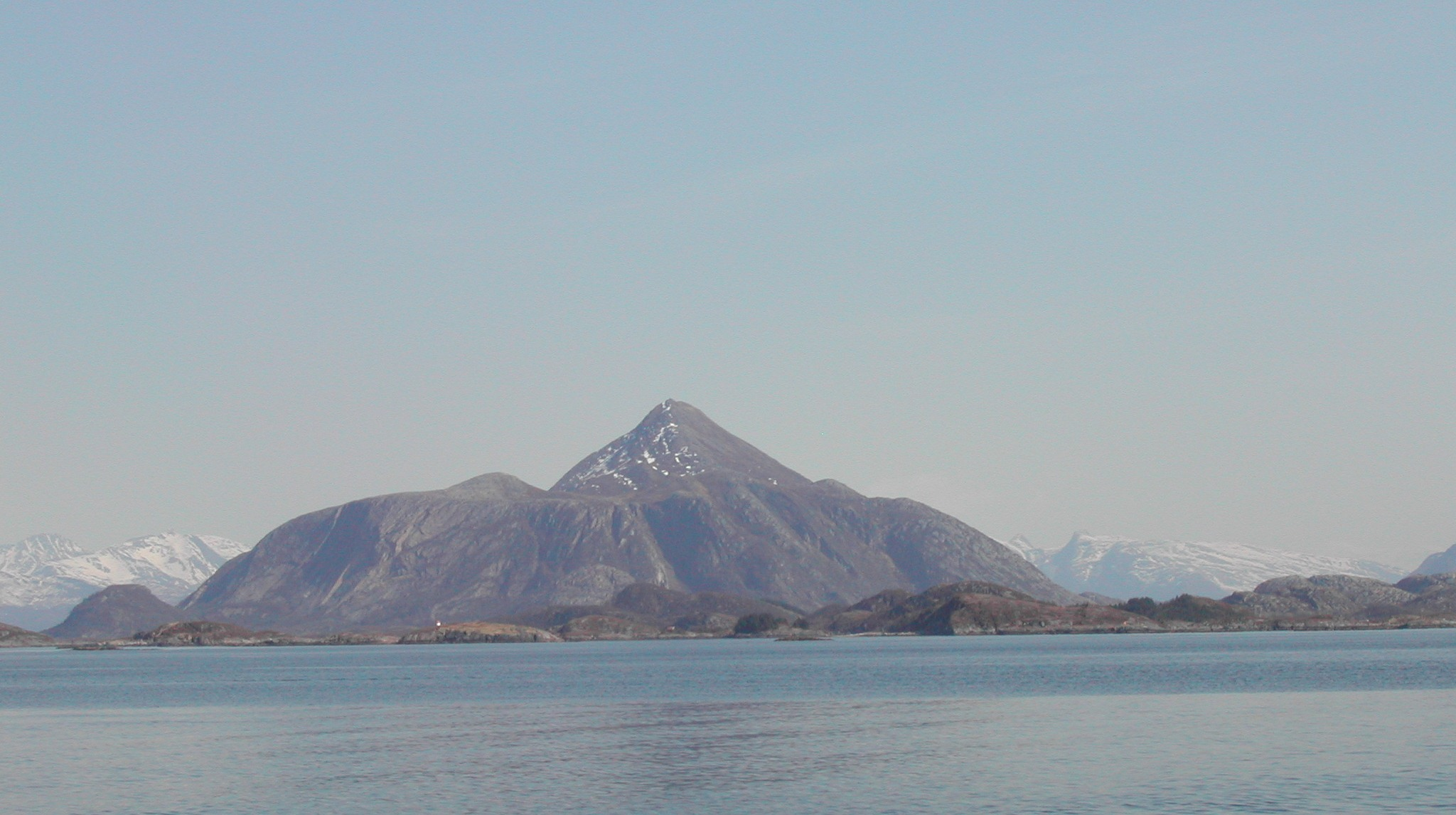
Meløya, to which Trond Torleivsson Benkestok came and took his seat. Photographer: Commons user Knut

In July 1532, King Christian II was arrested and imprisoned in Copenhagen. Trond Torleivsson Benkestok actively supported Johan Kruckow, who wanted Frederik I on the Danish and the Norwegian throne. Trond was later a knight. Claus Bille describes him as the ‘most respected and wise nobleman north of the mountains’. Trond was probably a supporter of the Roman Catholicism until the last Catholic archbishop, Olav Engelbrektsson, in 1537 fled the country.

Trond's oldest son, Jon Trondson Benkestok of Meløy (1530–ca. 1593), was a signatory when the Norwegian nobility in 1591 paid homage to King Christian IV at Akershus Castle. He signed the document using a signet ring with the family's arms.

Due to Jon Benkestok's marriage to a so-called unfree woman, Birgitte Nilsdotter, their children lost their noble status. Known children were Torolf († 1622; without children), Anders († after 1630; married, no known children), Trond († 1626; had a daughter), Johan (had a daughter), Tord, Christopher († after 1618; had two sons), Niels († after 1599), Anna († after 1599), and Margrethe Benkestok (several descendants). Trond Benkestok had the daughter Ermegaard Benkestok († 1696), who had descendants. Johan Benkestok had the daughter Anna Benkestok, who was married. Christopher Benkestok had presumptively two sons: Jens Christophersen Benkestok († after 1665) and Anders Benkestok († 1672). The two brothers were the last known male members of the family.

The younger Benkestok family was formed by Gunder Amundsen Benkestok and his children. He was a son of Ermegaard Benkestok's daughter Magdalena Jonsdatter. Gunder Benkestok arranged in 1753 on a voyage to Copenhagen, where he attempted to receive noble status for his family based on his cognatic descent from the old Benkestoks. However, he did not succeed. Additionally, another cognatic descendant, Jon Gundersen Benkestok, a first cousin of Gunder Benkestok, used this name.

== Name ==
The origin of the family's name, allegedly meaning ‘tree-trunk seat’, has not been established. According to a myth, the family's founding father saved the King of Norway from Swedish soldiers by hiding him in a wooden bench, wherefore he was rewarded with noble status, name, and arms.

== Coat of arms ==
The family's coat of arms is divided per pale. The dexter field has on a background Azure a half lily Argent. The sinister field is divided party per bend, where the lower part is Argent and the upper part is Azure. Being reminiscent of a tree trunk, the latter is probably an allusion to the family name.

== See also ==
- Norwegian nobility
- Nordland families

== Literature ==
- Brandt, Wilhelmine: Slægten Benkestok (facsimile edition 1997), Damms antikvariat, Oslo ISBN 82-90438-07-9 ib. Sidetall: 332. Original ed.: Christiania 1904.
- Suhm's Samlinger til den Danske Historie, volume II, pagina 99.
- Danmarks Adels Aarbog, 1887 edition
- A. Thiset og P.L. Wittrup: Nyt dansk Adelslexikon, Copenhagen 1904
- Sven Tito Achen: Danske adelsvåbener, Copenhagen 1973
