= Torleiv Trondson Benkestok =

Norwegian nobleman

Torleiv Trondson Benkestok (fl. 1502) was a Norwegian nobleman.

Torleiv was a son of the nobleman Trond Tordson Benkestok and Birgitte (probably Torleivsdotter Kjællingmule). Torleiv is mentioned in only one known source while alive, at a sentence in Bergen in 1502. He is here titled as "velbåren mann" ("well-born man"), which means he must have held a title higher than that of a væpner (squire). He must also have held a royal office, as well as being born into nobility.

Torleiv was married to Adelus Eriksdotter Kruckow. Together they at least had the son Trond.

== Sources ==
- Vigerust, Tore H.(1999) Benkestokk-seminaret p. 18
