= Brodtkorb =

- Nobility
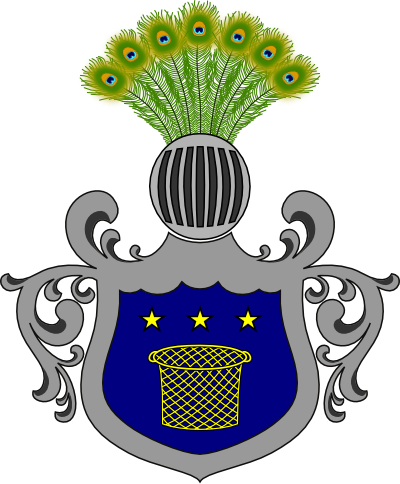
- A modern presentation of the Brodtkorb coat of arms
- Country: Norway; Germany
- Founder: Tobias Brodtkorb
- Estate: Tjøttagodset

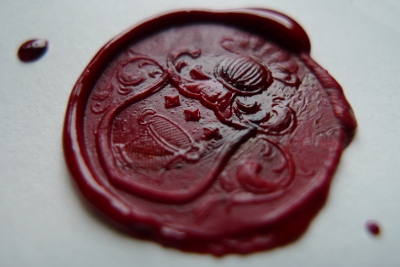
The family arms in a wax seal from 2011

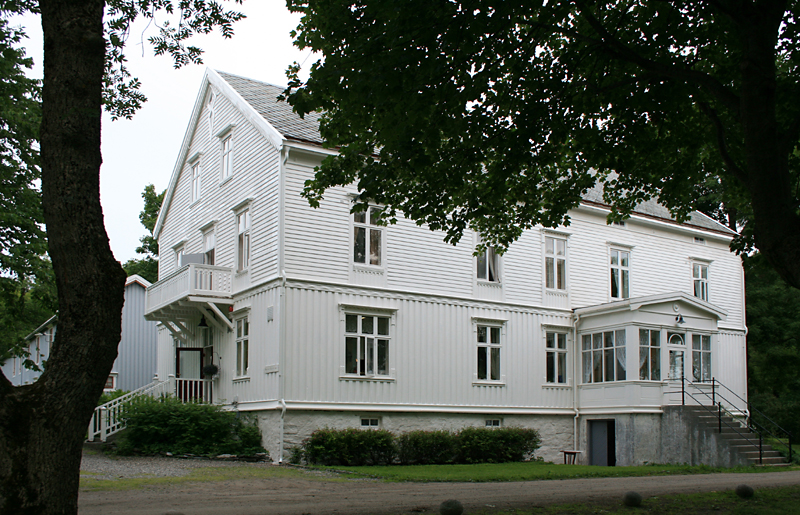
Manor house at Tjøtta

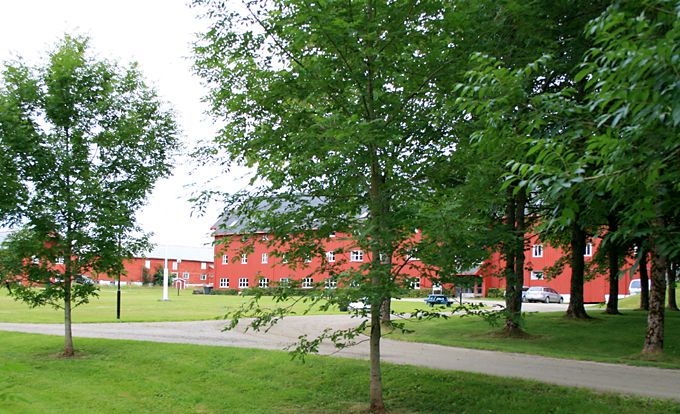
From Tjøtta

The Brodtkorb family is a Norwegian noble family of German origin. According to legend, the family was ennobled in Germany with a bread basket in its coat of arms. The ennoblement is said to have taken place as a sign of honour after an ancestor in Germany, in times of need, donated all his possessions to the public and thereby filled the public breadbasket.

== History ==
It has its origins in Saxony, Germany. The family first came to Norway in 1643 with Tobias Brodtkorb († 1676), who was a coin-writer (Norwegian: myntskriver) in Akershus county and later a customs and export officer in Fredrikstad. His son was Christian Brodtkorb (1653–1701), goldsmith in Oslo, and his grandson was Tobias Brodtkorb (1685–1763), whose three sons established the family's principal branches:

- Eilert Christian Brodtkorb (1721–1806), weigher and measurer in Kristiansund.
- Christian Johannes Brodtkorb (1725–97), captain and owner of Kirkesæter Farm (Kirkesæter gård) in Hemne.
- Niels Gierbrandt Brodtkorb (1729–96), council of justice and owner of Tjøtta Farm (Tjøttagodset) and estate in Alstahaug.

== Brodtkorb of Tjøtta ==
=== Estate owners ===
The family's most prominent branch was the Brodtkorbs of Tjøttagodset. In 1767, Niels Gierbrandt Brodtkorb purchased the large estate on the island of Tjøtta in the parish of Alstahaug. He married Anna Catharina Hvid, who was the daughter of Johan Christian Hvid, owner of the Tromsø estate (Tromsøgodset), and granddaughter of Michael Hvid, who had been the manager of the same estate, originally a part of the Baron of Westervick's estate in Northern Norway.

Their son Johan Christian Hvid Brodtkorb (1766–1845) took over the Tjøtta estate. Through his marriage to Maren Winther, who was the daughter of estate owner Niels Winther and Anne Bech in Vevelstad, Brodtkorb extended the property with more land. Thereafter followed their son, Niels Gerbrand Winther Brodtkorb (1792–1865) married to Marie Berg, who was the daughter of Johan Ernst Berg, County Governor of Nordland. Their son was Johan Christian Brodtkorb, who became the last estate owner at Tjøtta.

=== Bankruptcy ===
When the last proprietarian, Johan Brodtkorb the younger, died on 3 July 1918, the estate was bankrupt. One sought to let Brodtkorb relatives buy the estate, and in accordance with a property deed of 1867, they had pre-emption to Tjøtta Farm. This attempt did not succeed. The final auction was held in 1929, when the government, represented by the Ministry of Agriculture, bought the farm for 83,000 crowns (90,000 crowns including various fees).

The manor's interior, however, had been sold one year earlier in an auction lasting for seven days. The manor was then basically emptied for old and valuable objects, thereafter transported to other parts of the country. Among the most precious items were a cabinet from 1627 belonging to Overlord of Helgeland Peter Jacobsen Falch and Anna Jonsdotter of Tjøtta Farm (Tjøtta gard), a collection of over 700 books, whereof many were old and written by hand, and a heraldic artwork displaying the Brodtkorb coat of arms. Also silver, china, and renaissance furniture were sold for relatively low prices.

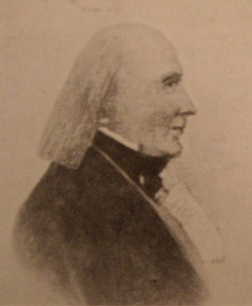
Johan Brodtkorb the older (1766–1845), proprietarian and owner of the Tjøtta estate, and candidatus juris.

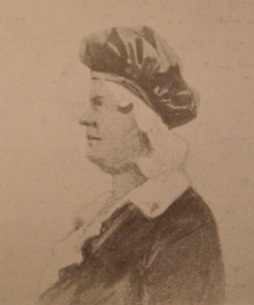
Maren Brodtkorb, née Winther, daughter of proprietarian Niels Frantzen Winther and Anne Tøgersdatter Bech.

== Genealogy ==
The family lineage dating back to 1643, the year in which Tobias Brodtkorb came to Norway, is documented in a work of 1904 by Antoinette Augusta Gram, née Brodtkorb. Prior to 1643, the family name appears among matriculated students at the University of Leipzig. There is also a digital version of the lineage.

Brodtkorb of Tjøtta

- Niels Gierbrandt Brodtkorb (1729–96), ∞ Anna Catharina Hvid
  - Johan Christian Hvid Brodtkorb (1766–1845), ∞ Maren Greger Winther
    - Niels Gierbrandt Winther Brodtkorb (1792–1865), ∞ Marie Berg
      - Johan Christian Brodtkorb

== Family name ==
The German noun Brotkorb, which until the 1800s was spelled Brodtkorb, means 'breadbasket'.

== Family coat of arms ==
Various arms have been used by family members. The use of the family's present coat of arms may be traced back to the 1700s.

Description: A golden basket under three golden stars. Upon the helm seven green peacock feathers.

== Selection of prominent family members ==
- Birger Brodtkorb (1891–1935), of the Tjøtta branch, athlete
- Eilif Brodtkorb (b. 1936), rower
- Kari Nissen Brodtkorb (b. 1942), architect
- Reidar Brodtkorb (1909–81), author
- Thor Brodtkorb (1907–83), ambassador to Austria

== Literature and sources ==
- Hans Cappelen, Norske slektsvåpen (Norwegian Family Coats of Arms), Oslo 1969 (2nd ed. 1976), p.72
- Store norske leksikon: Brodtkorb
- Wikipedia, Norwegian Bokmål & Riksmål: Brodtkorb
- Wikipedia, Norwegian Bokmål & Riksmål: Tjøttagodset
