= Torgaut Jonson Smør =

Norwegian nobleman and cabinet minister

Torgaut Jonson Smør (fl. 1353–1373) was a Norwegian nobleman and riksråd (cabinet minister).

Torgaut was probably the son of the knight Jon Smør. According to historian P. A. Munch, Torgaut may have had his home in Borgsyssel. He did at least own land in Romerike, Oslo syssel and in Vestfold. He was in queen Blanche of Namur's service in 1353, and riksråd in 1369. In the years 1371-73 he was hirdstjore (governor) of Iceland. Torgaut was probably married to Gjertrud Guttormsdotter. Together they had the sons Klas and Eiliv, and the daughter Ulvhild.

== See also ==
- Smør
- Norwegian nobility

== Sources ==
- Handegård, Odd (2008), "Vår felles slektshistorie. Hardanger, Sunnhordland og Ryfylke m.m. 1170-1650", p. 109
