= Fehirde =

A fehirde (Old Norse: féhirði) was a term used in the Norwegian Middle Ages, equaliant of a "tax minister" or "royal treasurer". Under the rule of Haakon V of Norway in the early 14th century, the country was divided into five fehirdsler. These were Oslo, Tønsberg, Bergen, Trondheim and Båhus, each under the administration of a separate fehirde.

== Sources ==
- Caplex, fehirde
- Ordnett.no, fehirde
