= Andreas Gaill =

Jurist of the Holy Roman empire (1526–1587)

Andreas von Gail (Andreas Gaill)
- Freiherr
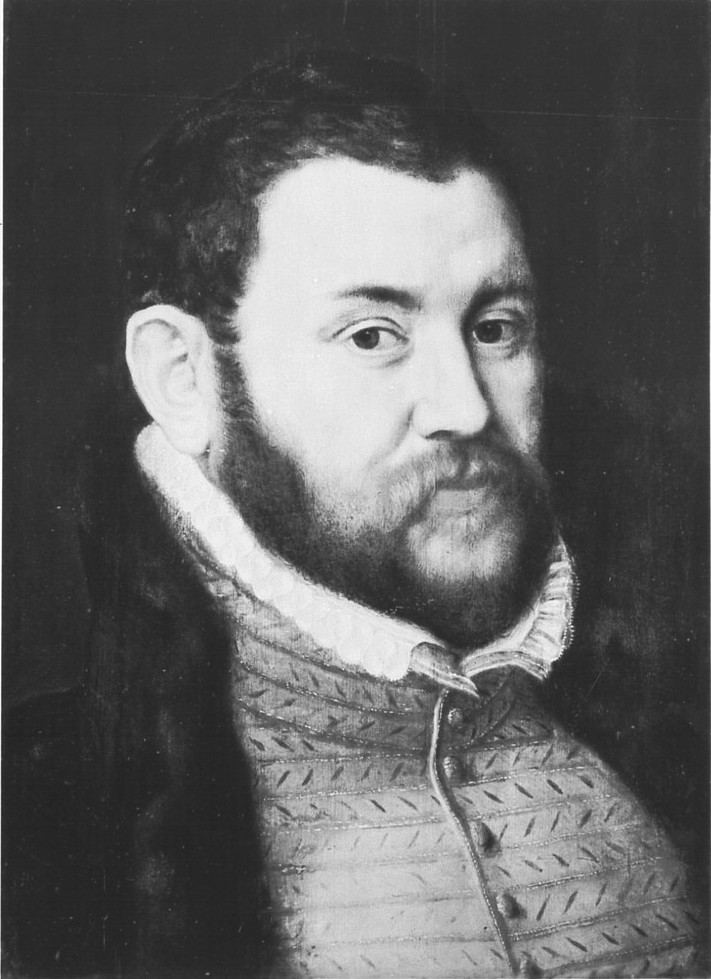
- Andreas von Gail ca. 1560 by Pieter Pourbus

- Coat of arms
- Born: 12 November 1526; Cologne
- Died: 11 December 1587 (aged 61); Cologne
- Father: Philippe I von Gail
- Occupation: jurist and diplomat

Andreas Gaill (12 November 1526 – 11 December 1587) was one of the leading jurists of the Holy Roman Empire.

After studies in Cologne, Orléans, Leuven and Bologna, Gaill worked as an advocate in his hometown Cologne. In 1558, he was appointed to the Imperial Chamber Court. From 1569 on, he served on the Aulic Council in Vienna and, prior to his death, as Chancellor to the Elector of Cologne.

Gaill is best remembered for his 1578 work Practicae observationes ad processum iudiciarium imperialis camerae, the first systematic compilation of Chamber Court jurisprudence. It exerted an eminent influence on the practice of law in the Empire and served as a template for most later German compilations of court decisions.
