= Svale Jonson Smør =

Hr. Svale Jonson Smør (c. 1380 – aft. 1442) was a Norwegian knight and riksråd (cabinet minister).

Svale was a son of the royal ombudsman Jon Hallvardson Smør. He was one of the most powerful men in Norway in the early 15th century. He lived in Bergen, and in 1404 was the lord of Bergenhus Fortress. In the mid-1420s Svale functioned as a riksråd and participated in settling numerous cases between Norway and Scotland. He is further mentioned as a knight in 1442, when he was present at the royal coronation of Christopher of Bavaria in Oslo.

Svale was married to Sigrid Gunnarsdotter Kane, and in 1412 inherited Hatteberg by Sigrid's uncle Gaute Eirikson of the Galte-family. Together Svale and Sigrid had a son Jon, and daughters Bothilda and Inga. In addition, Svale had another daughter, also called Inga (whose great-granddaughter married into the Orm-family) by an otherwise unknown frille (concubine).

== See also ==
- Smør
- Norwegian nobility

== Sources ==
- Handegård, Odd (2008), "Vår felles slektshistorie. Hardanger, Sunnhordland og Ryfylke m.m. 1170-1650", p. 109
