= Trond Torleivsson Benkestok =

Norwegian knight and feudal lord

- Born: 1495; Bergen, Norway
- Died: 14 February 1558 (aged 62–63); Vanse, Norway
- Occupations: Land owner, knight, feudal lord
- Spouse: Anna Jonsdotter Haar (ca. 1510 - 1567)
- Children: Tord Benkestok; Jon Trondson Benkestok; Adelus Benkestok; Kristin Benkestok; Brynild Benkestok

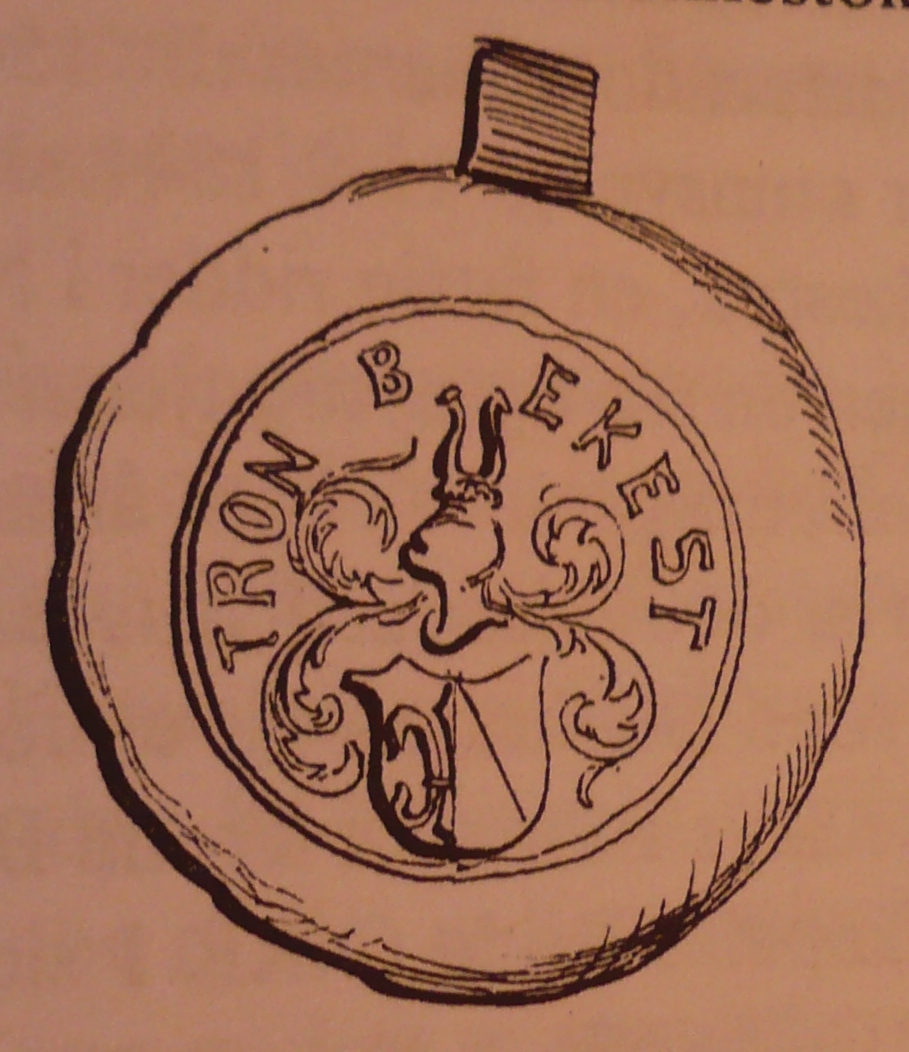
Seal of Trond Benkestok from 1534. National Archives in Oslo

Trond Torleivsson Benkestok (c. 1495 – 14 February 1558) was a Norwegian land owner, knight, and feudal lord (lensherre) of Bergenhus Fortress.

== Biography ==
Benkestok was born around 1495 (or before 1500) in Bergen to nobleman Torleiv Trondson Benkestok and Adelus Eriksdotter Kruckow. In 1532, he actively supported Johan Kruckow, who wanted Frederick I rather than King Christian II on the Norwegian throne. In July 1532, Christian II was captured and imprisoned. As Frederick I won the struggle, Benkestok was awarded the title of squire (væpner). He was probably a supporter of Roman Catholicism until the last Catholic archbishop Olav Engelbrektsson fled Norway in 1537.

Among other places, he owned a lot of land at Meløya in Nordland (Meløy – gård) which he had as his main farm from no later than 1540. In 1541 he received taxes from Meløy chapel and from Sunnfjord len. He was awarded Sunnmøre len, the land of Stigten in 1547, and around the same time he was also promoted to knight.

In 1555 he took charge of Bergenhus Fortress and in the years 1555-56 he was commander-in-chief during the absence of commander Christoffer Huitfeldt (c. 1500–1559). Claus Bille once described Benkestok as the "most respected and wise nobleman North of the mountains".

Benkestok was married to Anna Jonsdotter Haar (ca. 1510 - 1567), with whom he had sons Tord and Jon Trondson Benkestok and daughters Adelus, Kristin and Brynild. He died in Vanse, Norway, 14 February 1558.

== See also ==
- Benkestok (noble family)

== Other sources ==
- Brandt, Wilhelmine (original edition: 1904, facsimile ed: 1997) Slægten Benkestok (Oslo: Damms Antikvariat AS) ISBN 82-90438-07-9
