= Galtung =

Galtung is a surname. Notable people with the surname include:

- Galtung (noble family)
- Johan Galtung (1930–2024), Norwegian sociologist and mathematician
