= Tronka =

Tronka may refer to:

- Tronka, Trondheim, asylum building
- Tronka (novel) (The Sheep's Bell), Ukrainian-language novel by Oles Honchar 1963
