= Ole Peter Riis Høegh =

Norwegian architect (1806–1852)

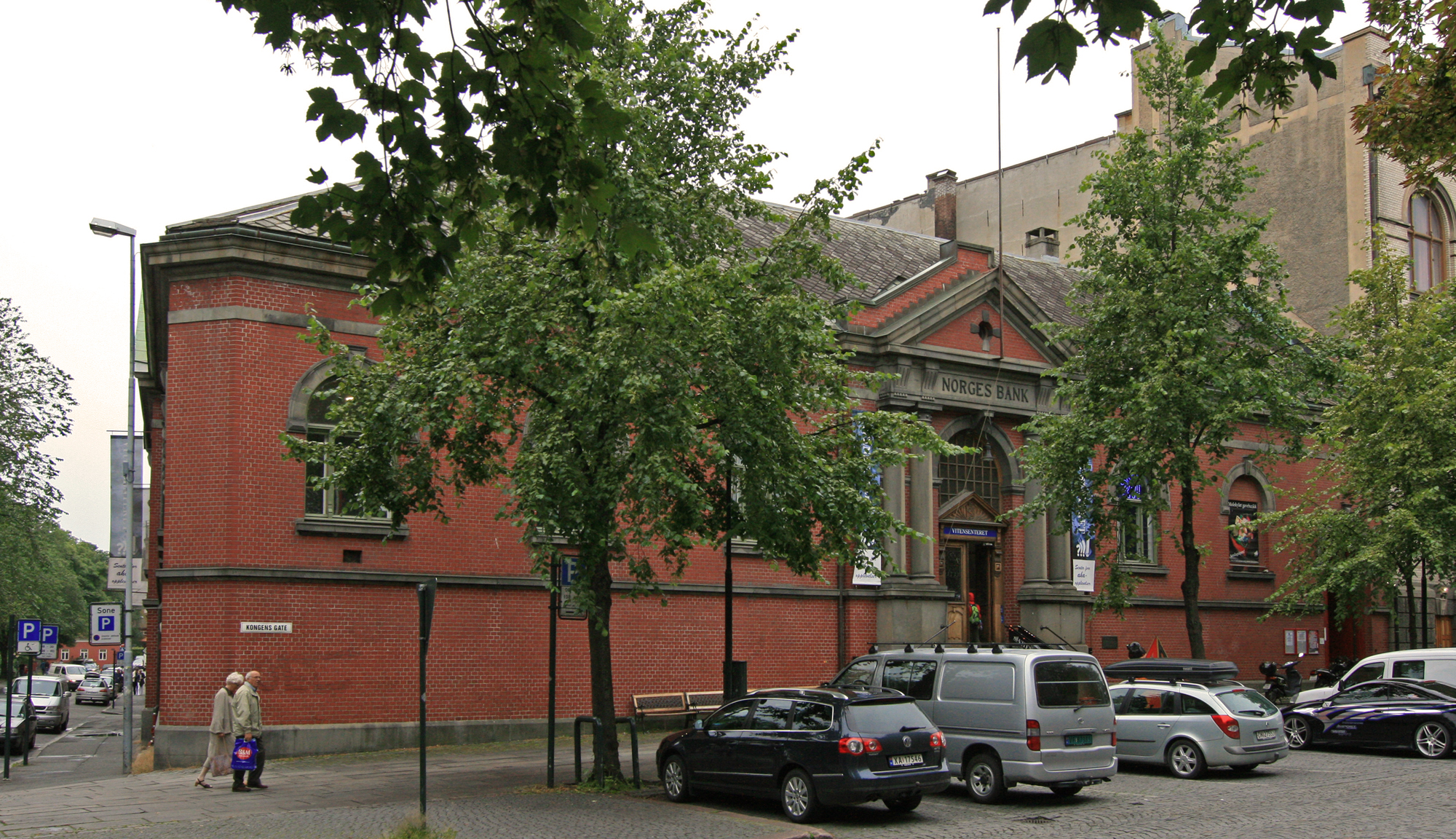
Former Bank of Norway main office on King Street (Kongens gate) in Trondheim, built by Høegh in 1830–1831

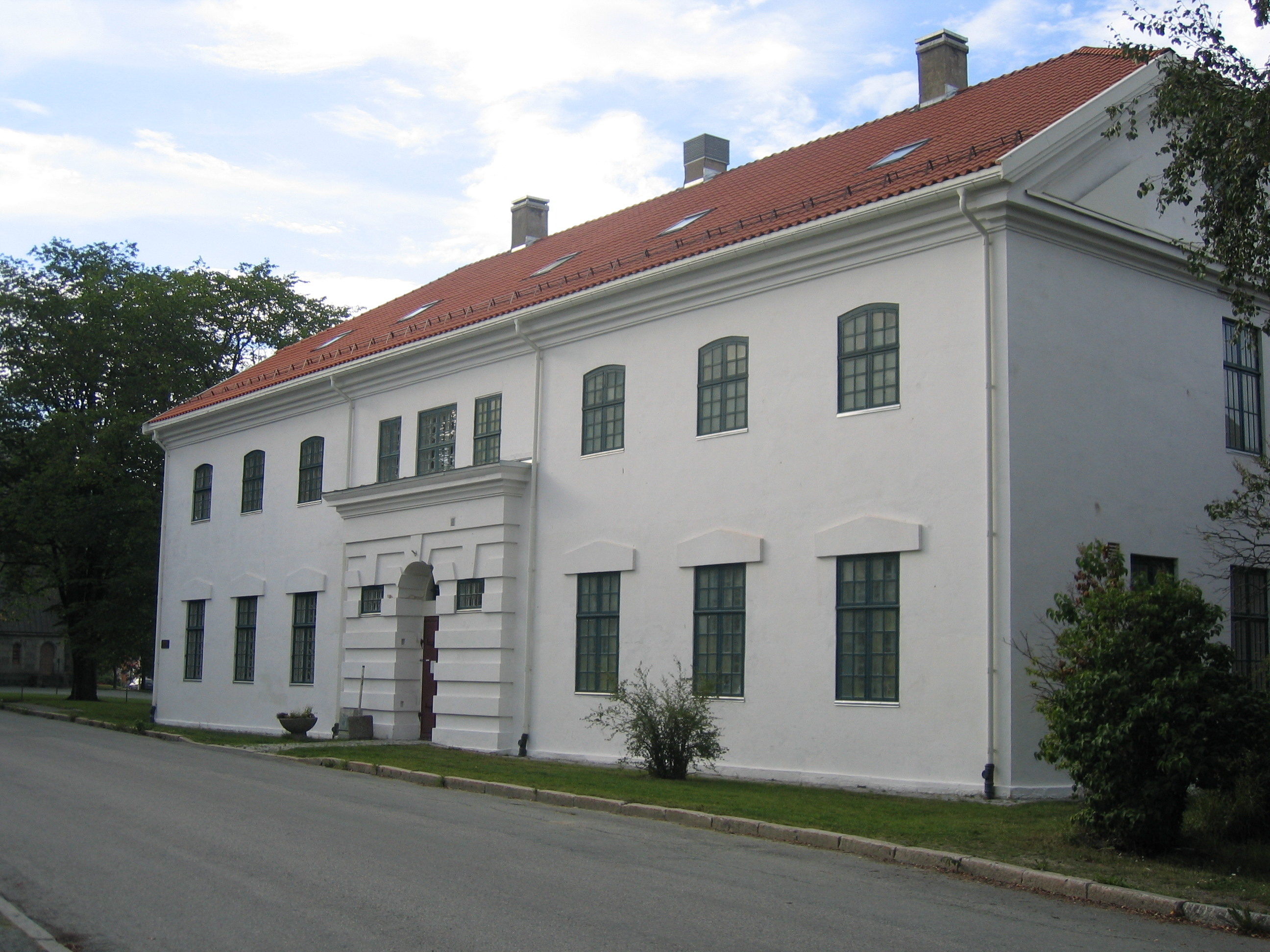
National Museum of Justice in Trondheim, built by Høegh in 1833

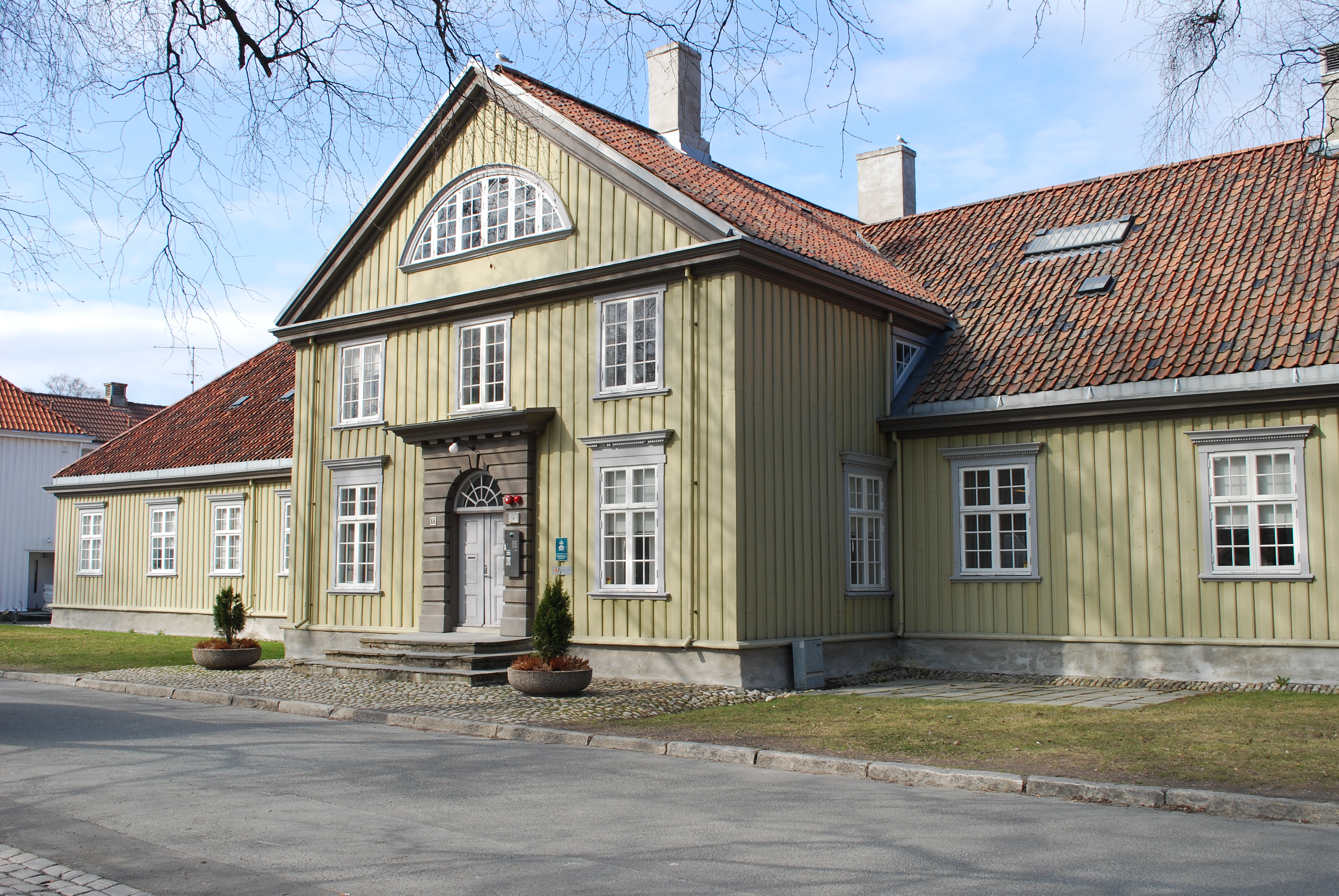
Tronka asylum in Trondheim, built by Høegh in 1836–1842

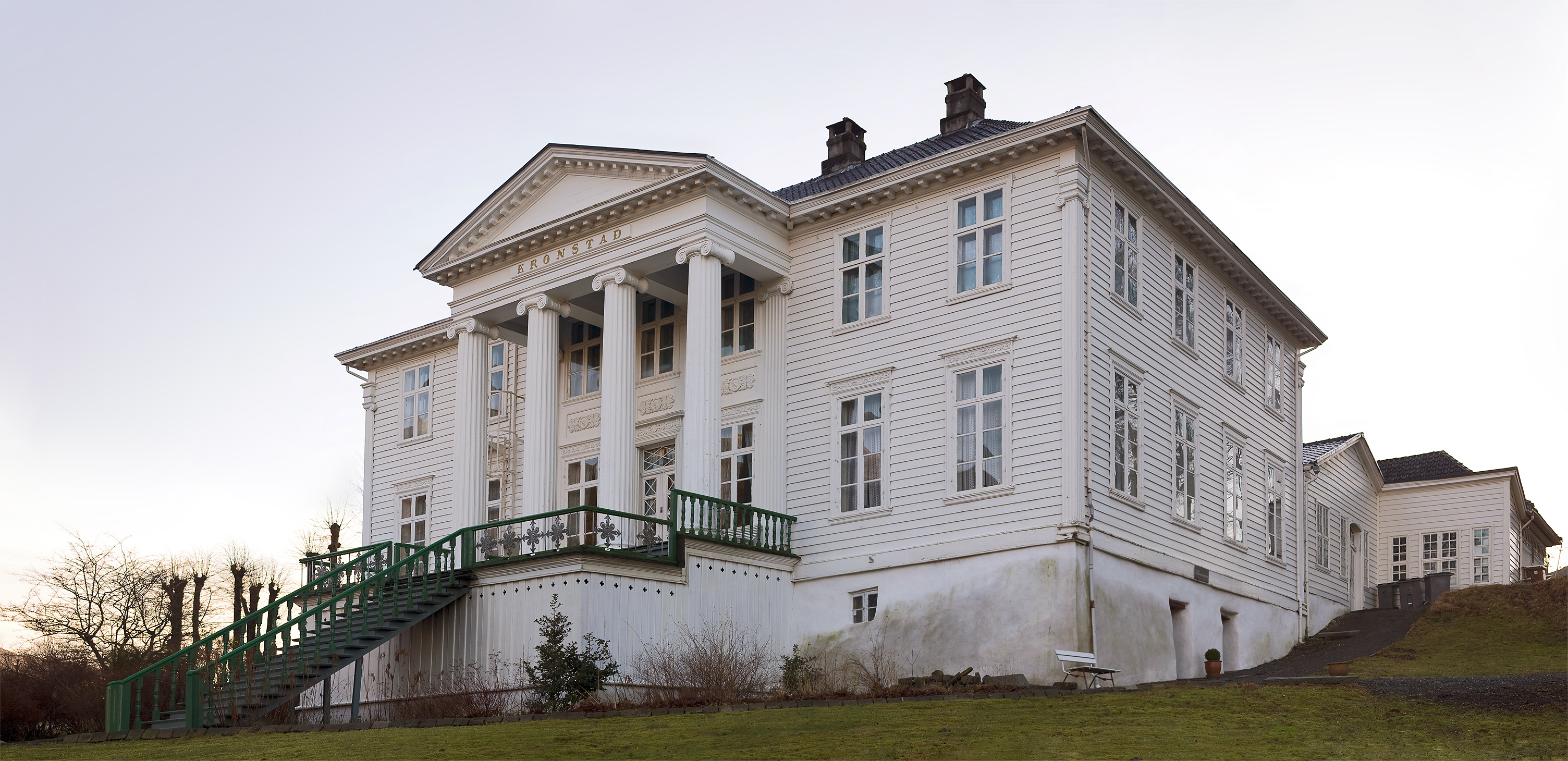
Kronstad Manor, given its current form by Høegh in the 1840s

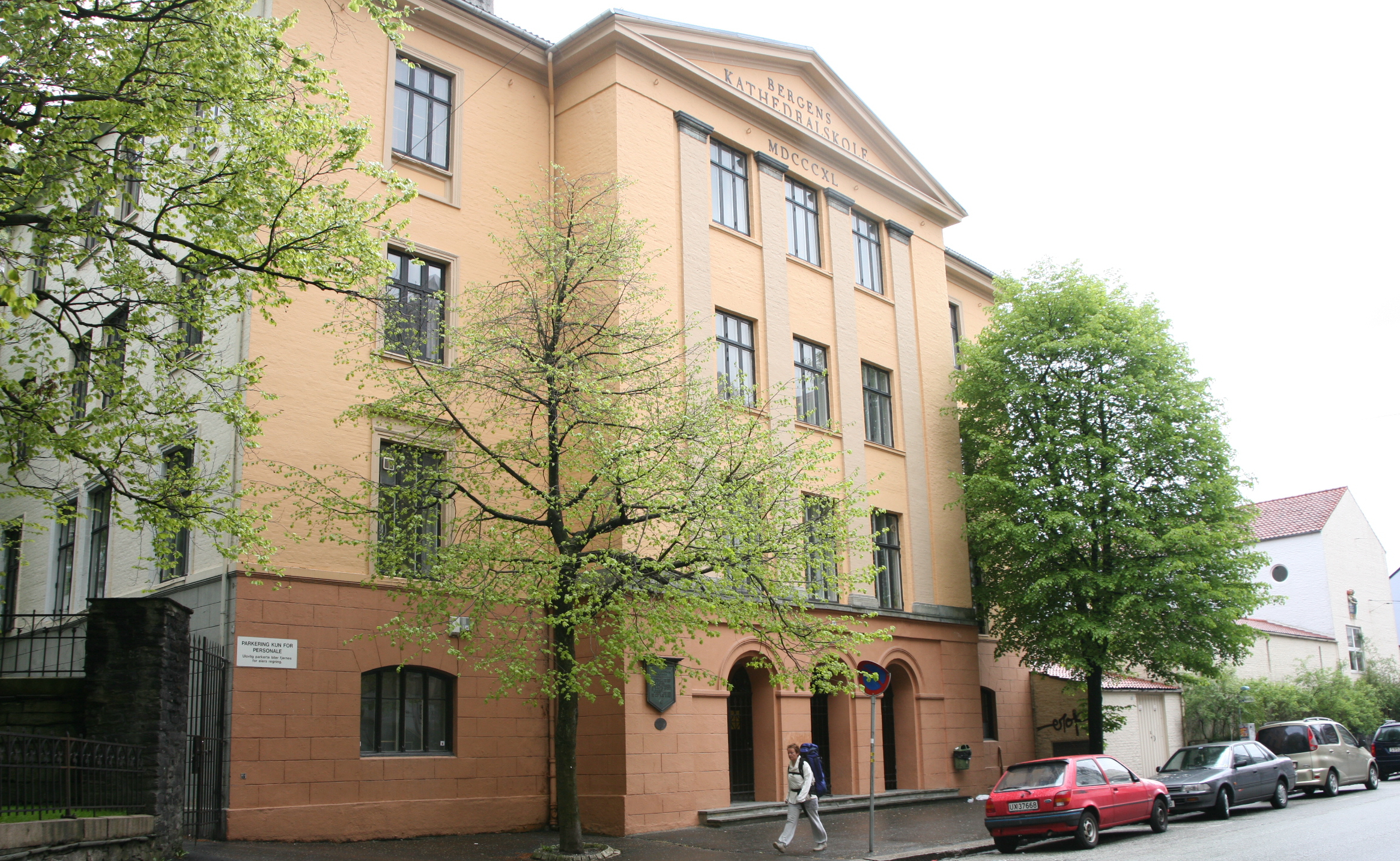
Bergen Cathedral School, designed by Høegh in 1840

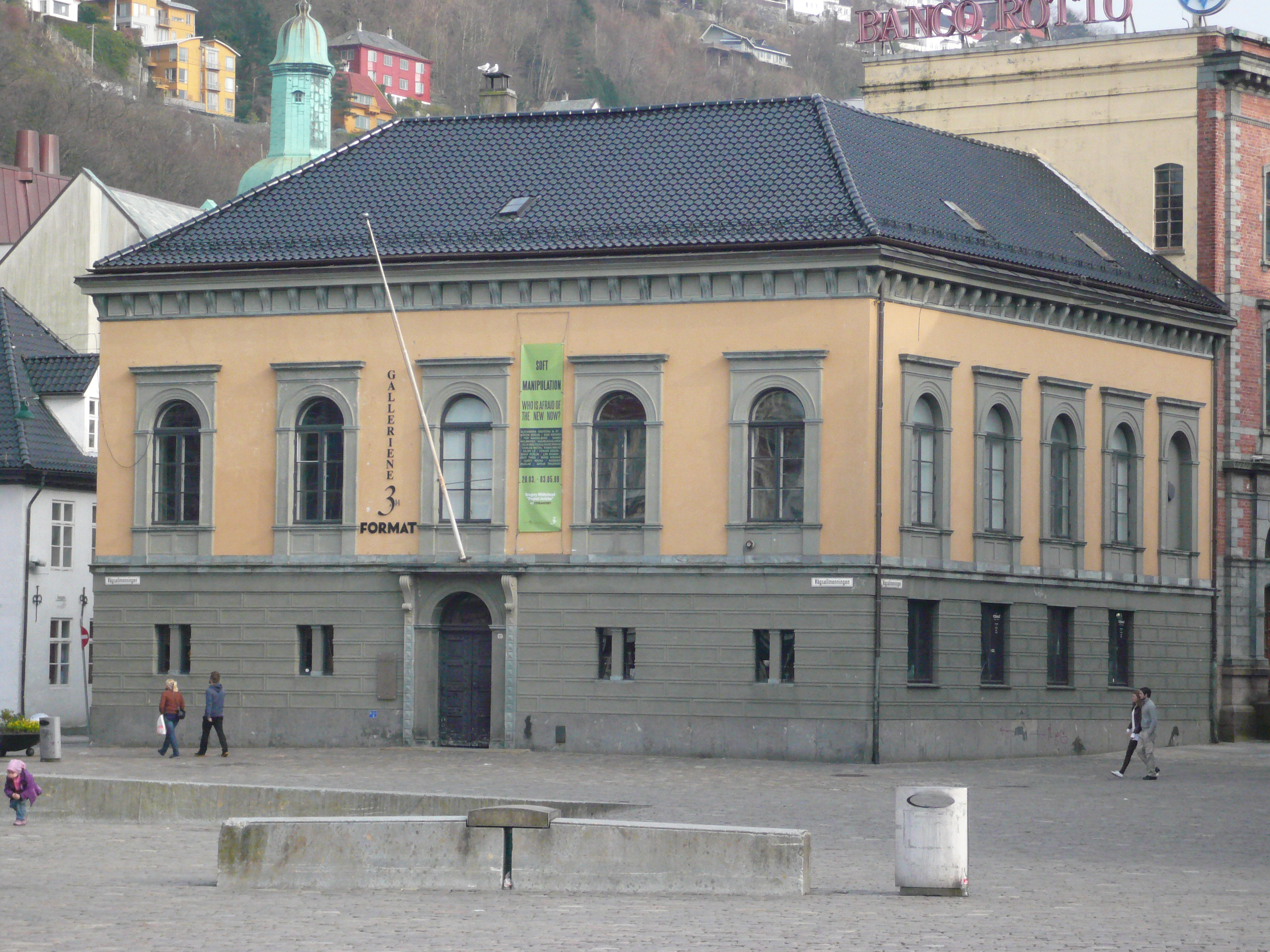
Bank of Norway branch office in Bergen, built 1840–1845

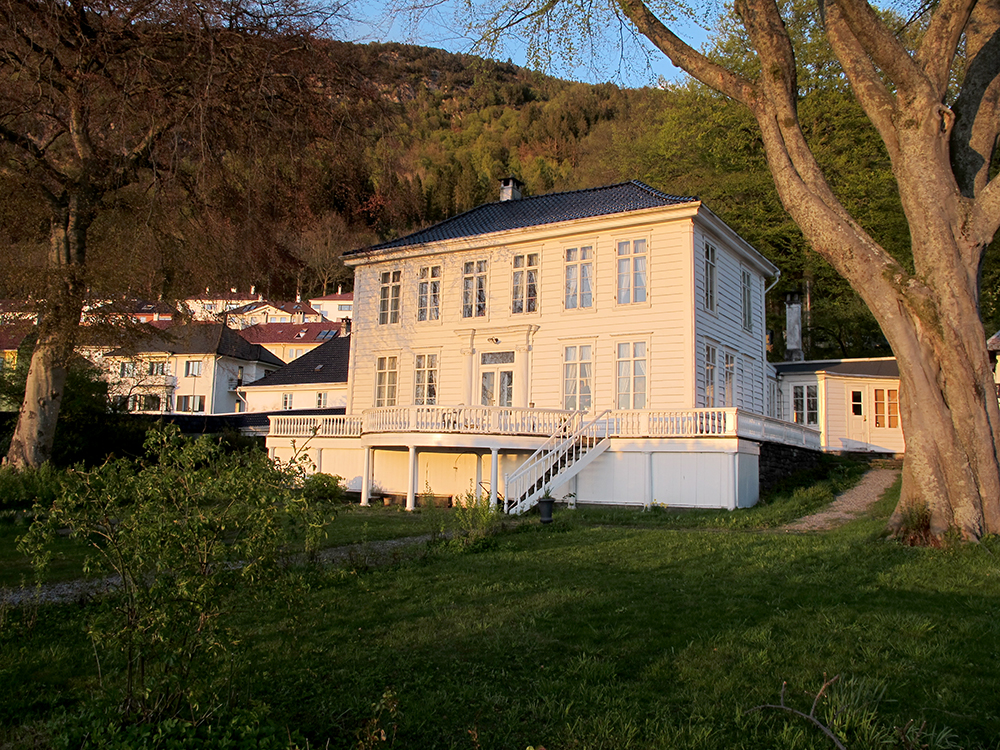
Christinegård Manor House in Bergen, built ca. 1836

Ole Peter Riis Høegh (July 27, 1806 – March 1, 1852) was a Norwegian architect who was one of Norway's first trained civilian architects and was Bergen's first town surveyor. Høegh was born in Grue, Norway. He designed several significant buildings in Bergen and Trondheim. Stylistically, Høegh's architecture is characterized by Neoclassicism, but also contains early touches of Historicism. He died in Bergen.

== Early life ==
Høegh received his first training in architecture under the architect Jørgen Gerhard Løser. After this, he studied at the Royal School of Drawing under Hans Linstow. In 1823, Høegh was hired by Linstow as a draftsman for the Royal Palace. In 1825 and 1826 he was a supervisor at Hadeland in charge of quarrying soapstone for the palace. As Linstow's assistant, he was involved in the plans for Grue Church, and created drawings for details and the interior. He worked as an assistant to Linstow until 1828, when he replaced Christian Heinrich Grosch as town surveyor in Christiania (now Oslo). From 1829 to 1830, he worked as a foreman in the construction of Immanuel Church and the secondary school in Frederikshald (now Halden) based on designs by Grosch.

== Trondheim ==
In 1830, Høegh moved to Trondheim, where he was responsible for a number of important construction projects over the next five years. Both the forced-labor prison (now the National Museum of Justice) and the Military Hospital were built based on Høegh's plans. The former Bank of Norway main office was built from 1830 to 1832. In cooperation with Gustav Adolph Lammers, Høegh designed the Tronka asylum (built from 1836 to 1842). In 1834, he was involved in the construction of a new Gothic vault in the octagon of Nidaros Cathedral and he prepared a proposal for needed repairs. In 1835 he submitted the first proposal for replacing the cathedral dome.

== Bergen ==
By 1832, Høegh had been appointed town surveyor in Bergen, but he did not take office there until 1835 because of all of the commissions that he had in Trondheim. The biographer Arno Berg writes that "On the whole, I believe that during the years Høegh was working in Bergen he was engaged in scattered building activities, with some prominent architecture in the city and its vicinity in his hands." There is no doubt that all of the manor houses attributed to him, including Urdi House, Christinegård Mansion, Helland House and Wernersholm, truly are his work.

The buildings in Bergen attributed to him with greater certainty were designed between 1836 and 1845, and they show the influence of German Romantic Classicism. In 1836 and 1837, Høegh traveled for study in Copenhagen, Hamburg, Berlin, and Potsdam, and his later architecture shows the strong influence of leading German architects such as Karl Friedrich Schinkel.

Høegh received a number of important commissions in Bergen, but today most of these have either been demolished or heavily rebuilt. His two best-preserved structures are Bergen's new secondary school (the Bergen Cathedral School), built in 1840, and the Bank of Norway branch office, built between 1840 and 1845.

== Death ==
Høegh eventually had trouble making a living as an architect. By 1848 he was ill, his wife had died, and he was forced to sell his house. In 1849 he was declared insane, and the following year he was placed under guardianship. He died two years later, at the age of 44.

== Selected works ==
- Bank of Norway main office (now the Trondheim Science Museum), at King Street (Kongens gate) 1, Trondheim, 1830–1831 (completed after preliminary work by the architect Johan Christopher Ræder).
- Tronka asylum (originally the Trondheim Hospital Care Foundation for the Feeble Minded, Trondhjems Hospitals Pleiestiftelse for Sindssvage), Erling Skakke Street (Erling Skakkes gate) 66, Trondheim, 1836–1842 (together with Gustav Adolph Lammers). The building was damaged by fire in 1995.
- Bergen Cathedral School, King Oscar Street (Kong Oscars gate) 36, Bergen, 1840. One story has been added to the building.
- Care Foundation for the Incurable Feeble Minded (Pleiestiftelsen for uhelbredede Sindssvage), an insane asylum next to the old hospital in Bergen's Engen borough, 1843.
- Bank of Norway branch office, Station Square (Vågsallmenning) 12, Bergen, 1845 (reworked by Schak Bull in 1926).
