= Christinegård =

Manor house in Bergen, Norway

Coordinates: 60.4067°N 5.3285°E

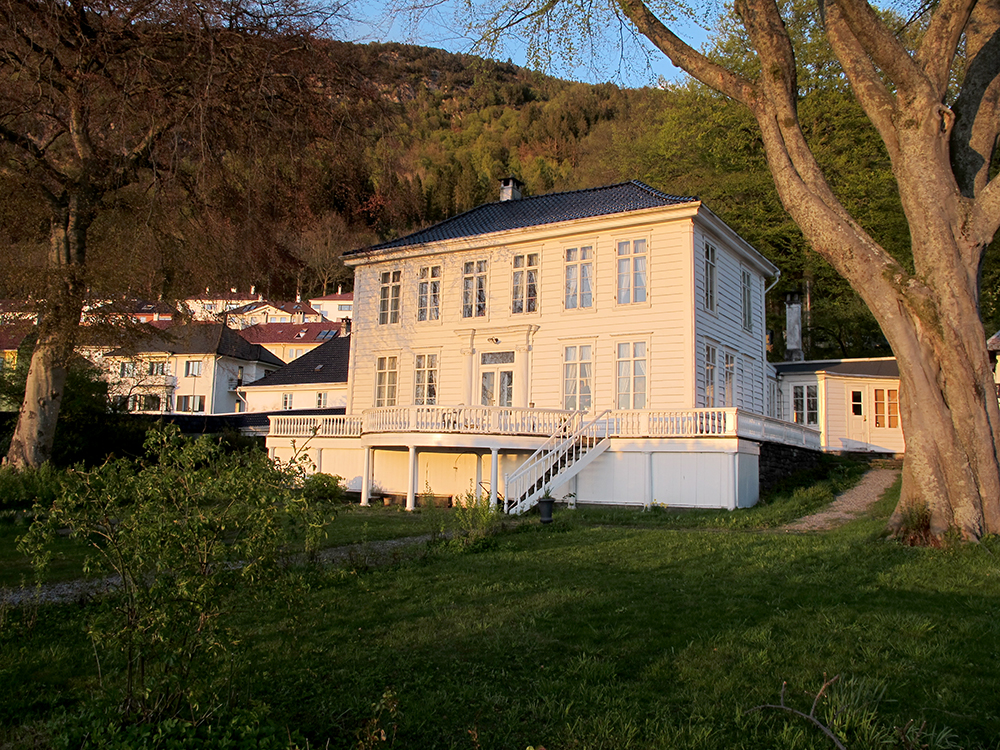
Christinegård anor House

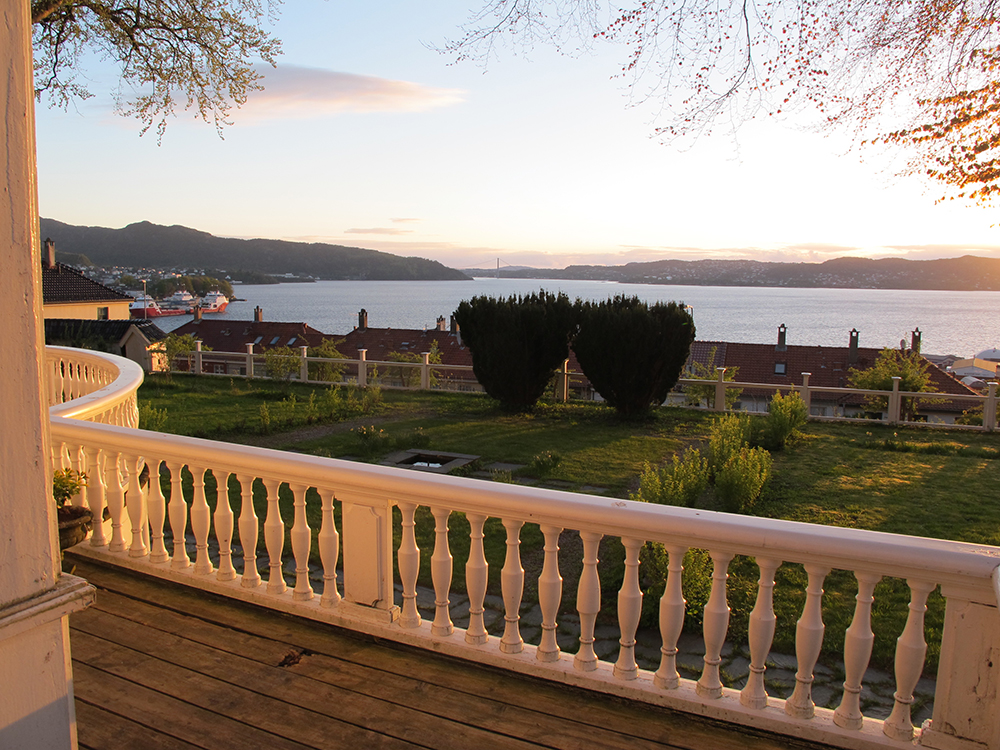
Christinegård Balcony View

Christinegård (also known as Christinelyst and Prahlgården) is a manor house located in the neighborhood of Sandviken in Bergen, Norway. The villa has a dominant position in the hillside overlooking Byfjorden.

== History ==
The main building was originally constructed as a country home around 1763 for Modesta Hansdatter Formann. Christinegård was sold in 1822 to Michael Djurhus Prahl (1781-1851), a Bergen merchant and later Member of the Norwegian Parliament. At the end of the 1830s the manor house was largely rebuilt in Empire style architecture. The distinctive design and the many motifs reflect the influence of the architect, Ole Peter Riis Høegh (1806- 1852).

From 1934 to 1958, this was the residence of the Bishop of the Diocese of Bjørgvin. Archaeologist Asbjørn Herteig (1919–2006) took over Christinegård in 1960. He resided there until his death in 2006.
