= Asbjørn Herteig =

Norwegian anthropologist and archaeologist (1919–2006)

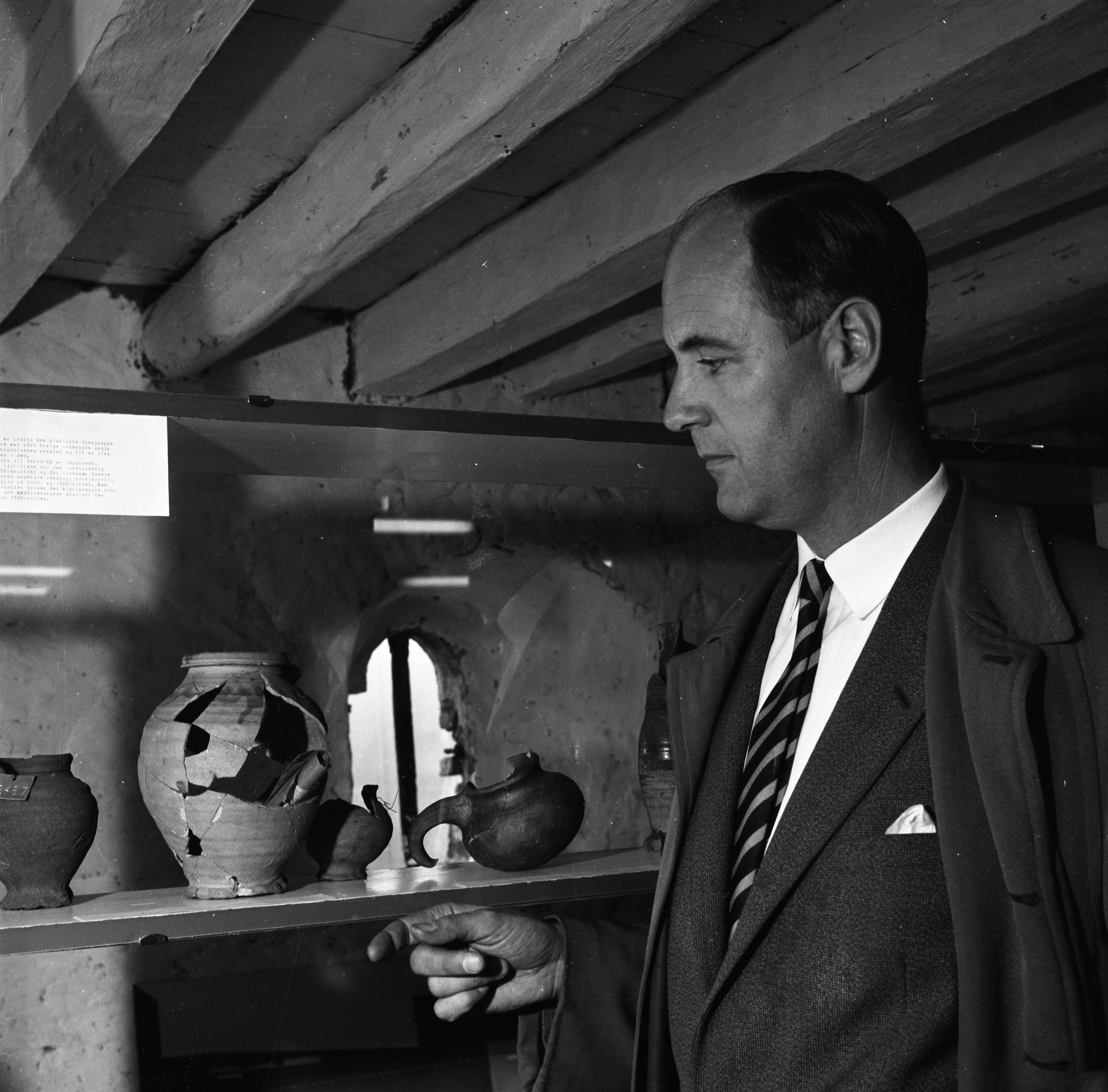
- Born: 15 February 1919; Hadsel, Norway
- Died: 2 October 2006 (aged 87)
- Education: University of Oslo
- Occupation: Archaeologist
- Awards: Order of St. Olav (1970)

Asbjørn Herteig (15 February 1919 – 2 October 2006) was a Norwegian archeologist. He was the first curator at the Bryggen Museum and affiliated with the University of Bergen.

== Biography ==
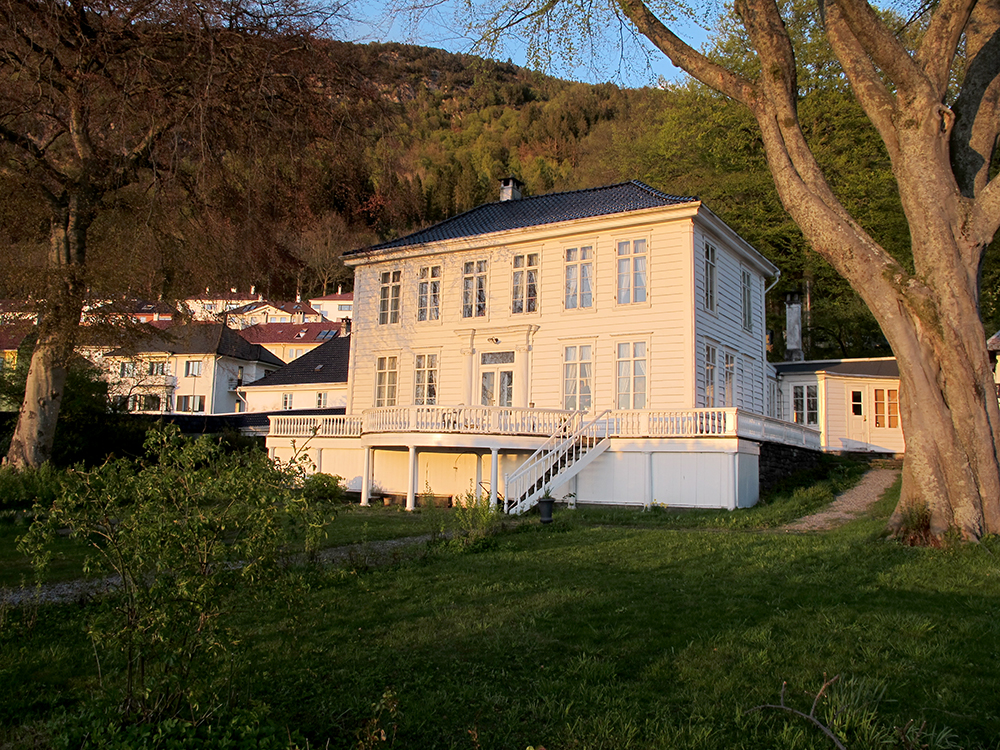
Christinegård in Sandviken

He was born in Hadsel Municipality in Nordland, Norway. In 1952, he took his magister degree in archeology at the University of Oslo. Through this work, Herteig was a pioneer in the field of Norwegian medieval era archeology. Herteig worked with excavations of Kaupanger on the island of Veøya. In particular, he was associated with the excavations of Bryggen in Bergen. Herteig was one of the co-founders of and organisers of Bryggens Museum. He also played a crucial role in the founding of Friends of Bryggen.

He was decorated Knight, First Class of the Order of St. Olav in 1970. Until 1999, Herteig was director of the Bryggen Foundation (Stiftelsen Bryggen). From 1960 until his death in 2006, he resided at Christinegård in the Bergen neighborhood of Sandviken.

== Selected works ==
- Bryggen i Bergen (1961)
- The Bryggen Papers (1985)
- The Bryggen Papers (1985)
- A Medieval Brewery (1988)
- The Buildings at Bryggen (1990 - 1991)

== See also ==
- Bryggen inscriptions

== Other sources ==
- Excavation of 'Bryggen', the old Hanseatic Wharf in Bergen
