= Bryggens Museum =

Museum in Bergen, Norway

Coordinates: 60.39838°N 5.32277°E

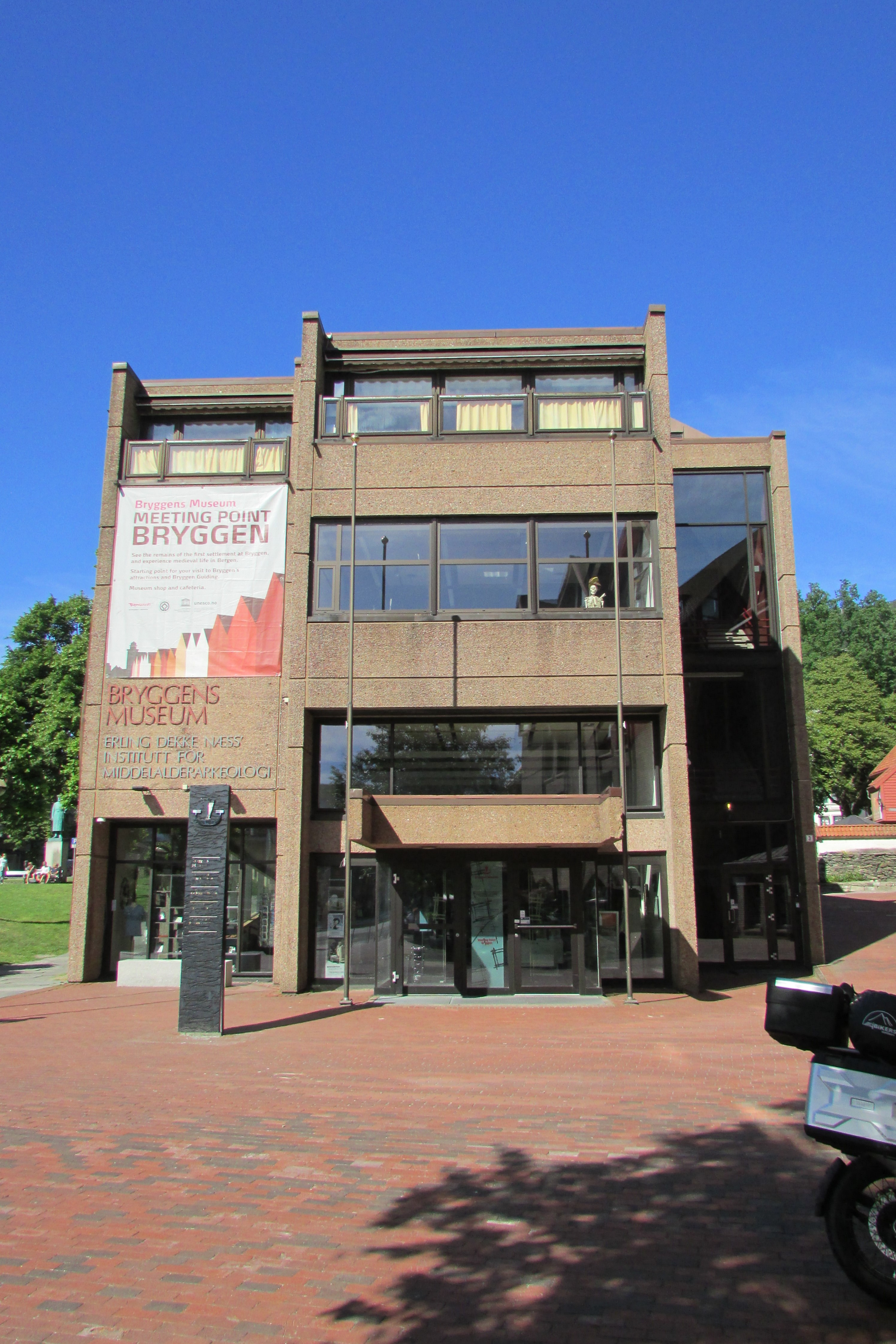
Bryggens Museum

Bryggens Museum is a museum located in Bergen, Norway.

During 1955, parts of the historic district of Bryggen were ravaged by a fire. During subsequent archaeological excavations a number of objects were uncovered, providing an insight into commerce, shipping, handicrafts and everyday life during the Medieval Period. Many of these artifacts now form the basis of the modern museum and are permanently exhibited. Additionally, the museum also has changing exhibits.

Bryggens Museum was established during 1976. The architect behind the design work was Øivind Maurseth, who also designed the nearby Radisson SAS Hotel. Archeologist Asbjørn Herteig was the first curator at the Bryggen Museum. Bryggens Museum has been part of Bergen City Museum since 2005.

== See also ==
- Bryggen inscriptions
