= Helland House =

House in Bergen, Norway

Coordinates: 60°20′49.016″N 5°20′18.715″E

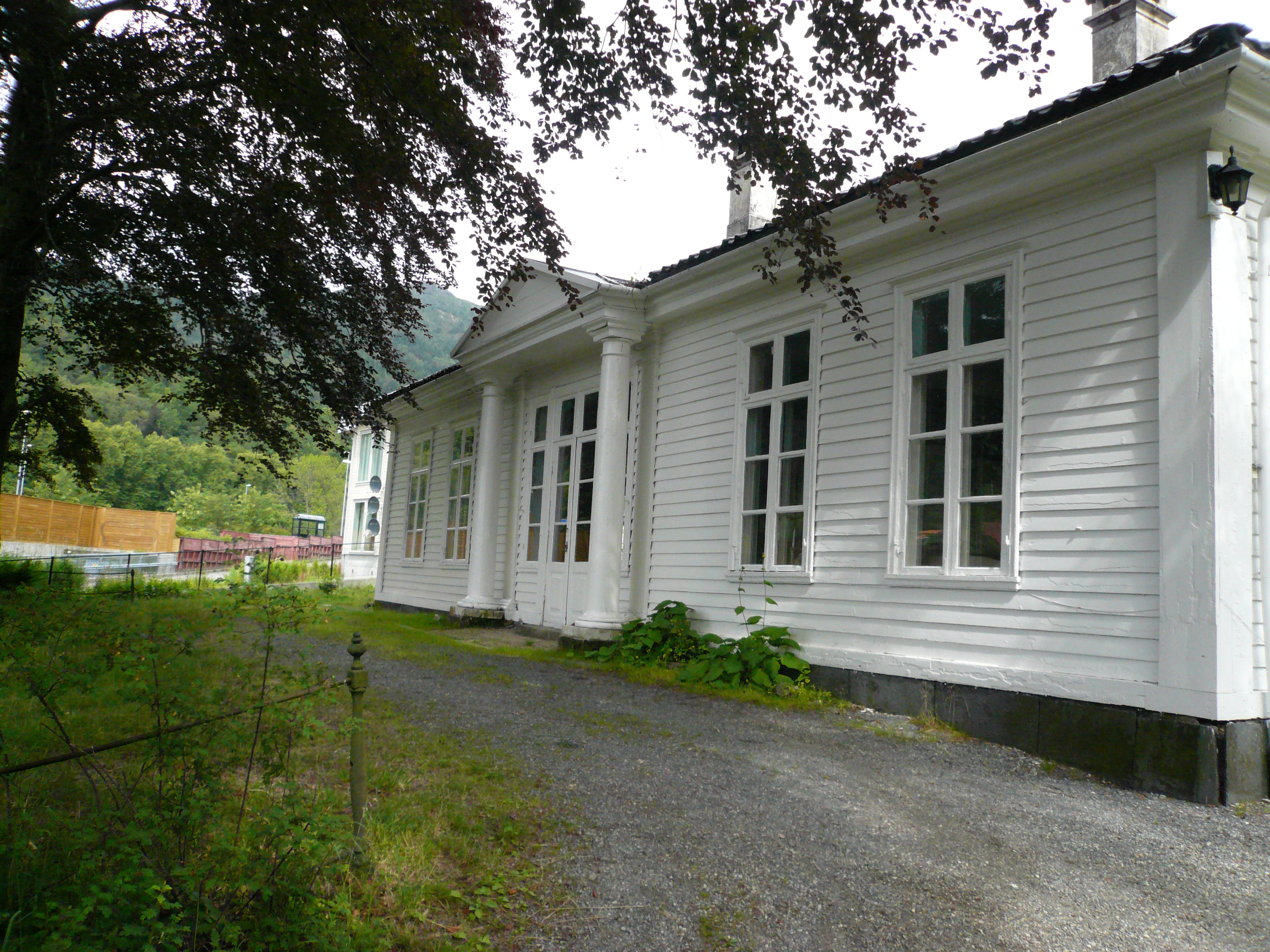
The Helland House

The Helland House (Norwegian: Hellandshuset) is a historic house in Bergen, Norway.

The structure in located on Nyhauglia near Fjøsangerbukten along the southern main entrance to Bergen. It stands in the vicinity of Gamlehaugen, the king's official residence in Bergen.

The house was built on the site of the former Nyhaugen farm (Nyhaugen. nr. 15, navnegård i Fana) for renter Gerhard Krohn after he acquired the property in 1841. The house was designed in the Late Empire architecture style. It has a black glazed tile-covered hipped roof and a main facade characterized by a single temple-front design with two Doric pillars. The design has been attributed to the architect Ole Peter Riis Høegh.

The house was given its current name after wealthy ship owner Peter Helland (1847–1935) purchased it around 1889. The property was later owned by journalist Rachel Catharine Grepp (1879–1961), daughter of Peter Helland and wife of politician Kyrre Grepp (1879–1922). In 2008, the property was sold by her grandson Kyrre Grepp, the son of Ole Grepp (1914–1976).

The building was given protected heritage status by the Norwegian Directorate for Cultural Heritage in 1924. The carriage house and servant quarters were given protected status in 1971. A privately run preschool operated in part of the building until 2014.
