= Kalvskinnet =

Neighborhood in the city of Trondheim, Norway

Kalvskinnet Kalvskinn
- Neighborhood in Trondheim
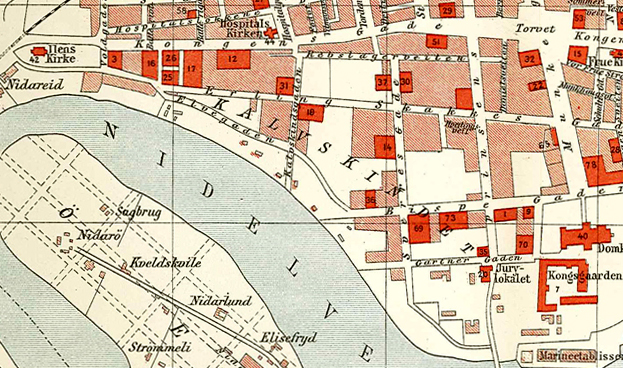
- Map of the neighborhood (1898)
- Interactive map of Kalvskinnet
- Coordinates: 63.4276°N 10.3902°E
- Country: Norway
- Region: Central Norway
- County: Trøndelag
- Municipality: Trondheim Municipality
- Borough: Midtbyen
- Elevation: 14 m (46 ft)
- Time zone: UTC+01:00 (CET)
  - Summer (DST): UTC+02:00 (CEST)

Kalvskinnet is a neighborhood in the city of Trondheim in Trøndelag county, Norway. It is situated southwest of the city centre in the borough of Midtbyen in Trondheim Municipality, bordering the river Nidelva in the south. The area is dominated by public offices, including such institutions as the Norwegian University of Science and Technology (including Sør-Trøndelag University College which was merged into IT), and Trondheim Science Museum. There is also some quite expensive housing located in this area, characterized by buildings from the last century.

The present name first occurs in 1556. In Sverris saga, the location was called akeren. In 1179, Kalvskinnet was the site of the Battle of Kalvskinnet (Slaget på Kalvskinnet) between King Sverre Sigurdsson and Erling Skakke.
