= Immanuel Church, Halden =

Coordinates: 59°7′16.216″N 11°23′27.650″E

Immanuel Church
- Immanuels kirke
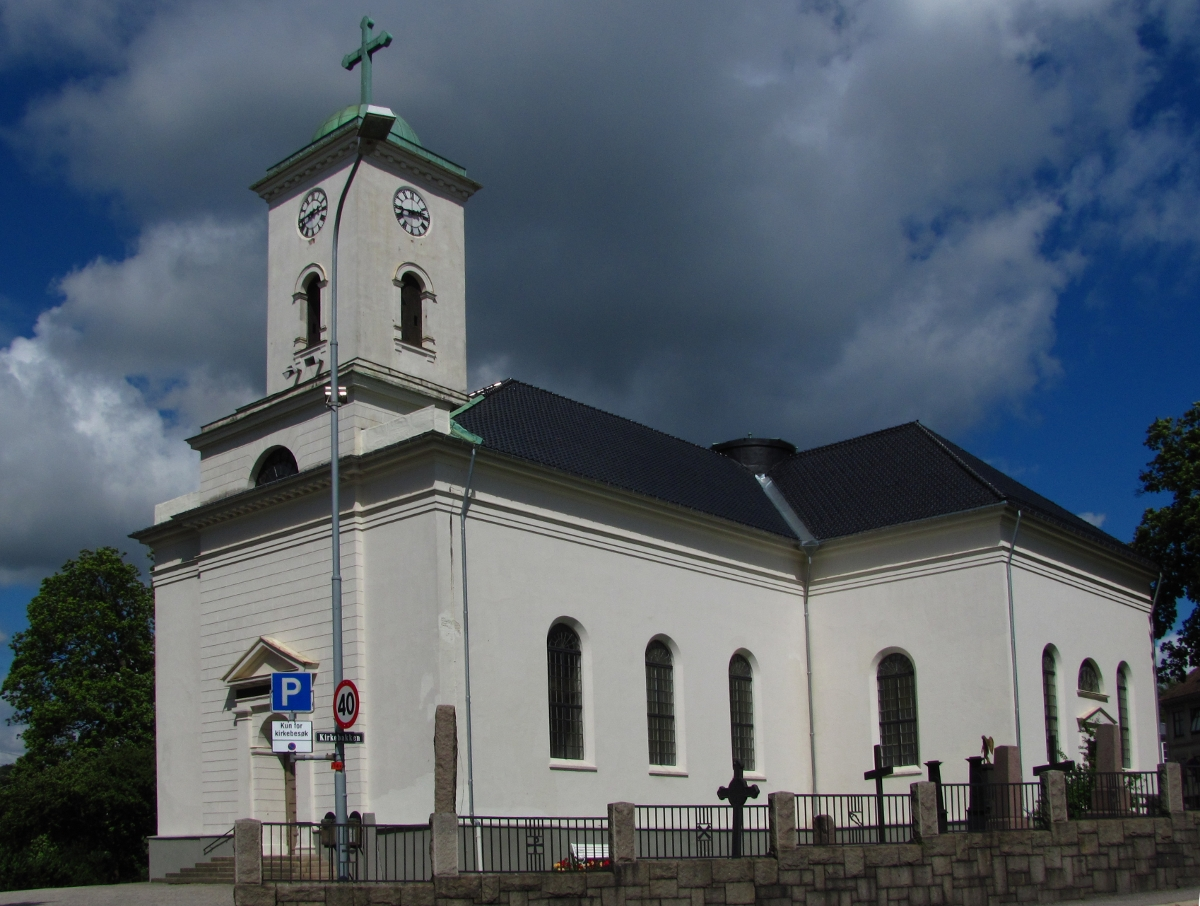

- Location in Østfold Immanuel Church (Norway)
- Location: Halden
- Country: Norway
- Denomination: Church of Norway
- Churchmanship: Evangelical Lutheran

History
- Status: Parish church

Architecture
- Functional status: Active
- Architect: Christian Heinrich Grosch
- Completed: 1833

Specifications
- Capacity: 900
- Materials: Brick

Administration
- Diocese: Borg
- Deanery: Sarpsborg

Immanuel Church (Norwegian: Immanuels kirke) is a cruciform church dating from 1833 in the municipality of Halden in Østfold county, Norway. It stands in the center of Halden and belongs to the Deanery of Sarpsborg.

== History ==
The church is built on the site of an older church that burned in 1826. Construction of the church began in 1828 based on plans by the architect Christian Heinrich Grosch in partnership with Ole Peter Riis Høegh, and it was consecrated in 1833. It is built of brick and can accommodate 900 people. The church underwent restoration in 1950.

The church is built in the late Empire style. Nils Marstein of the Norwegian Directorate for Cultural Heritage has called Immanuel Church the single most important creation among the many churches that Grosch built, and he referred to the church as "a masterpiece of Empire style religious architecture in Norway."

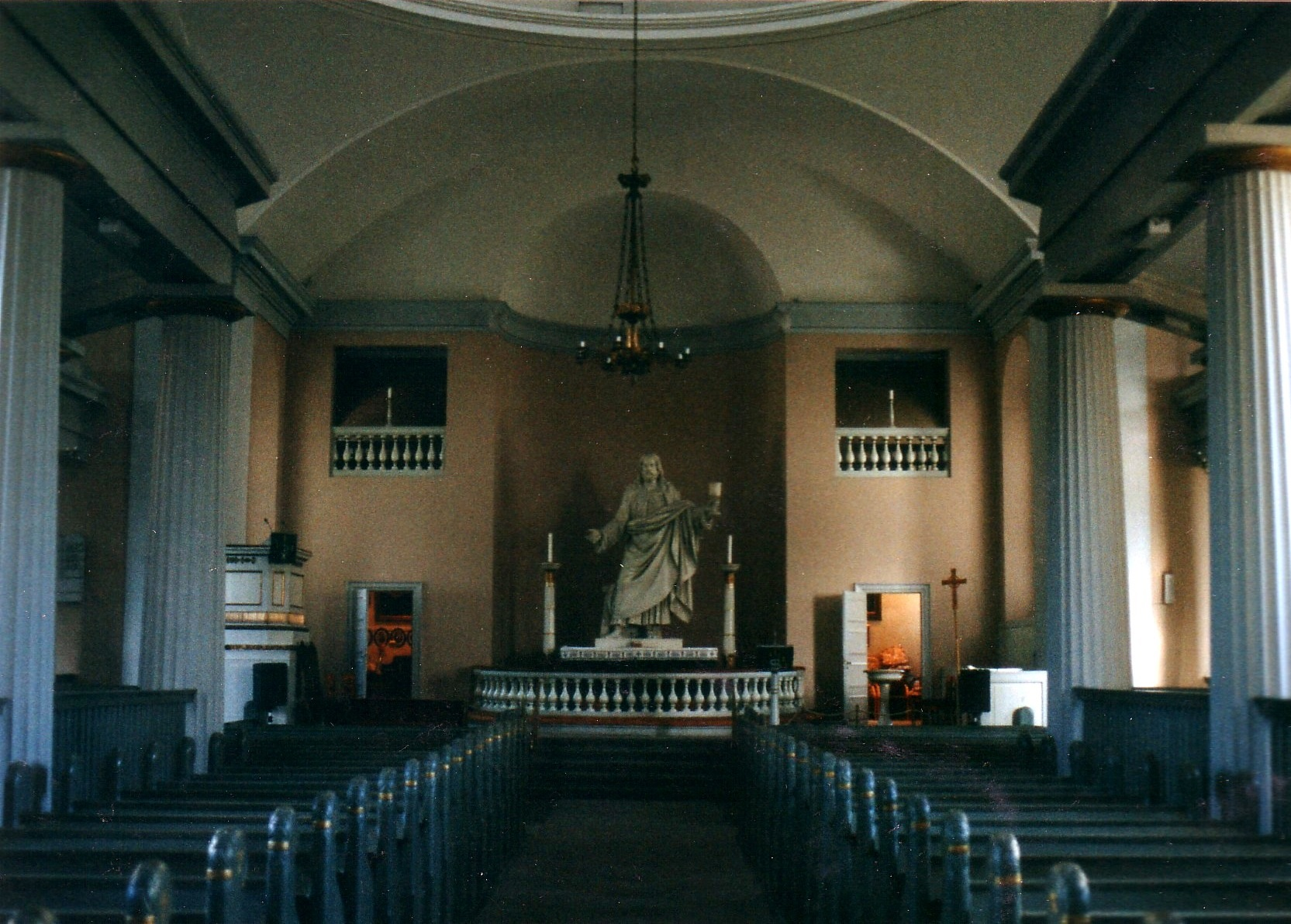
Interior of Immanuel Church

== Furnishings ==
The altar features a statue of Christ from 1833, created by Johan Niclas Byström. The pulpit is made of wood and was designed by Grosch. The baptismal font was also designed by Grosch and it is made of cast iron.

There are five chandeliers in the church, all dating from 1837. The church contains some older pieces of silver work, including a wine cruet from 1707 and a chalice with a paten and lid from 1739.
