= Tronka, Trondheim =

Wooden building in Trondheim, Norway

Coordinates: 63°25′46.405″N 10°22′52.590″E

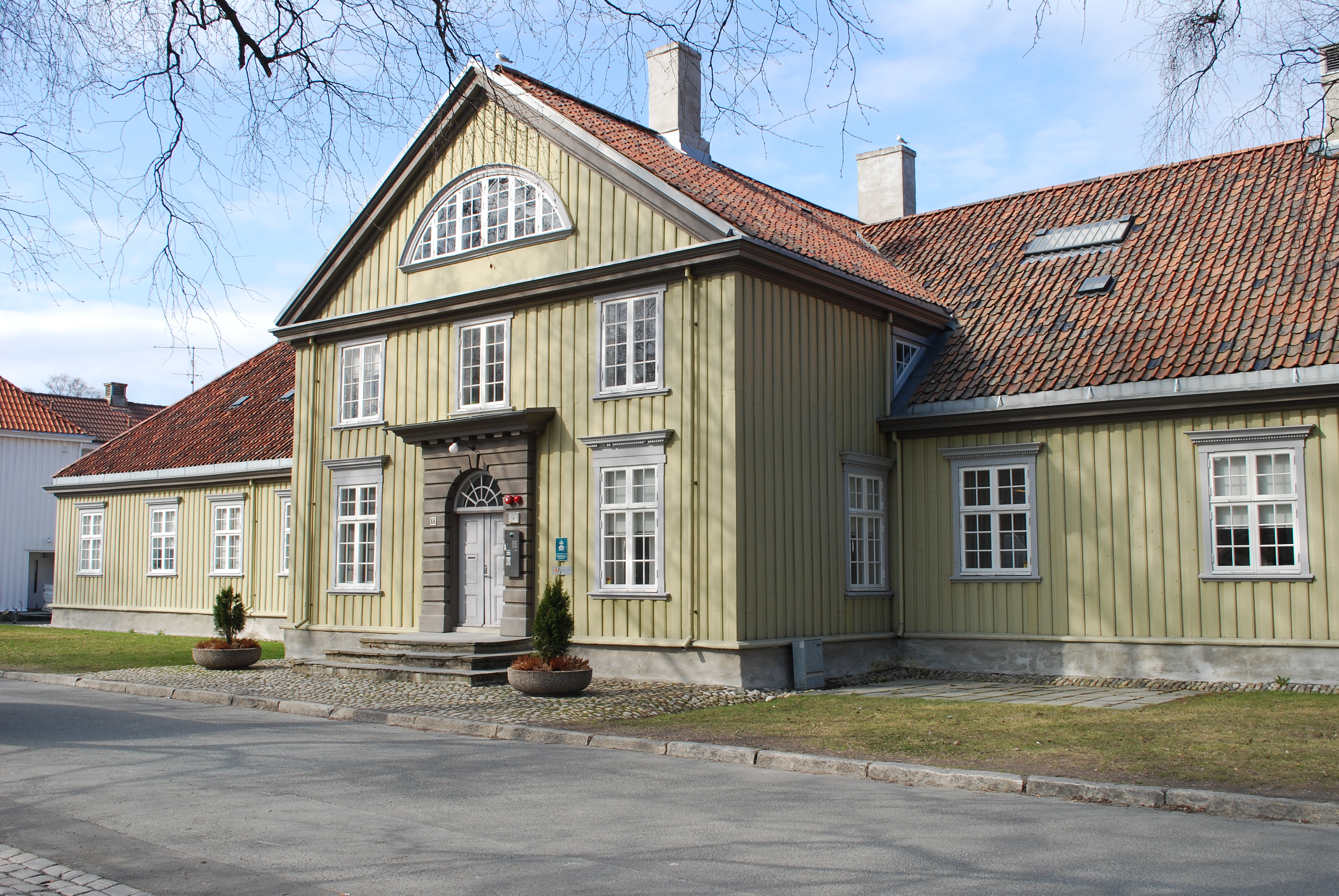
Tronka, Erling Skakke Street (Erling Skakkes gate) 66, in Trondheim's Kalvskinnet neighborhood

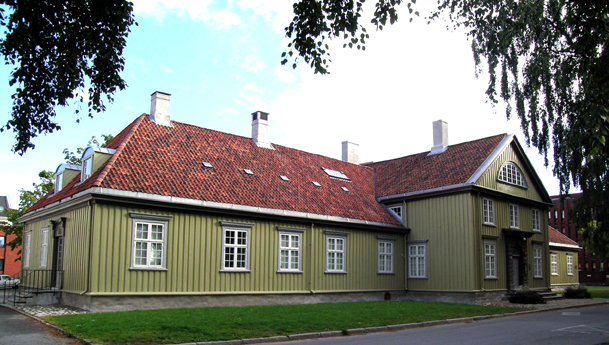
Tronka in 2006

Tronka is a detached, monumental wooden building built in the classical style in the Kalvskinnet neighborhood of Trondheim.

The structure was built between 1836 and 1842 as the Trondheim Hospital Care Foundation for the Feeble Minded (Norwegian: Trondhjems Hospitals Pleiestiftelse for Sindssvage) based on a design by Gustav Adolph Lammers and Ole Peter Riis Høegh. The name Tronka is probably derived from the French word tronc 'alms box', referring to an alms box at the entrance. The building functioned as an institution for the mentally ill until the Municipality of Trondheim took it over in 1919. The building was given protected status by the Norwegian Directorate for Cultural Heritage in 1927. The structure was taken over by the Norwegian Directorate of Public Construction and Property in 1995 and, after an extensive restoration project, in 2005 the building was put into use as office space for the directorate's Central Norway region.
