= Bergen City Museum =

Museum foundation in Bergen, Norway

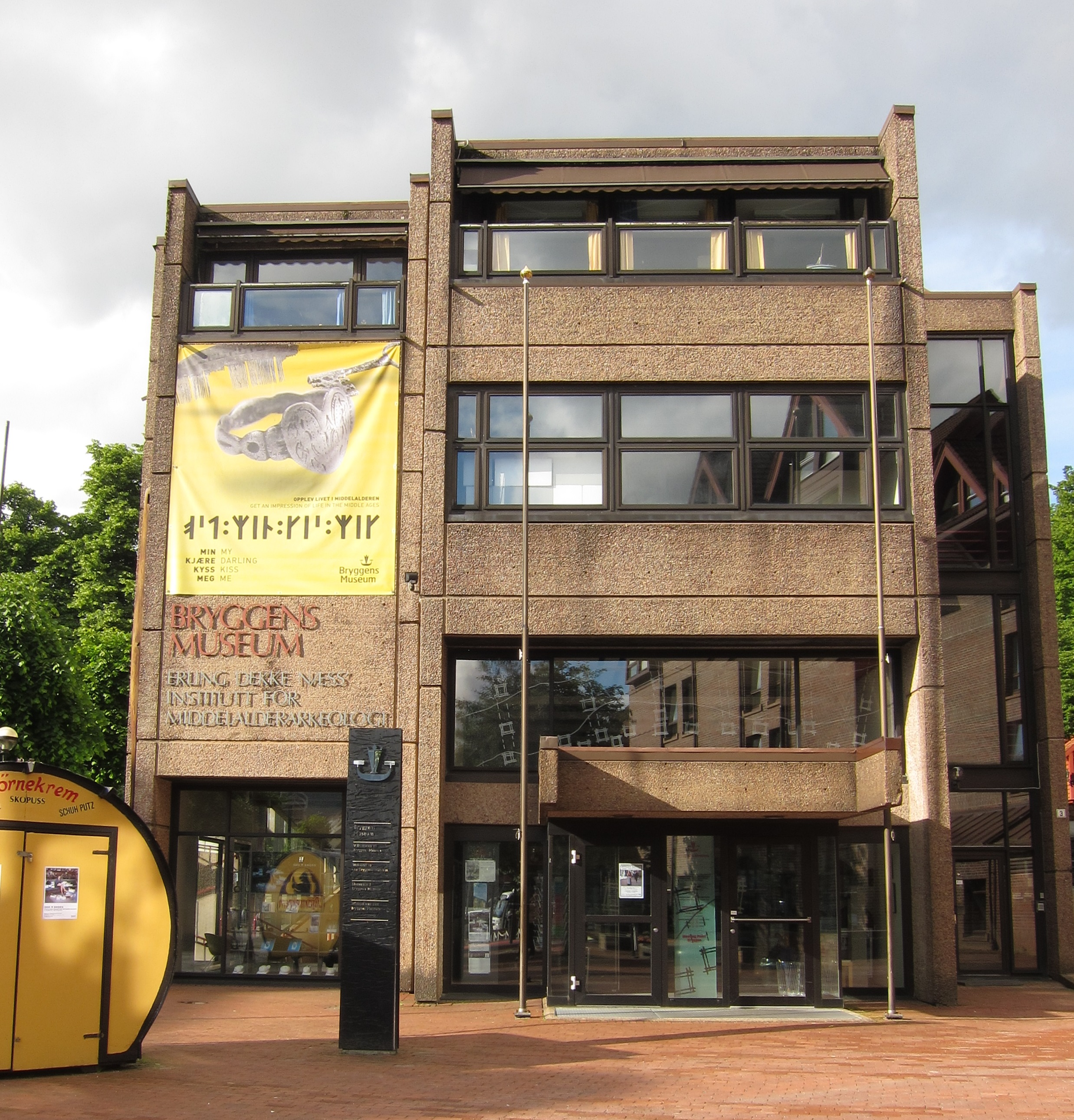
Bryggens Museum

Bergen City Museum (Norwegian: Bymuseet i Bergen) is a foundation which operates several museums in Bergen, Norway.

== History ==
The museum foundation was established on 1 July 2005 through merger of the former independent institutions. The establishment of Bergen City Museum took place as part of a national museum reform. Each museum has joint administration and manages historic building reflecting various aspects of the city's history. Collectively Bergen City Museum presently manages more than 100 buildings and a unique collection of art and artifacts.

== Subordinate museums ==
- Alvøen Manor (Alvøen hovedbygning)
- Bergen School Museum and Holberg Museum (Bergen Skolemuseum og Holbergmuseet)
- Bryggens Museum
- Damsgård Manor (Damsgård hovedgård)
- Håkon's Hall (Håkonshallen)
- Hordaland Open-air Museum (Hordamuseet)
- Leprosy Museum at St. Jørgen Hospital (Lepramuseet)
- Old Bergen Museum (Gamle Bergen museum)
- Rosenkrantz Tower (Rosenkrantztårnet)

== Gallery ==
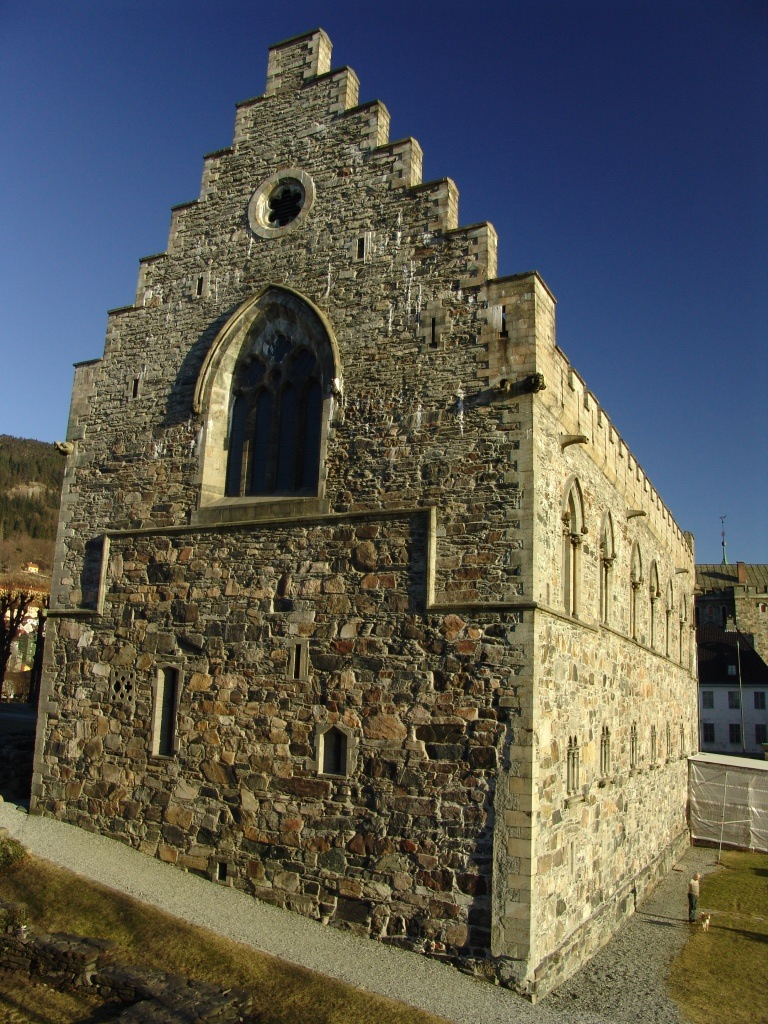
Haakonshallen

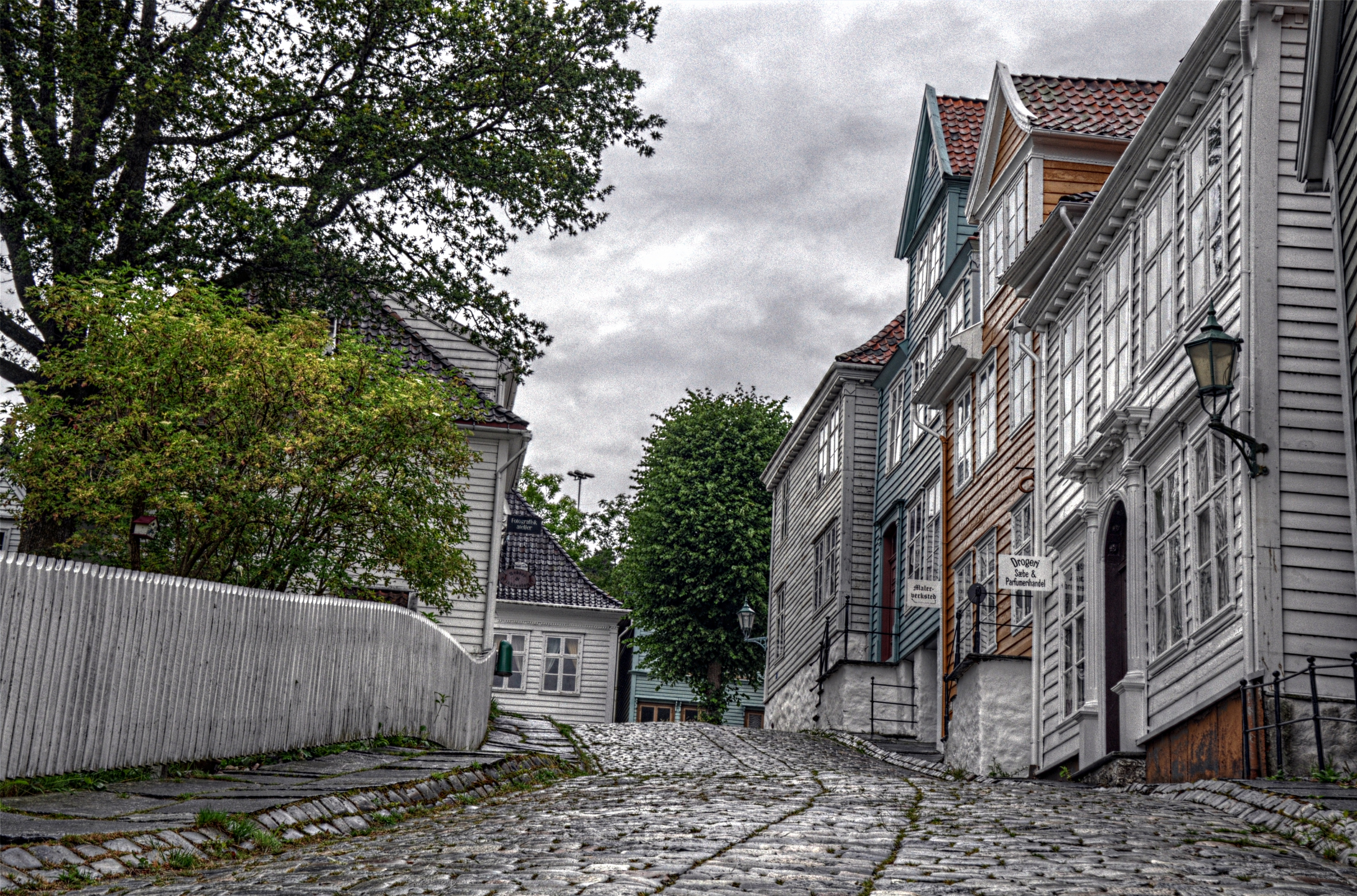
Gamle Bergen Museum

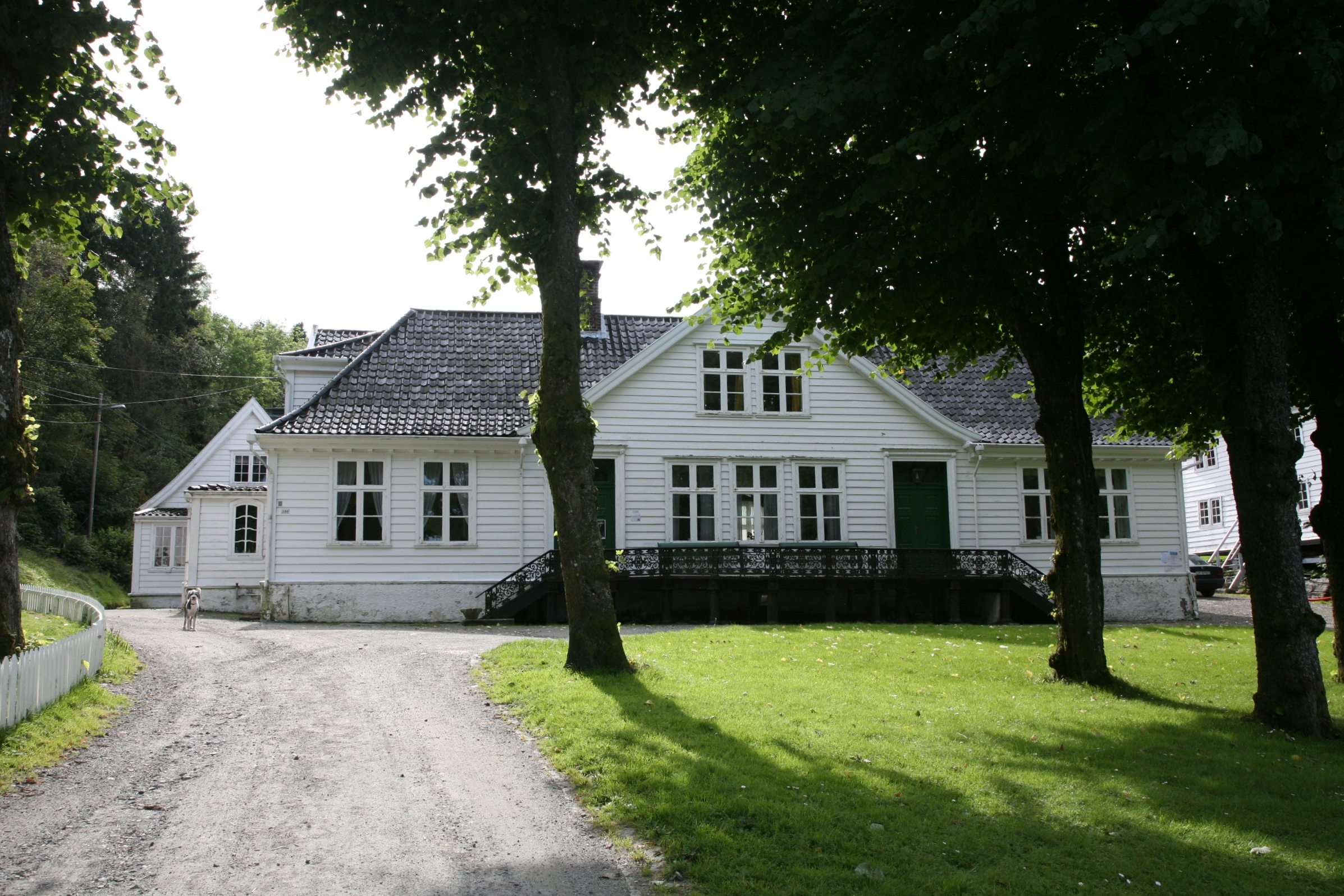
Alvøen Manor

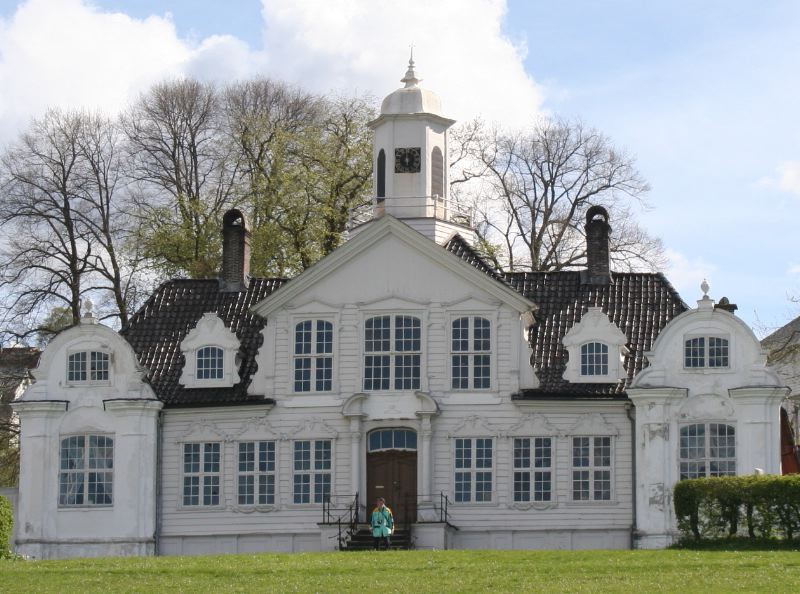
Damsgård Manor

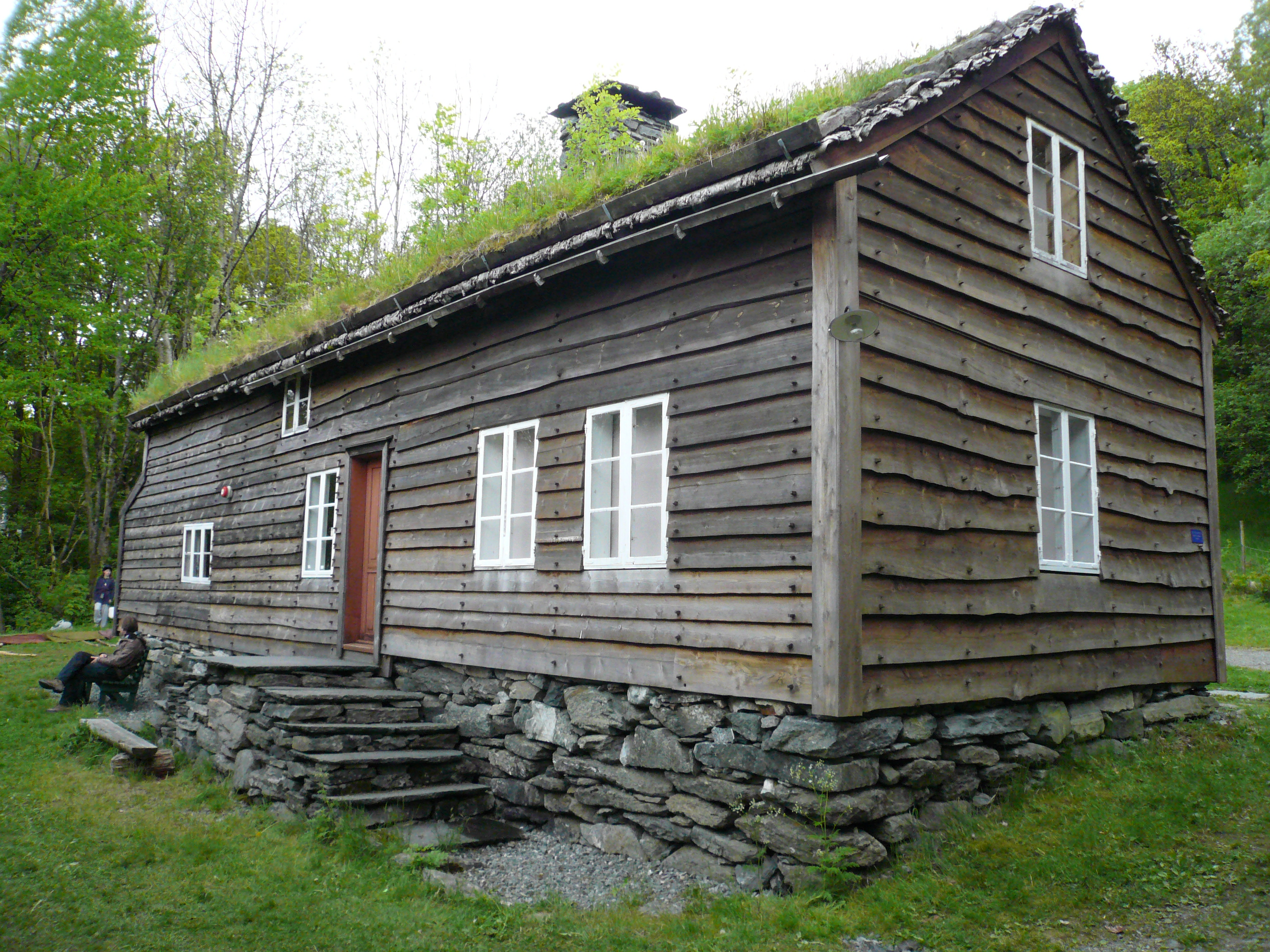
Hordamuseet

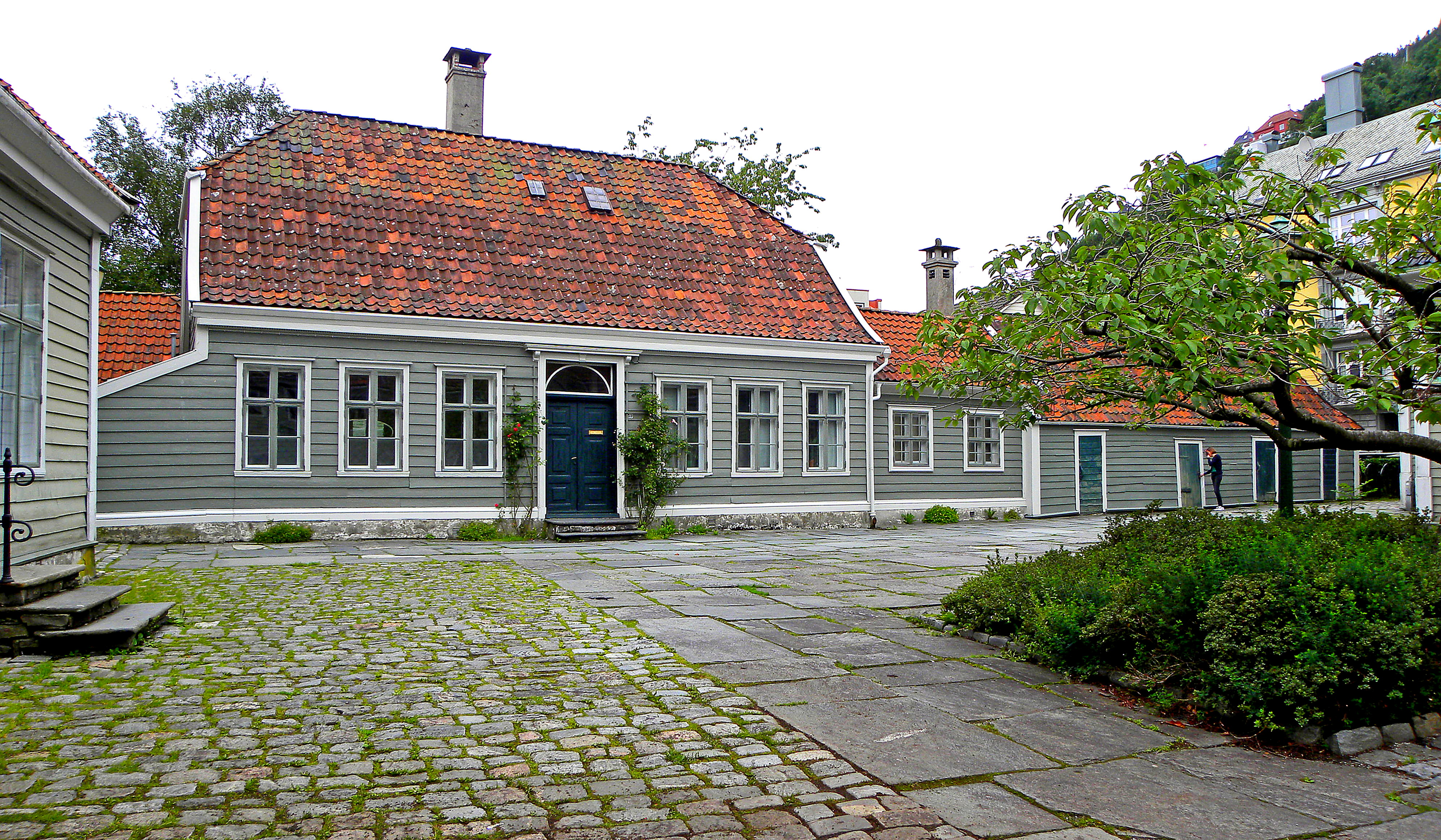
Leprosy Museum

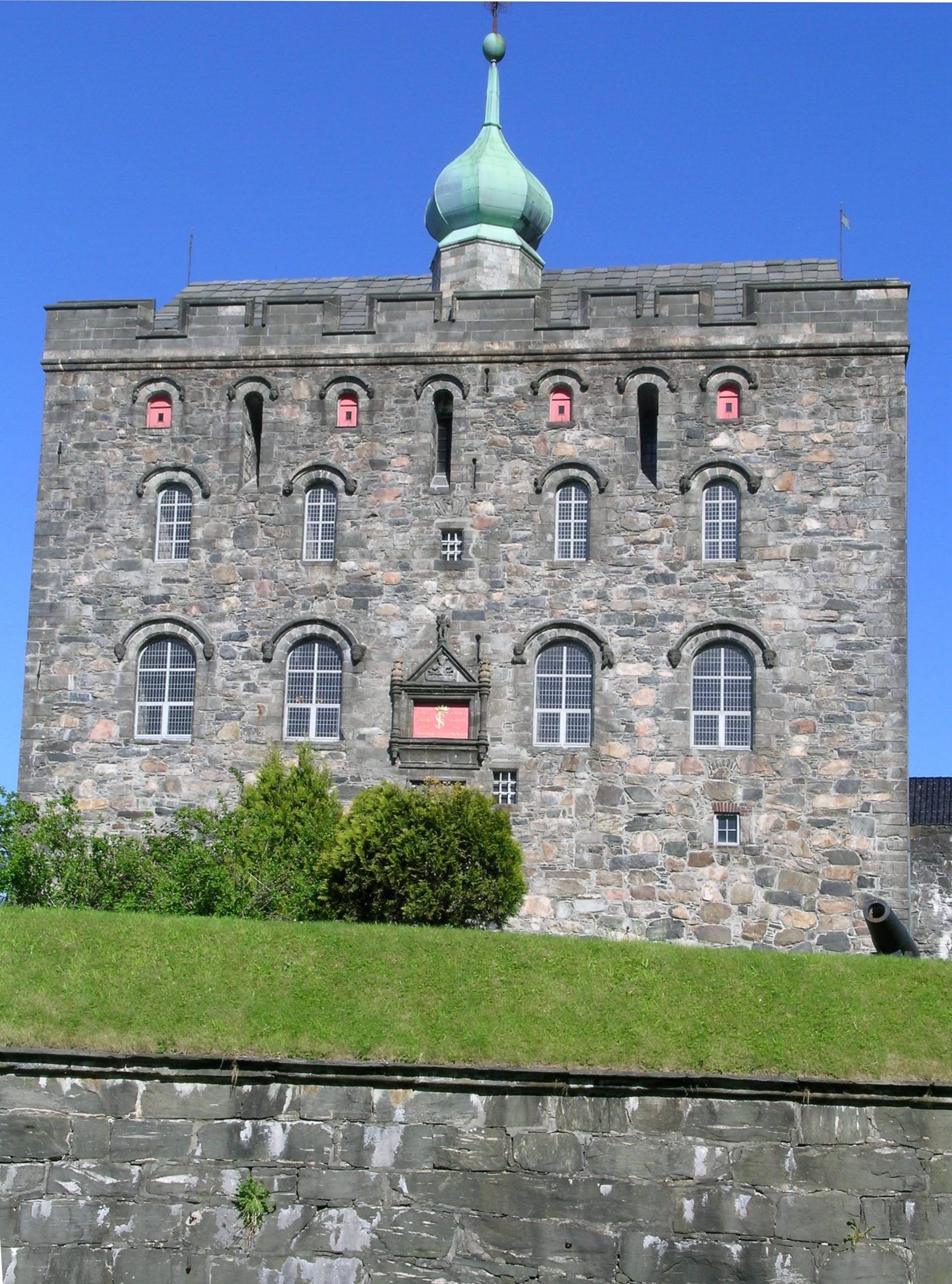
Rosenkrantz Tower
