= Trondheim Science Museum =

Science museum in Trondheim, Norway

Coordinates: 63°25′49″N 10°24′1″E

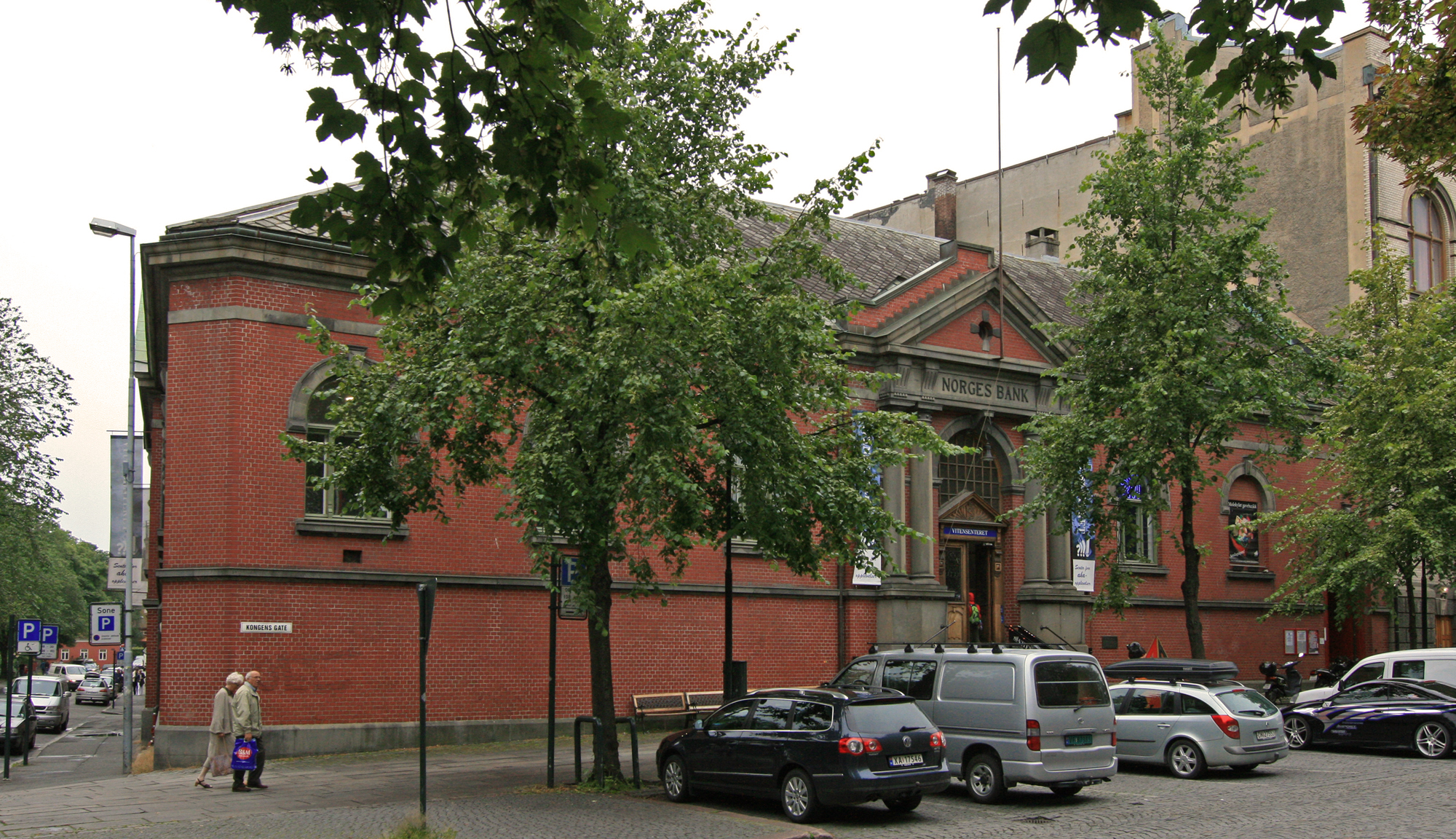
Trondheim Science Centre, former premises of Bank of Norway

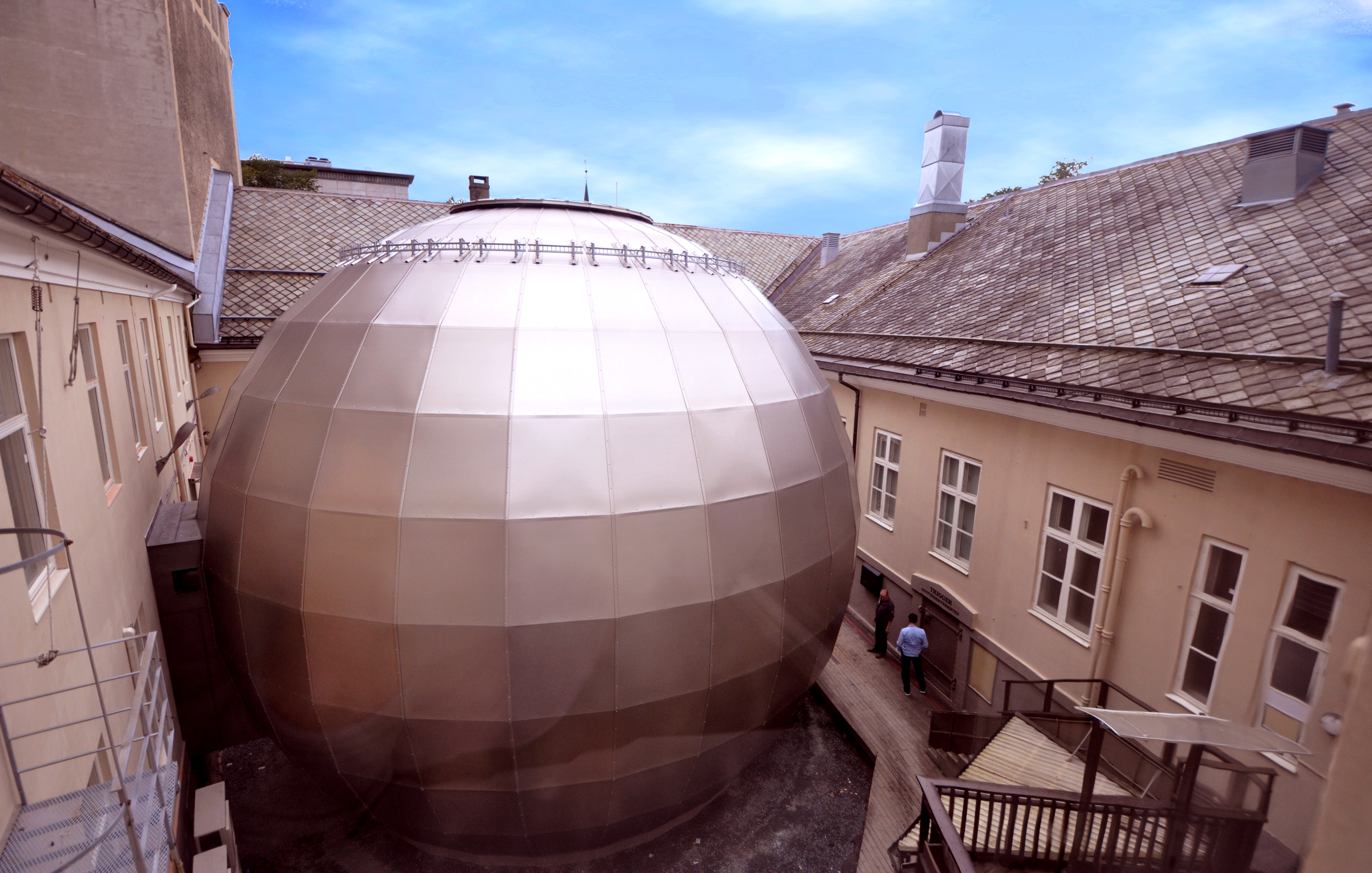
Science Center Planetarium

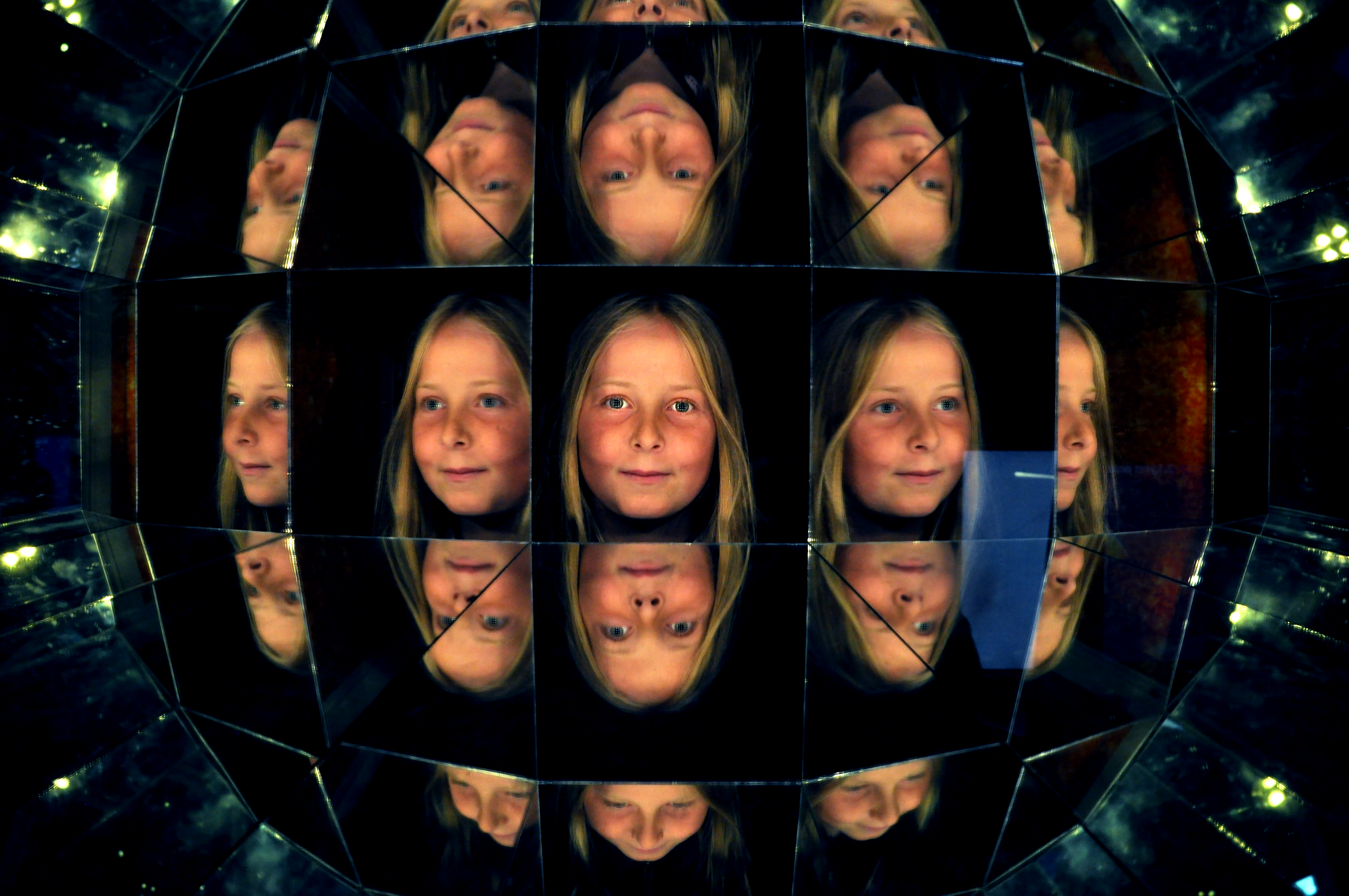
Science Center Mirror Model

Trondheim Science Centre (No: Vitensenteret i Trondheim) is located in the Kongens gate area of Trondheim, Norway.

== History ==
Trondheim Science Centre is a scientific hands-on experience center which disseminates popular science to the general public. The science center offers many activities in addition to the exhibitions. Visitors can conduct experiments on the displayed models, visit Norway's only 3D-planetarium, take part in kitchen chemistry experiments, enjoy science shows, late nights, festivals and activities. The science center provides youth clubs, science camps and a fully equipped maker space. Trondheim Science Centre is one of 10 regional science centres in Norway.

Trondheim Science Centre is located in the former premises of the Bank of Norway in Trondheim which was designed in 1830–1831 by architect Ole Peter Riis Høegh (1806–1852) after preparatory work by the architect J. C. Ræder. The building was completed in 1833. The current appearance was the result of renovation and modernization in 1897 by architects Johan Martinus Christensen (1863–1935) and Lars Solberg (1858–1921).
