= Norwegian National Museum of Justice =

The Norwegian National Museum of Justice
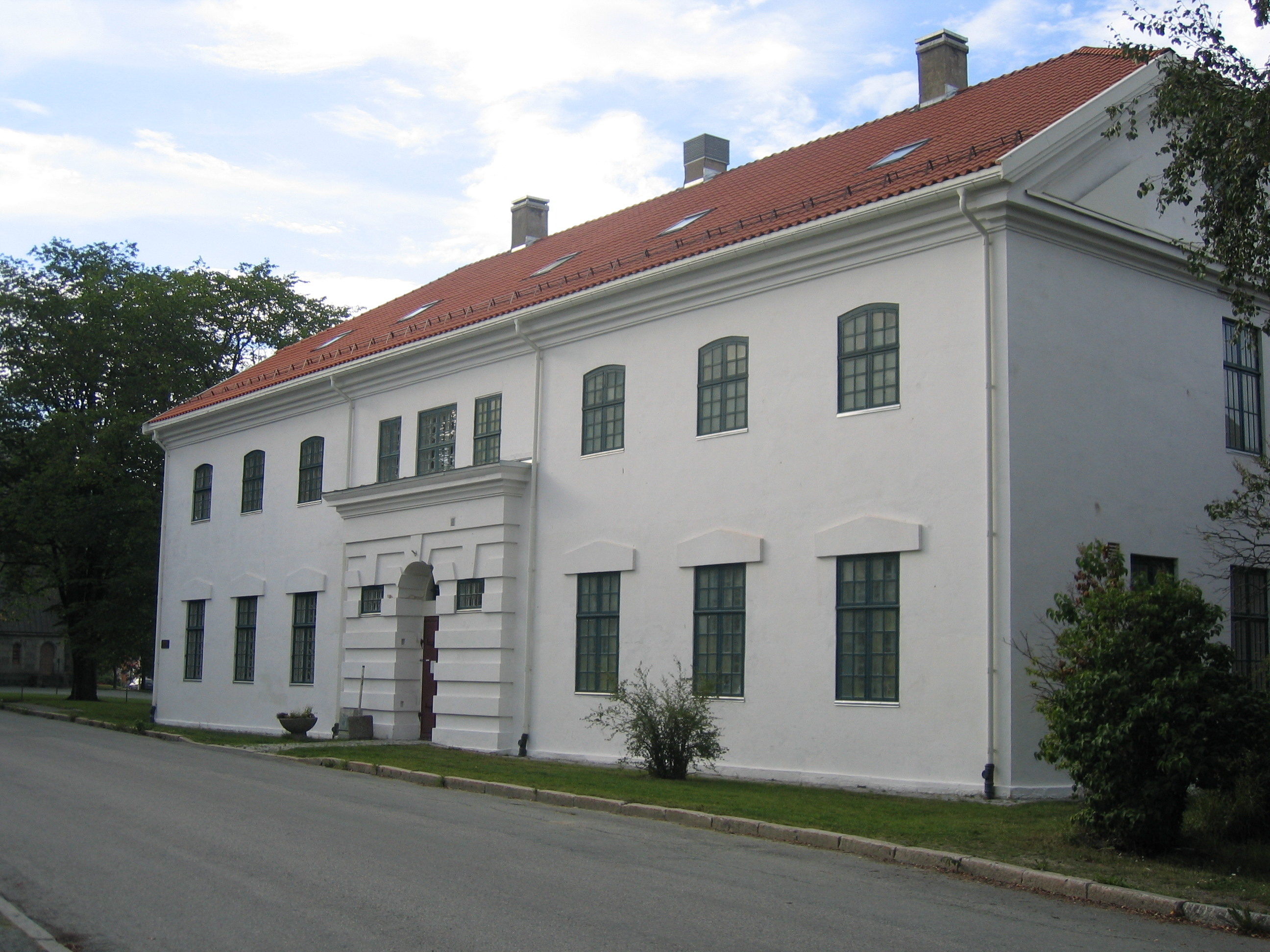
- Justismuseet i Trondheim
- Established: 2001
- Location: Kongens gate 95, Trondheim
- Coordinates: 63°25′49″N 10°22′41″E
- Type: public museum
- Director: Johan Sigfred Helberg
- Website: norsk-rettsmuseum.no

The Norwegian National Museum of Justice (Norwegian: Justismuseet, until 2016 Norsk Rettsmuseum) is a public museum of penal justice and law enforcement in Trondheim, Norway. It is housed in a former prison. From 2001-2017, the director of the museum was Johan Sigfred Helberg. From 2017-2018, the director was Brynja Birgisdottir and since 2019, has been Åshild Karevold.

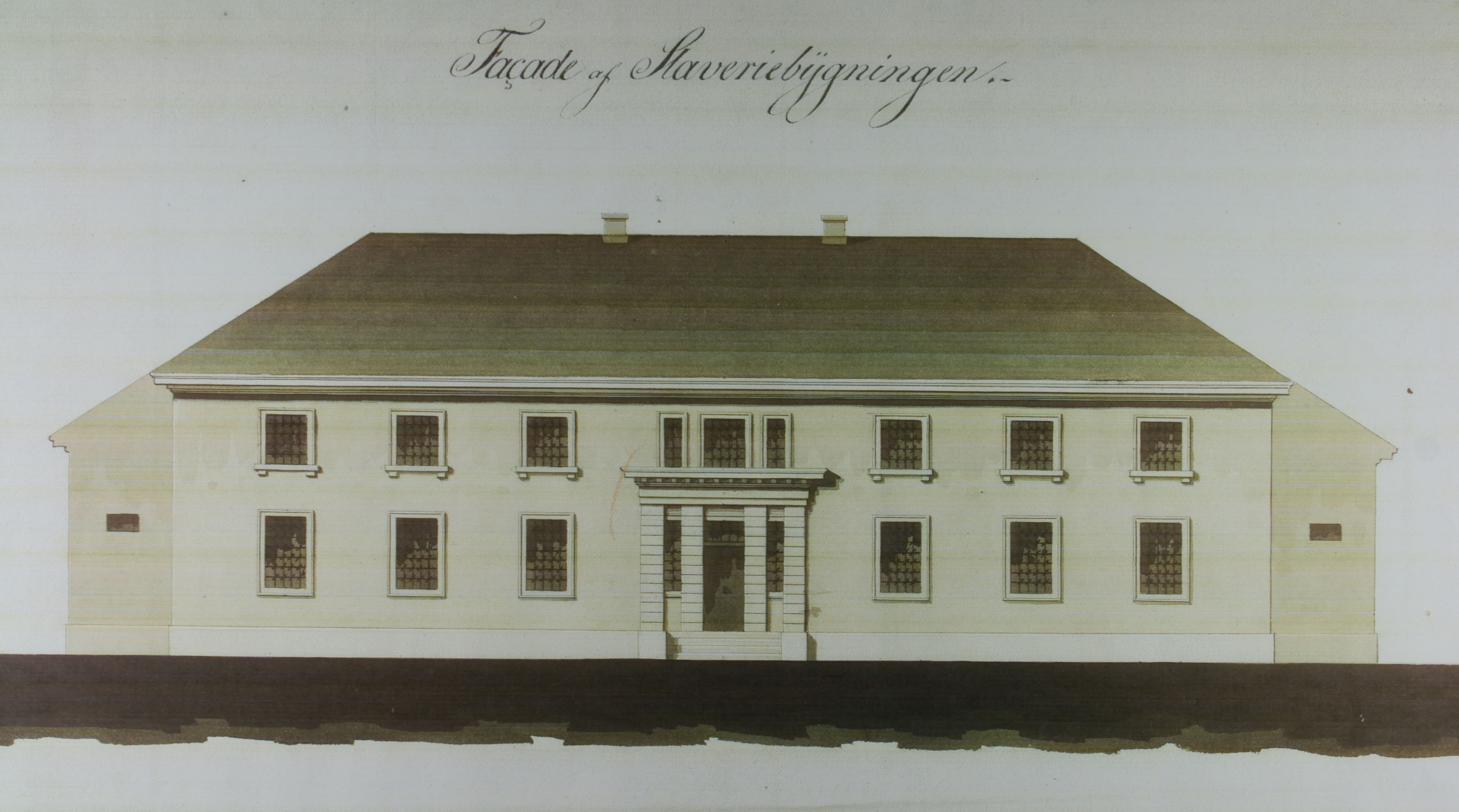
Drawing of the front of the slavery.
Arkitekt: no:Ole Peter Riis Høegh

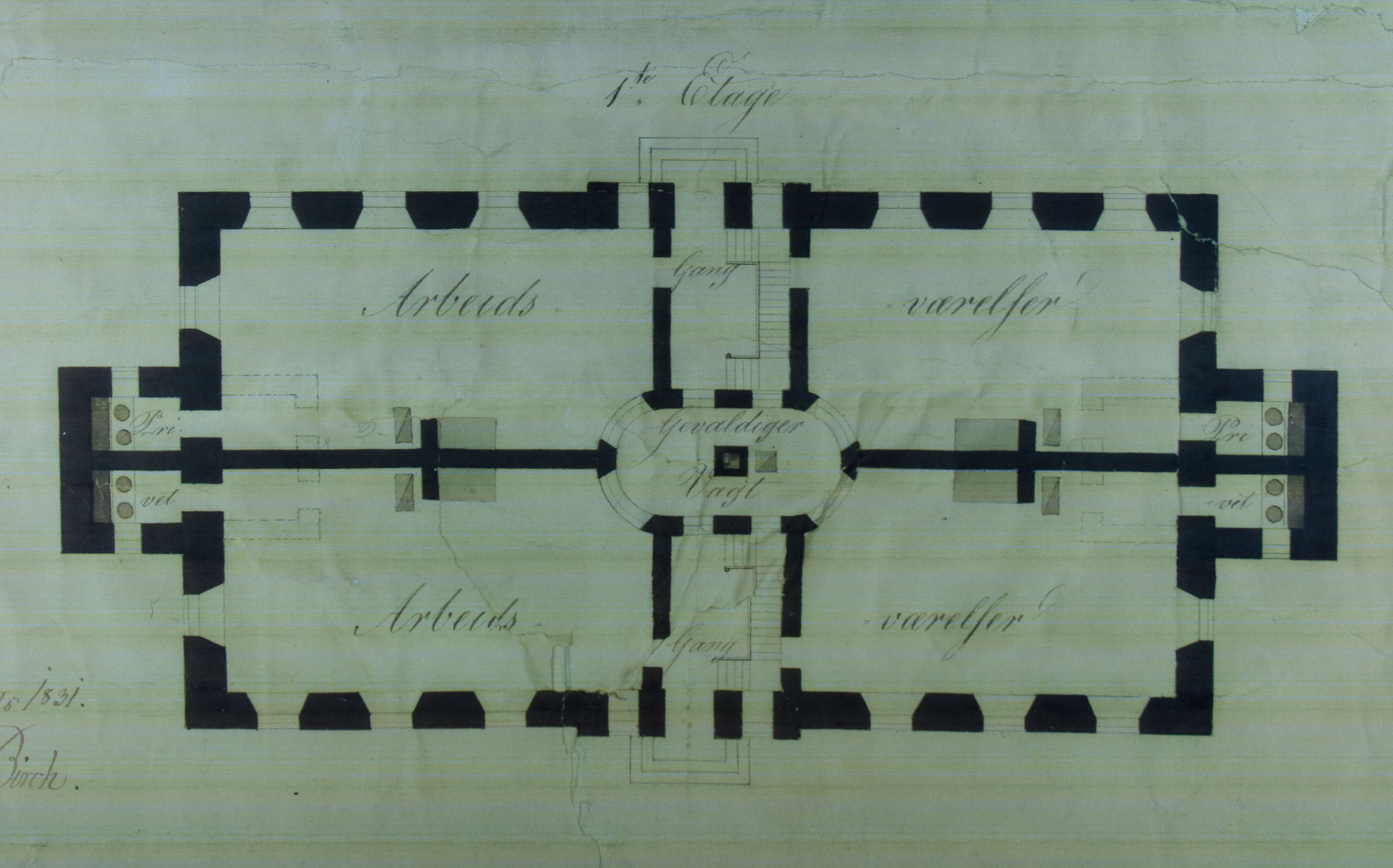
Drawing of the ground floor of the slavery

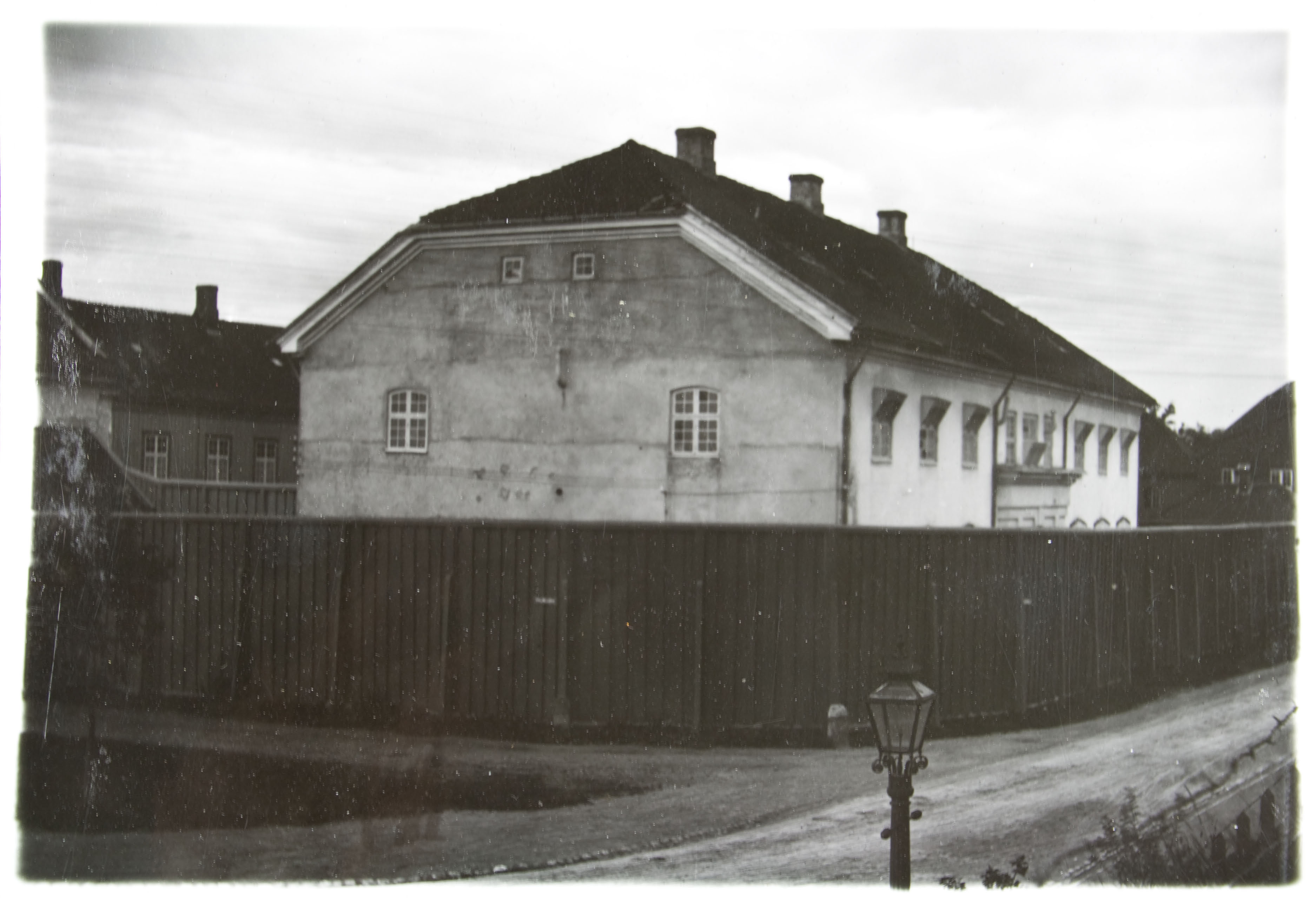
The slavery in the end of the 17th century

== Showcase and artifacts ==
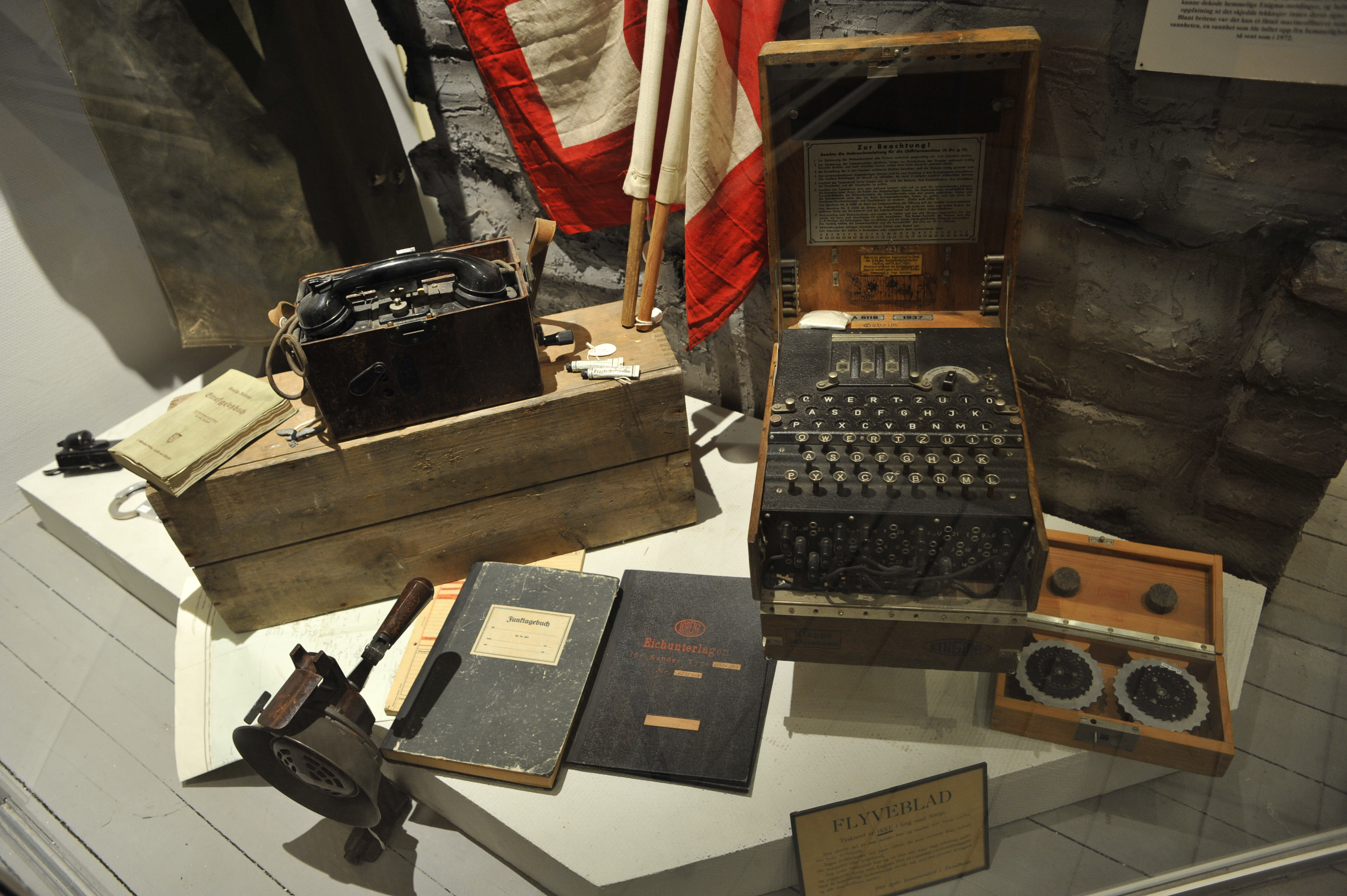
Enigma machine, German cipher machine

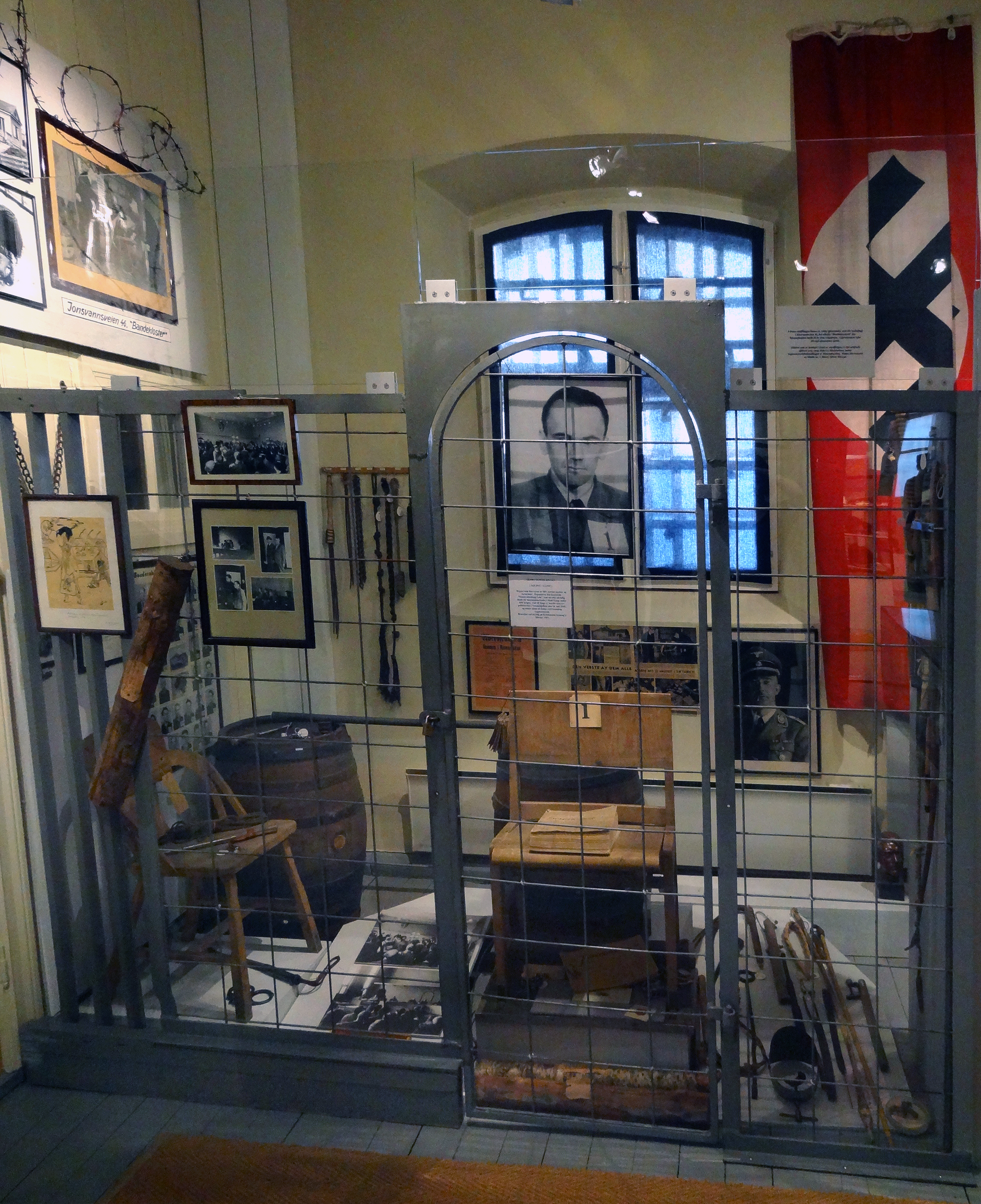
From the museum's exhibition of World War II.

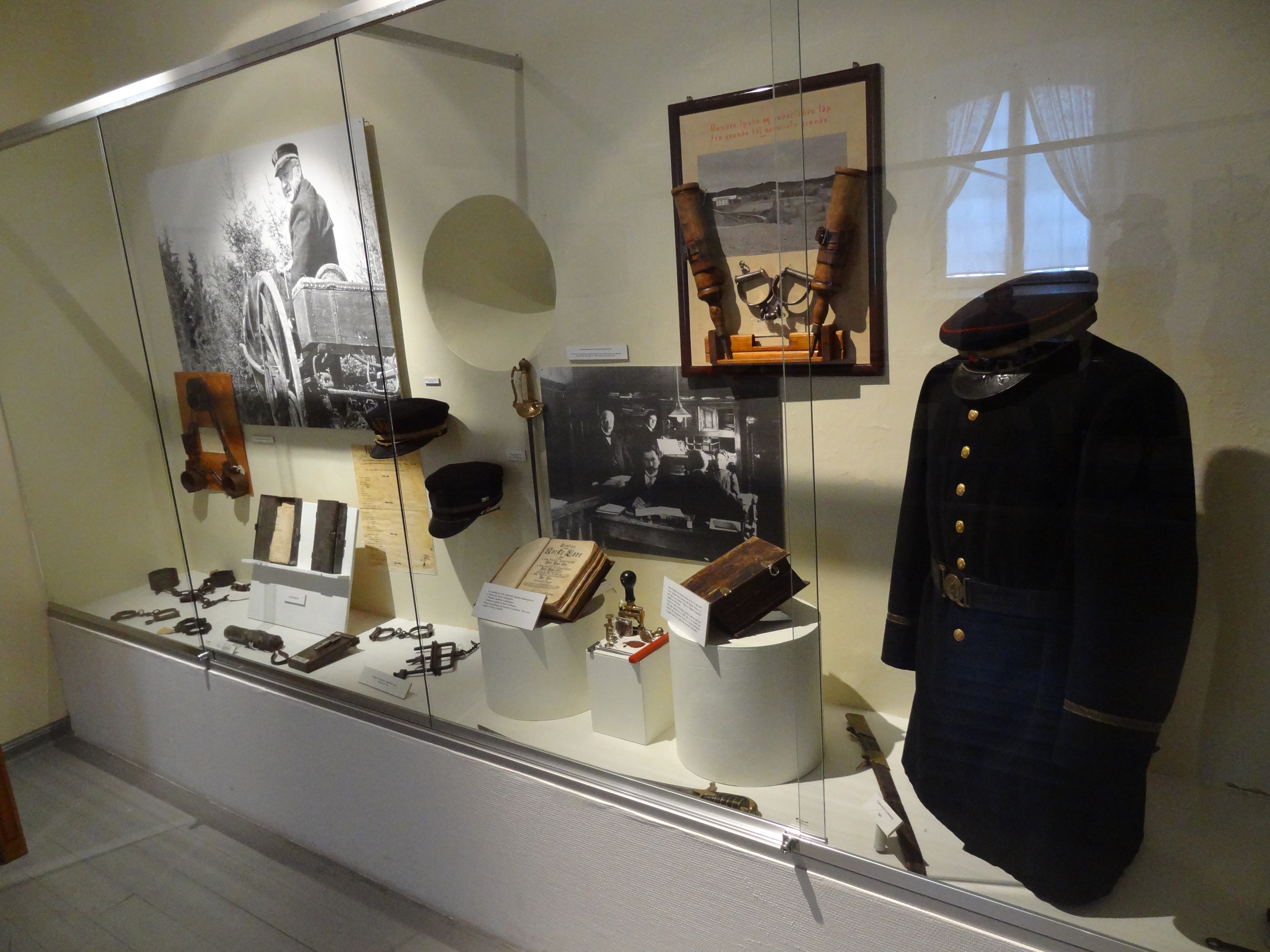

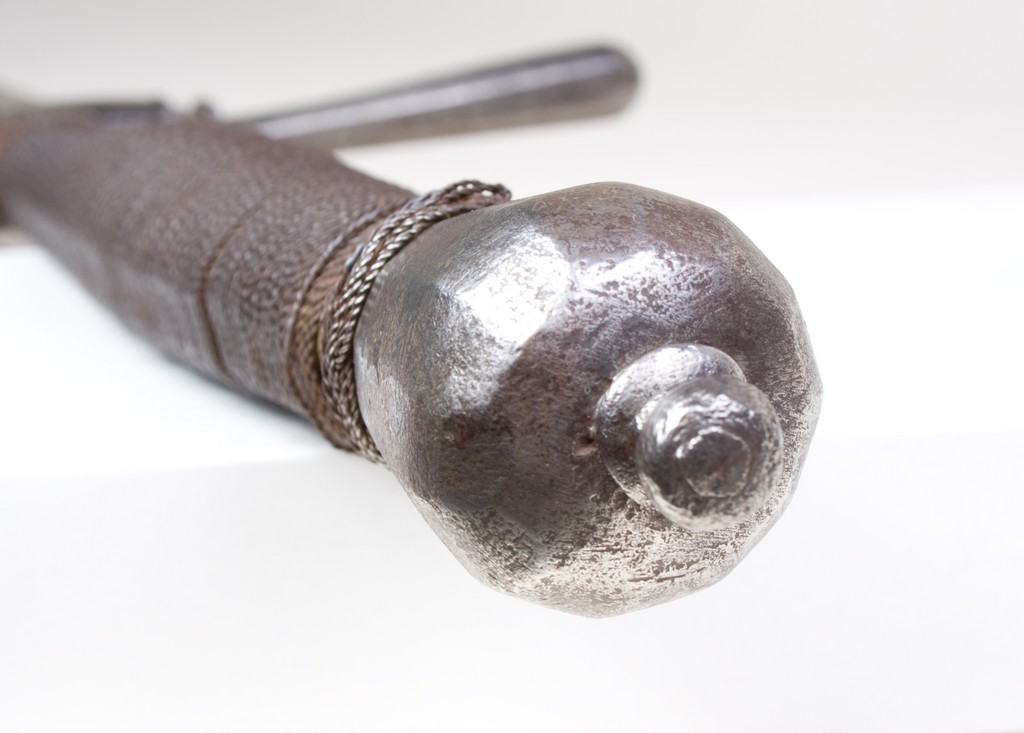
Executioner's sword from 1618.

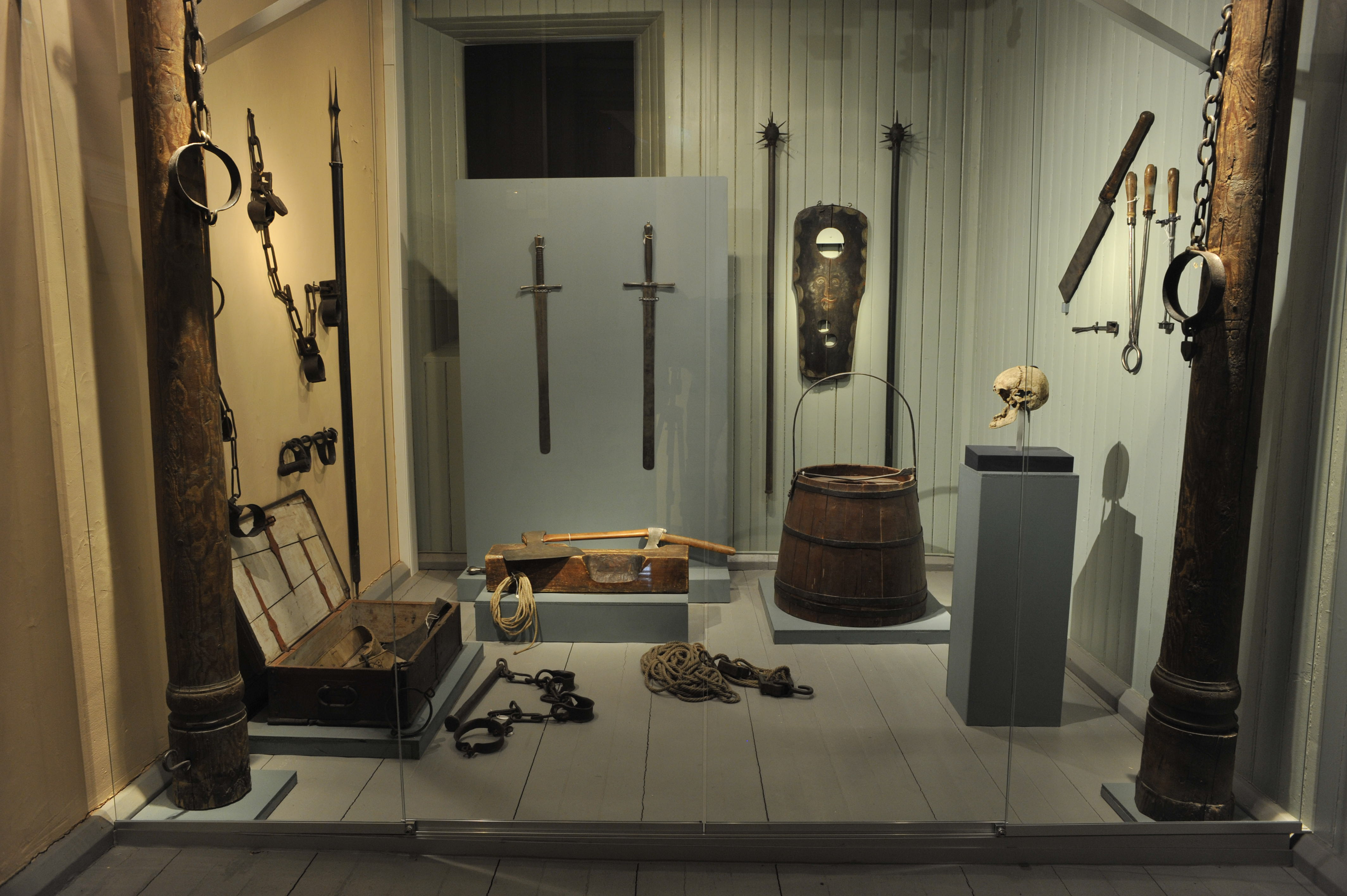
Executioners' room in the museum's second floor.

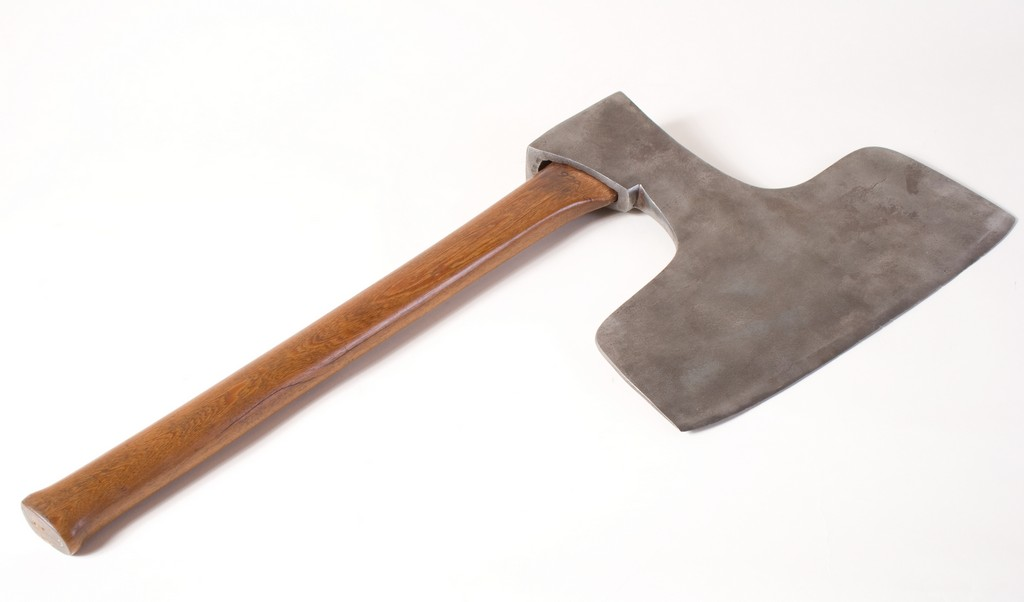
Executioner's axe from 1742. Axe made for Johann Caspar Öhlstein, the executioner in Trondheim for the period 1744–1768.

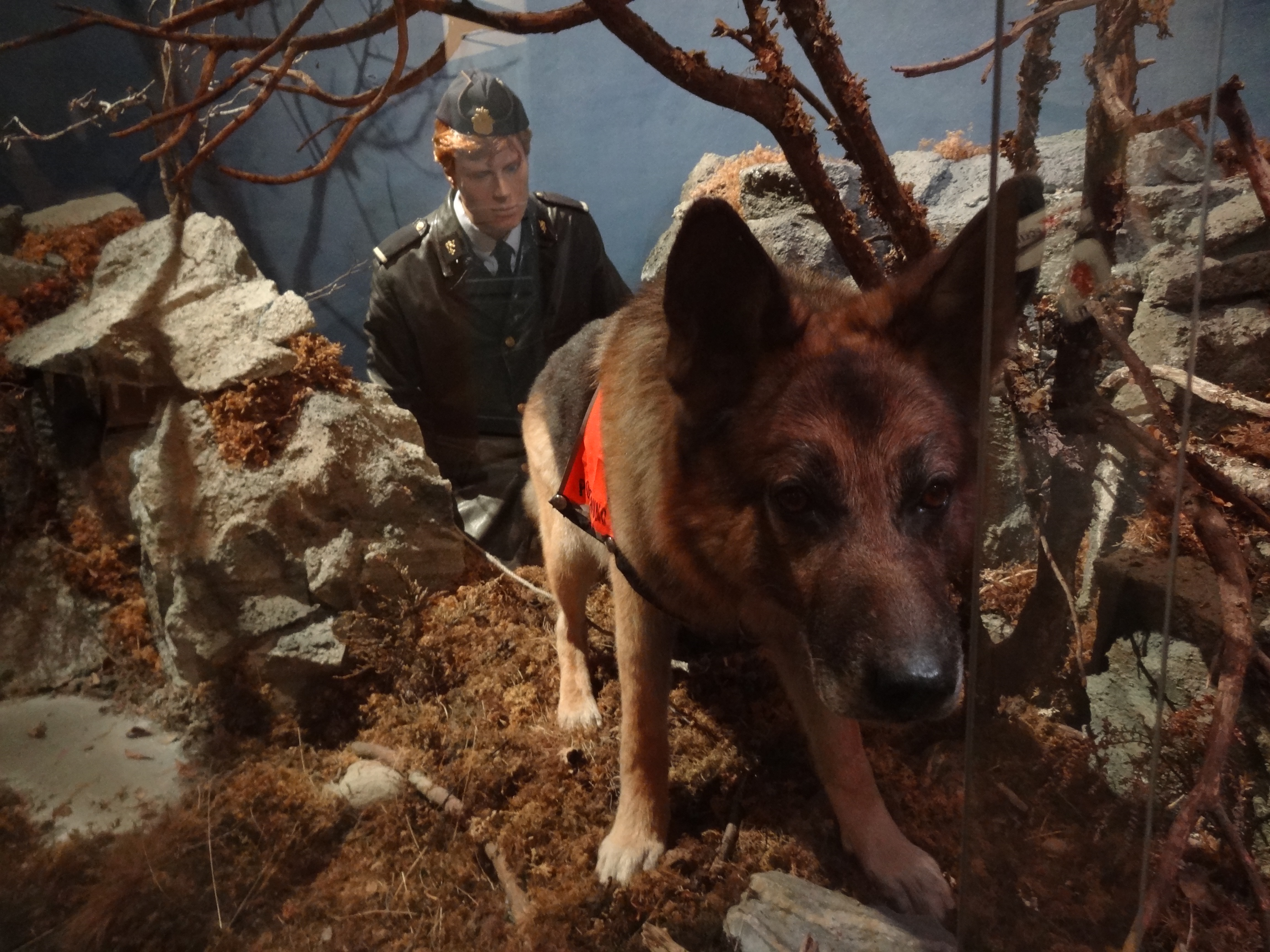
Utstilling i første etasje, Norsk rettsmuseum. Police-dog on duty.
