= Årstad =

Årstad (or historically spelled Aarstad) may refer to:

== People ==
- Stian Aarstad, a Norwegian pianist and keyboard player with the black metal band Dimmu Borgir
- Søren Tobias Årstad, a Norwegian jurist and politician for the Liberal Party

== Places ==
- Årstad, Bergen, borough of Bergen, Norway
- Årstad Municipality, a former municipality in the old Hordaland, Norway
- Årstad Church, a church in the city of Bergen, Norway
- Årstad, Falkenberg, locality in Falkenberg Municipality, Sweden
- Årstad Hundred, hundred of Halland in Sweden

== Other uses ==
- The Årstad Stone, a stone featuring runic inscriptions found in Årstad, Rogaland, Norway
- Årstad Idrettslag, a sports team/club in Bergen, Norway
