= Fogd =

Former type of Nordic civil servant

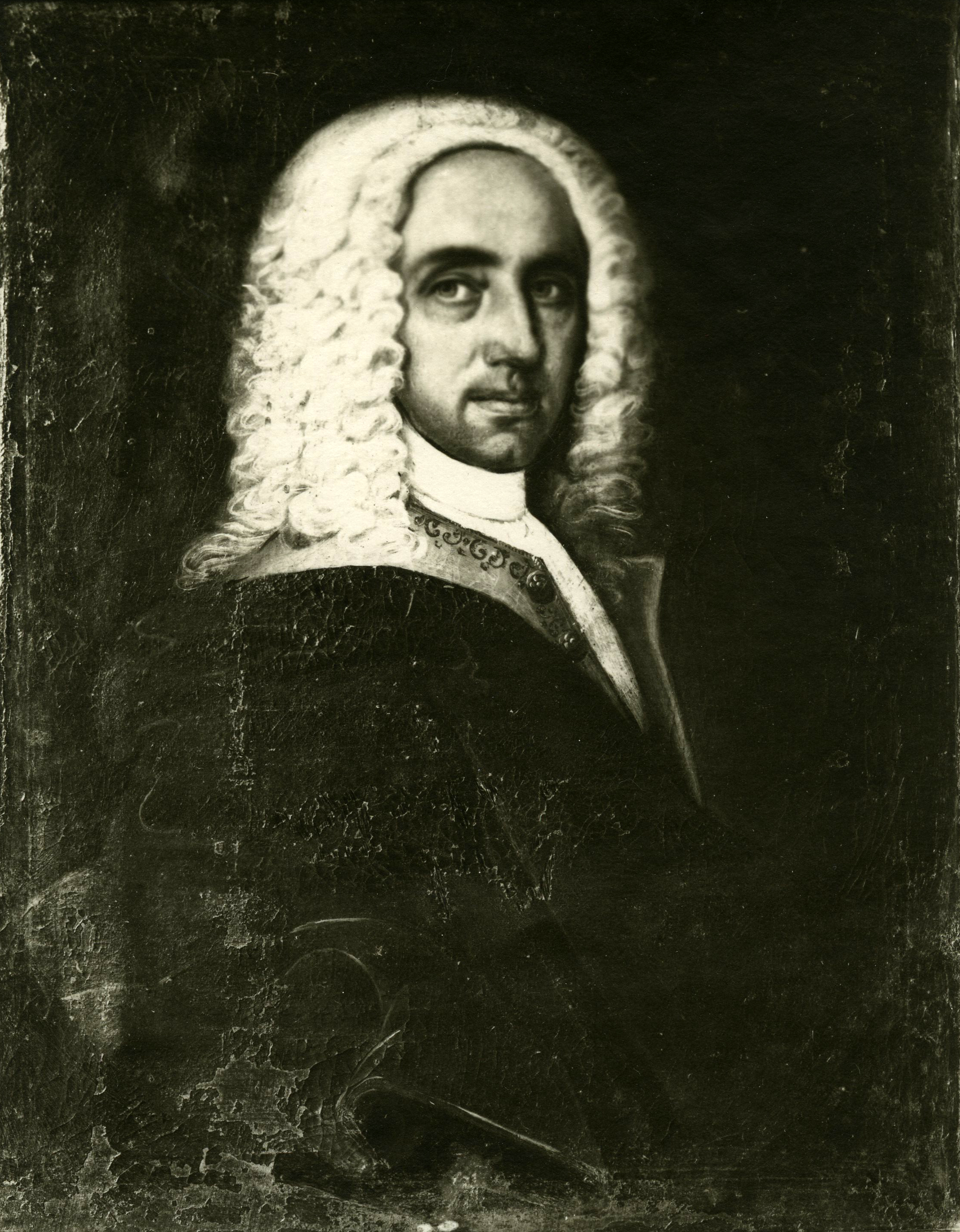
Kristoffer Nielsen Tønder (1587–1656), bailiff of Austråt, Norway, in 1621.

A fogd (Norwegian: fogd, or fut; Danish: foged; Swedish: fogde; Finnish: vouti) is a historical Scandinavian administrative function, and official title. They were bailiffs in charge of the administration and collection of taxes on behalf of the government, either in rural bailiwicks or in towns.

== Etymology and history ==
The word fogd came to Norwegian via Danish foged. The early Swedish term was foghate. These terms, and their continental relatives such as German Vogt and Dutch Voogd ultimately all derive from the term advocatus, or advocate. Within the medieval Holy Roman Empire, such advocates or Vogts were not legal representatives (as in modern English), but instead executed the functions of higher powers, such as lords and abbeys, in their name. The Latin term (ad)vocatus literally means "called upon".

The term appears sporadically in Norwegian sources from the 14th century in the forms fógt, fóguti, fólguti, or fógutr. Old Norse fóguti (and its other spellings) and Norwegian fut also go back to Latin. The title of bailiff replaced the title of bryte (Danish bryde) on farms in the Middle Ages, but reflects largely the same office: to be responsible for and manage some kind of property on behalf of its owner. This could be a farm, a piece of land, or a castle, in which case the title of bailiff is seen almost as a replacement for the title of jarl. In the husby estates, later called kongsgård (Swedish kungsgård), the bailiff ruled. Hence one of the older words for bailiff: husabyman. Another synonym is prefectus.

== Responsibilities ==
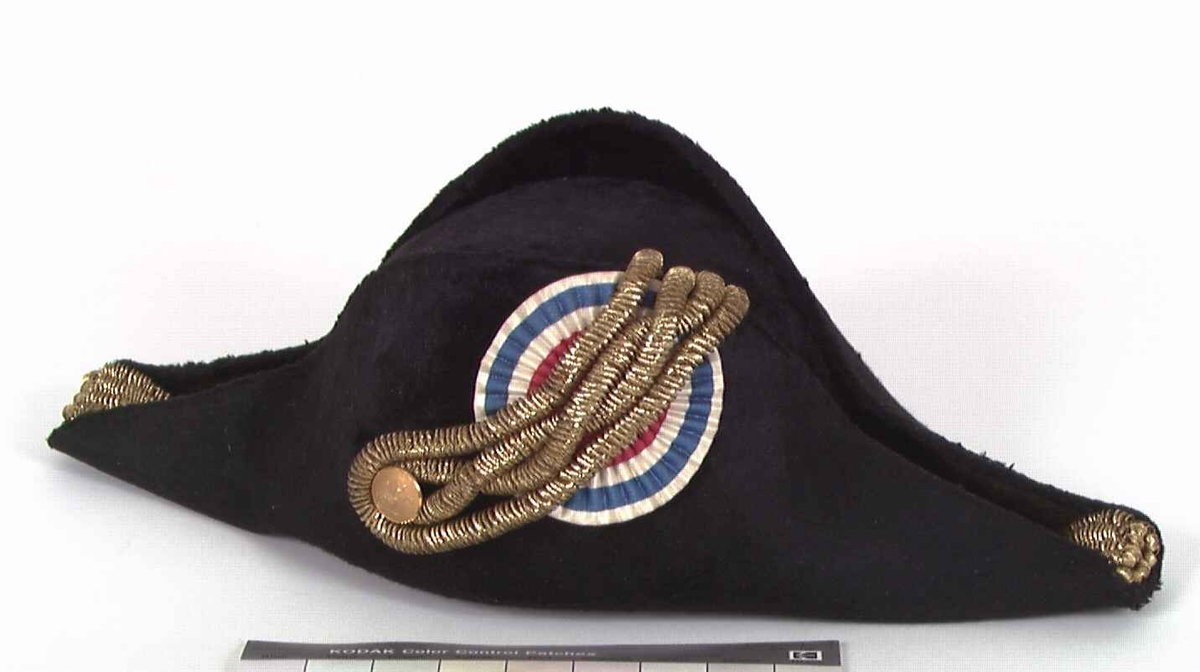
A hat that has belonged to bailiff of Stjørdal and Verdal Ole Chr. Bergh Lunde. Norwegian Museum of Folklore.

The bailiff had police and prosecution powers and collected taxes and fines in a district. For a time, the bailiff was also responsible for keeping track of foreigners. The bailiff issued and controlled passports.

In Sweden, with Magnus IV's 1350 city law (Swedish: stadslagen), the king's bailiff was included as a member of the magistrate, the 'elders' of a city, who supervised municipal activities, police and justice, and acted as a court of law.

The feudal lords (Norwegian: lensherrene) in Norway had bailiffs under them who collected taxes and fines and were responsible for maintaining order. Initially they were the personal servants of the lord, but by the early 17th century they had been transferred to the service of the king. The bailiff had great power in the village council (bygdeting). At the parliament in Oslo, lay judges from a village in Eastern Norway complained about a bailiff who had come with a Swedish woman and threatened them: "Here is a woman I should have judgment on today." But the procedural rule in Norwegian law required two concurring witnesses to find someone guilty, and the bailiffs had not seen the woman before and had no opportunity to summon any witnesses and deal with the case according to the law.

In 1497, Knut Alvsson's bailiff Lasse Skjold was killed at the Thing in Romerike, Norway, when he came to collect taxes. His brutal behavior was the cause, and around 180 farmers from Ullensaker and Nes supported the murder. The farmers were fined, but were found to have acted more or less in self-defense, and Alvsson was subsequently deposed as lord and stripped of his fiefdoms.

Between 1518 and 1521, large additional taxes were levied, and the peasants protested in parliament. They were supported by the bishop, who complained that the lord Hans Mule of Akershus Fortress was allowing his bailiff to plunder pilgrims. The lord of Bergenhus appeared armed at the Thing and levied an extra tax equivalent to 10% wealth tax. If there was no available money, he seized tapestries and boats. In the summer of 1521, the bailiff was killed at the court in Nordhordland. Christian II cracked down hard on the peasants, and several of the rebel leaders were executed. In 1526, farmers in Rogaland killed the lord's men and refused to pay taxes.

In 1540, farmers from Raabyggelaget gathered "to kill all bailiffs and lensmenn". With a huge club with sharp spikes, they made their way from Setesdal to Nedenes and killed the bailiff Nils Skredder there. Then they went towards Kvinesdal, but the lord Stig Bagge was not home. His men later captured the farmers and executed four of them. The leader described the "Hun army", a popular tradition about Attila's Huns 1,500 years earlier. The story of the Hun army came to life again during the Hatter's Feud at Hønefoss in 1851.

== Recent times ==
In Norway, the bailiff's dealings with the municipalities and participation in the county council were abolished by an 1894 act on the reorganization of the civil service. The posts of bailiff were abolished in 1894. Instead, the posts of county treasurer and chief of police were created. Between 1888 and 1919, the office of bailiff was completely abolished. Some tasks were transferred to the magistrate (sorenskriver) and sheriff. According to the National Chairmanship Act, the county governor (amtmann), bailiff, magistrate and lensmann were excluded from election to the mayor in their own municipality. The county governor and bailiff could not be elected as representatives to the Storting, and chairmen were also excluded from this election.

The last city bailiff's office in Norway, Oslo city bailiff's office (Oslo byfogdembete), was headed by a magistrate called a city bailiff (byfogd) until 2006. Oslo byfogdembete was then headed by a sorenskriver until the merger with Oslo District Court on 26 April 2021.

From 2008, the tax bailiffs (skattefogdene) were merged with the tax offices. The Act relating to Children and Parents designates a state agency called the grant bailiff (bidragsfogden). This function is the responsibility of the Labour and Welfare Service.

== The bailiff in popular memory: "Futen, the devil" ==
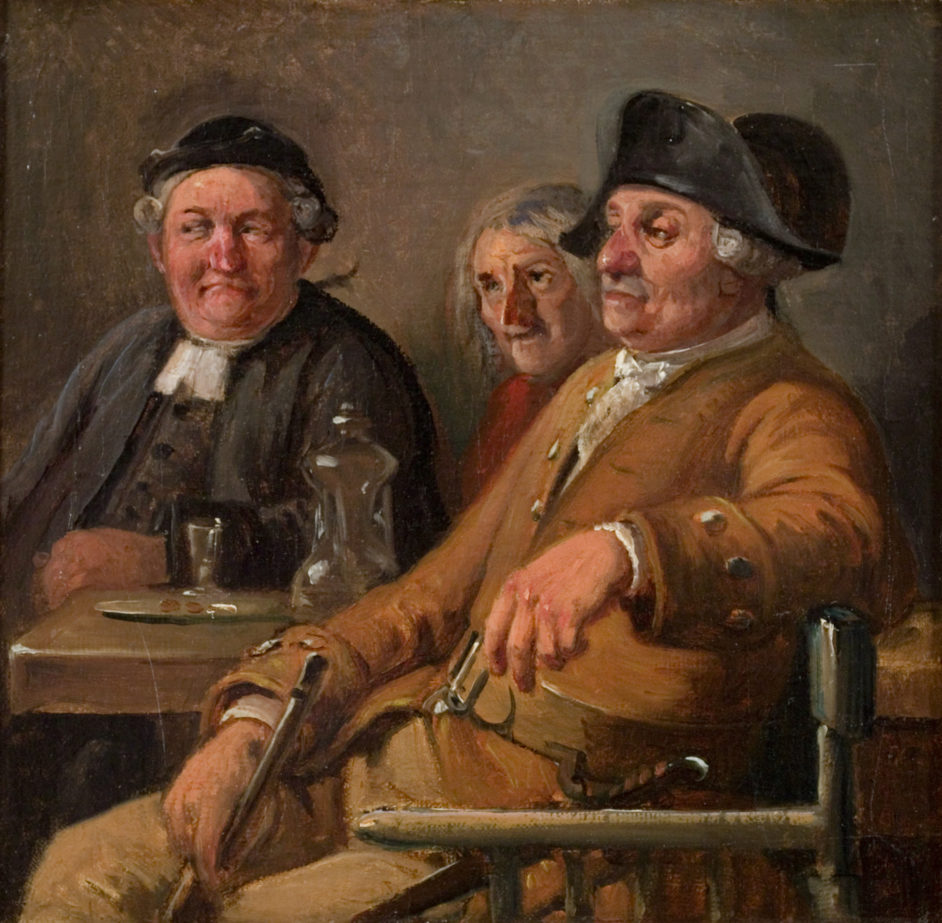
Wilhelm Marstrand's painting of the bailiff Jesper and Peter Degn, two characters from Ludvig Holberg's Jeppe on the Hill.

In Scandinavian folk tradition, the fut (bailiff) was a brutal and ruthless collector and enforcer of the authority granted to him by the king or local landlord. In fairy tales, he was the worst character and often compared to the wolf. The bailiff is a figure in Peter Christian Asbjørnsen's Fanden og futen, printed in Norwegian Folktales. The office of fut was also the most risky office a Dane could hold in Norway – in the early stages of the Danish–Norwegian Union era, several of them were killed by offended and enraged peasants. The heavy tax burden was also the cause of numerous local rebellions.

The bailiff is also a character in several of Ludvig Holberg's plays, including Jeppe on the Hill and Erasmus Montanus.

== See also ==
- Byfoged
- Konungsåren
- Landfoged
