= Solheimsviken =

Coordinates: 60.3776°N 5.3348°E

- Neighbourhood
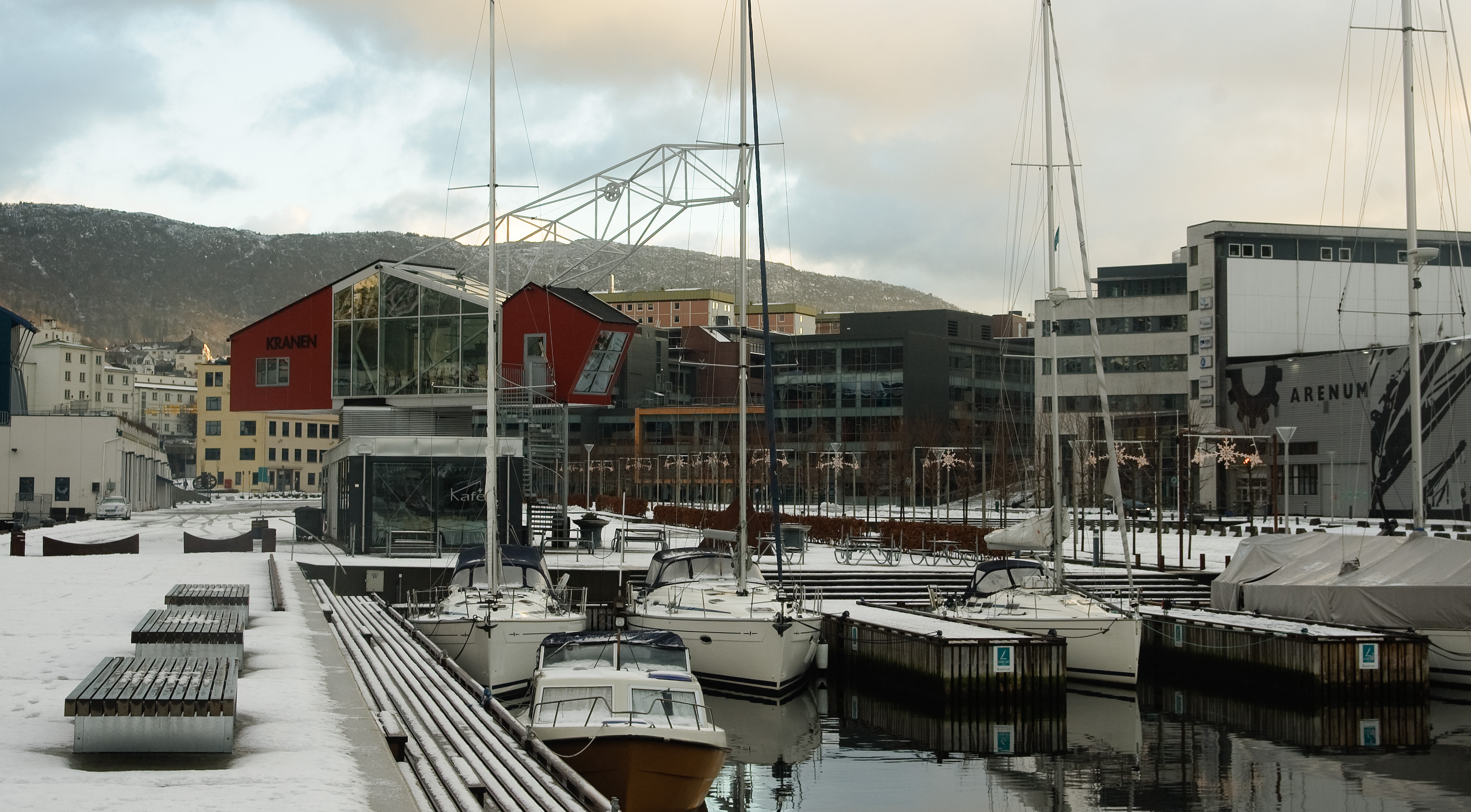
- Office buildings and café in Solheimsviken
- Nickname: Solheimsviken
- Interactive map of Solheimsviken
- Country: Norway
- County: Vestland
- District: Midhordland
- Municipality: Bergen
- Borough: Bergenhus
- Time zone: UTC+01:00 (CET)
  - Summer (DST): UTC+02:00 (CEST)

Solheimsviken is a bay and a neighbourhood in the city of Bergen in Vestland county, Norway. The bay is situated at the end of the Damsgårdssundet strait, near the large Store Lungegårdsvann bay. Located near the city centre of Bergen, Solheimsviken was the first urbanized area in the old Aarstad Municipality (which is now Årstad borough in the city of Bergen).

Solheimsviken has traditionally been dominated by heavy industry, although none of this remains. In recent years, inner Solheimsviken has been developed into a business park by GC Rieber Eiendom, with the presence of several companies including the headquarters of GC Rieber. In recent years, a number of new buildings have been constructed, including among others the regional headquarters for the financial group DNB.
