= Kongsgård =

Type of farm in Scandinavia

Kongsgård (Swedish: kungsgård) is a residence, estate, or farmland that has belonged to or still belongs to the Scandinavian monarchs or royal families.

== History ==
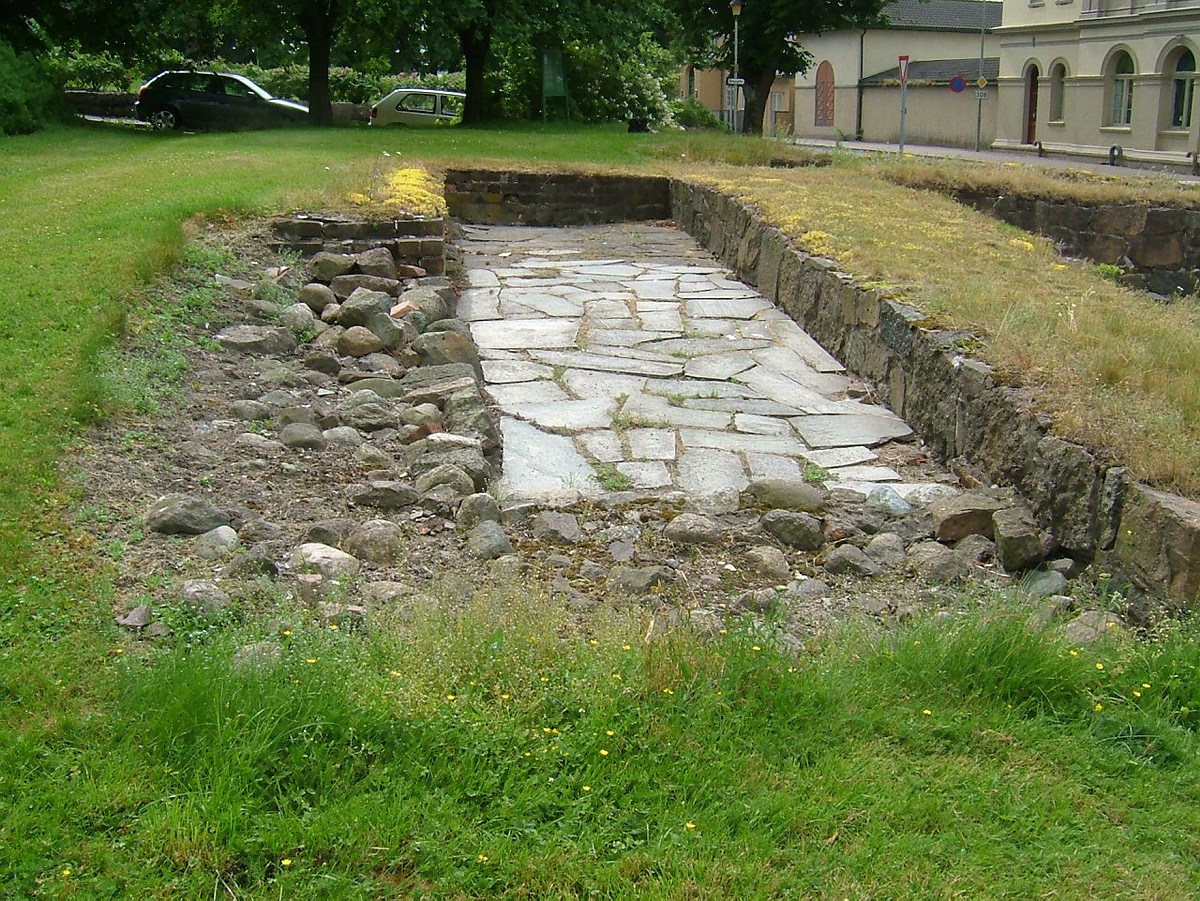
Ruins of the kongsgård estate in Oslo – built by King Håkon Håkonsson

During the Viking Age and early Middle Ages, the nations of Scandinavia were organized as frail political unions, a system which often led to conflicts and internal turmoil. To remain in control, the Scandinavian kings would frequently travel throughout their kingdoms to keep oversight. Kongsgård would then function as temporary residencies for the kings and were often fortified and gradually developed into larger main estates. Throughout the late Middle Ages, many royal estates were re-enforced with castles. Over time, the kings were able to unify their countries and consolidate their power, ruling instead from a single seat or capital.

== Danish kongsgård estates ==
- Corselitze
- Børglum Abbey

== Norwegian kongsgård estates ==
The first King of Norway, King Harald Fairhair, ordered his earls and their hersir to construct estates and farms along the Norwegian coast that would belong to the king and the hird. King Harald would establish the significant kongsgård estate Alrekstad in Bergen which functioned as his seat of power. In the Middle Ages, King Eystein I of Norway would relocate Alrekstad estate in Bergen, building a new fortified palace where Bergenhus fortress is presently located.

Other Kongsgård estates include:

- Oslo Kongsgård estate
- Austrått
- Alrekstad
- Avaldsnes Kongsgård estate
- Kongsgård estate at Fitjar
- Kongsgård estate at Seim, Hordaland
- Værne Kloster
- Utstein Abbey

== Swedish kongsgård estates ==
- Husby (estate)
- Karlberg Palace
- Kaknäs
- Uppsala öd

== Faroese kongsgård estates ==
- Kirkjubøargarður at Kirkjubøur

== See also ==
- Kaiserpfalz
- Konungsåren
