= Årstad Church =

Church in Vestland, Norway

- Årstad kirke
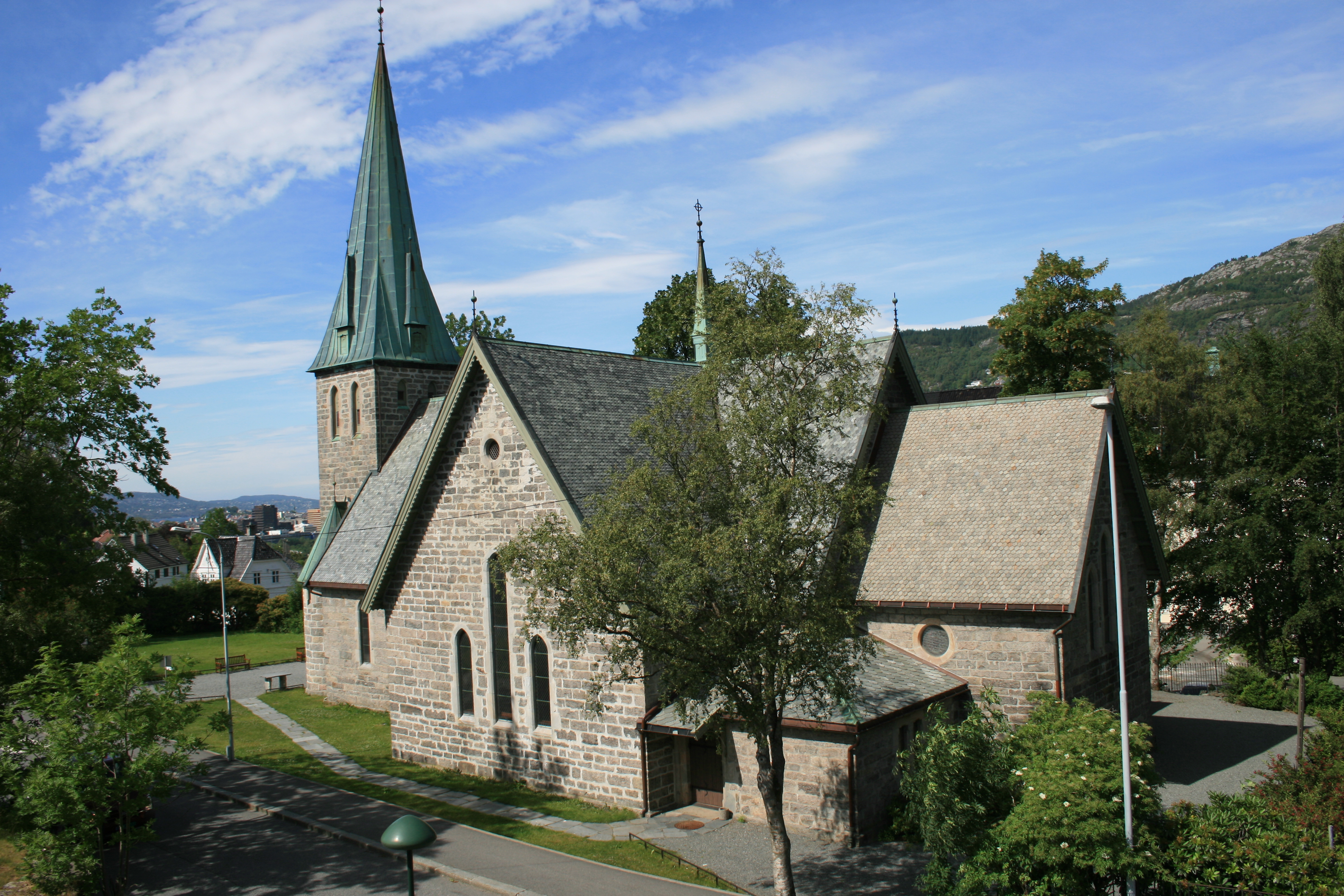
- View of the church
- Årstad Church
- 60°22′30″N 5°21′09″E
- Location: Bergen Municipality, Vestland
- Country: Norway
- Denomination: Church of Norway
- Previous denomination: Catholic Church
- Churchmanship: Evangelical Lutheran

History
- Status: Parish church
- Founded: 13th century
- Consecrated: 26 Nov 1890

Architecture
- Functional status: Active
- Architect: Christian Christie
- Architectural type: Cruciform
- Style: Neo Gothic
- Groundbreaking: 6 Aug 1890
- Completed: 1890 (136 years ago)

Specifications
- Capacity: 560
- Materials: Stone

Administration
- Diocese: Bjørgvin bispedømme
- Deanery: Bergensdalen prosti
- Parish: Årstad
- Norwegian Cultural Heritage Site
- Type: Church
- Status: Protected
- ID: 85983

Årstad Church (Norwegian: Årstad kirke) is a parish church of the Church of Norway in Bergen Municipality in Vestland county, Norway. It is located in the Årstad neighborhood in the city of Bergen. It is the church for the Årstad parish which is part of the Bergensdalen prosti (deanery) in the Diocese of Bjørgvin. The large, stone church was built in a cruciform design and a Neo-Gothic style in 1890 using plans drawn up by the architect Christian Christie. The church seats about 560 people.

== History ==
The earliest existing historical records of Årstad church date back to the year 1564, but it was built before that time, possibly in the 13th century. Originally, the stone church was located about 600 metres (2,000 ft) north of the present church site and it was part of the Fana Church parish. The church was called the Church of the Holy Cross (Norwegian: Kirken Hellig Kors) at that time. In the 1600s, the old church was taken out of regular use due to its age and size and the residents of Årstad were sent to the nearby Birkeland Church. The old stone church burned down and was mostly destroyed in the city fire of 1702. Around the mid-1700s, the people of Årstad were a part of the St. Jørgen's Church. The old church sat unused as a ruin for a long time, and the ruins of the foundation were still visible in 1902. The last remains of the foundation were dug out and removed in 1910.

After a long time without a church, a new church was built to replace the old church in 1890. The new church was located about 600 metres (2,000 ft) south of the old church site. It was designed by Christian Christie and built on what was the old Haukeland farm, south of Store Lungegårdsvannet. The mason Nielsen was responsible for the masonry work, while the builders Askeland and Nævdal were responsible for the carpentry work and Peter Andreas Blix was the supervisor of the whole project. The foundation stone was laid on 6 August 1890 and it was completed about 3 months later. The new church was consecrated on 26 November 1890.

== Gallery ==
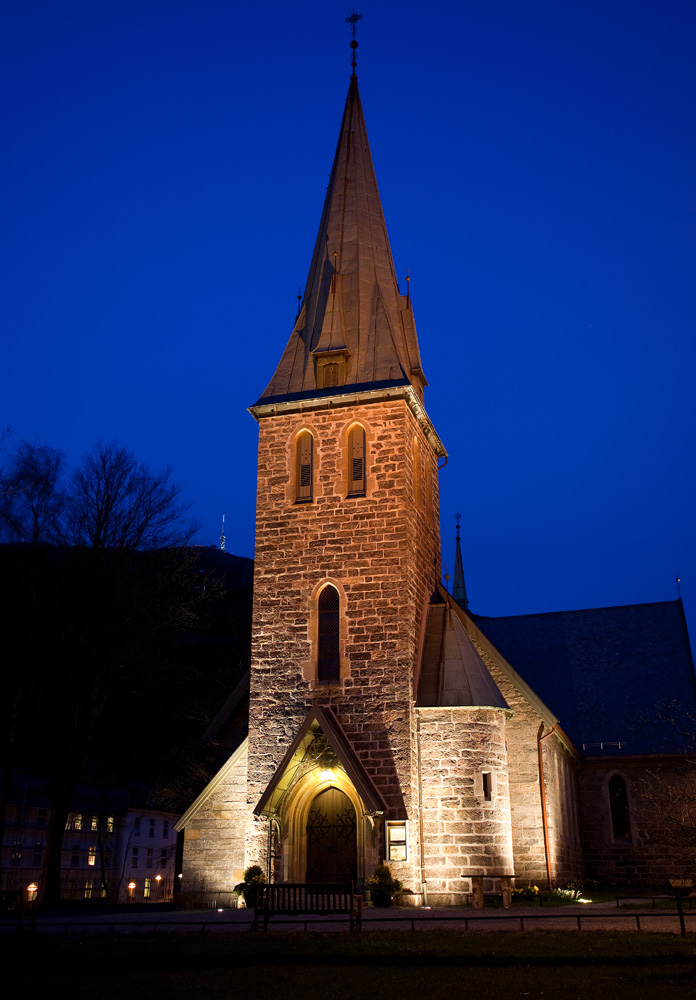

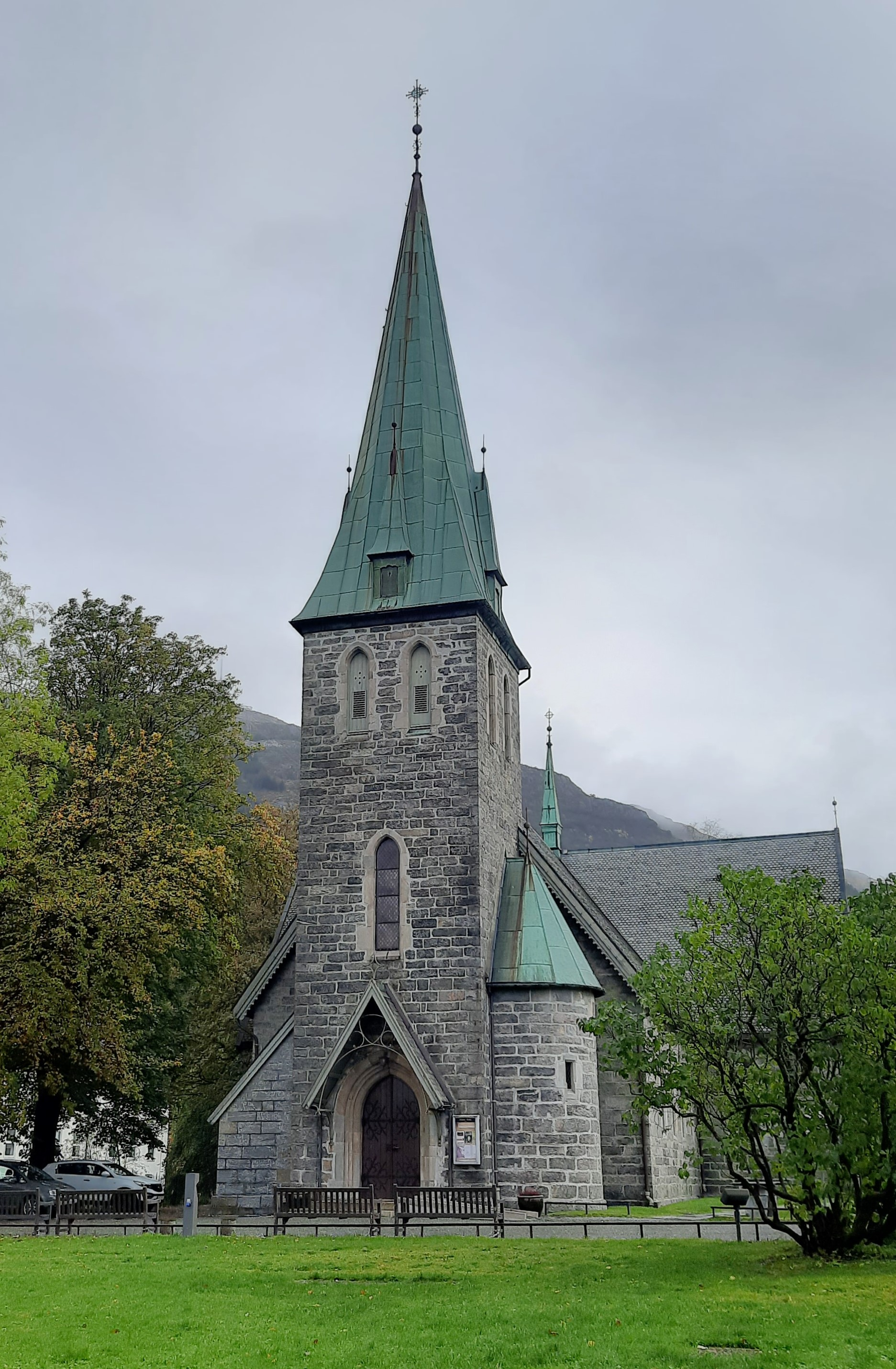

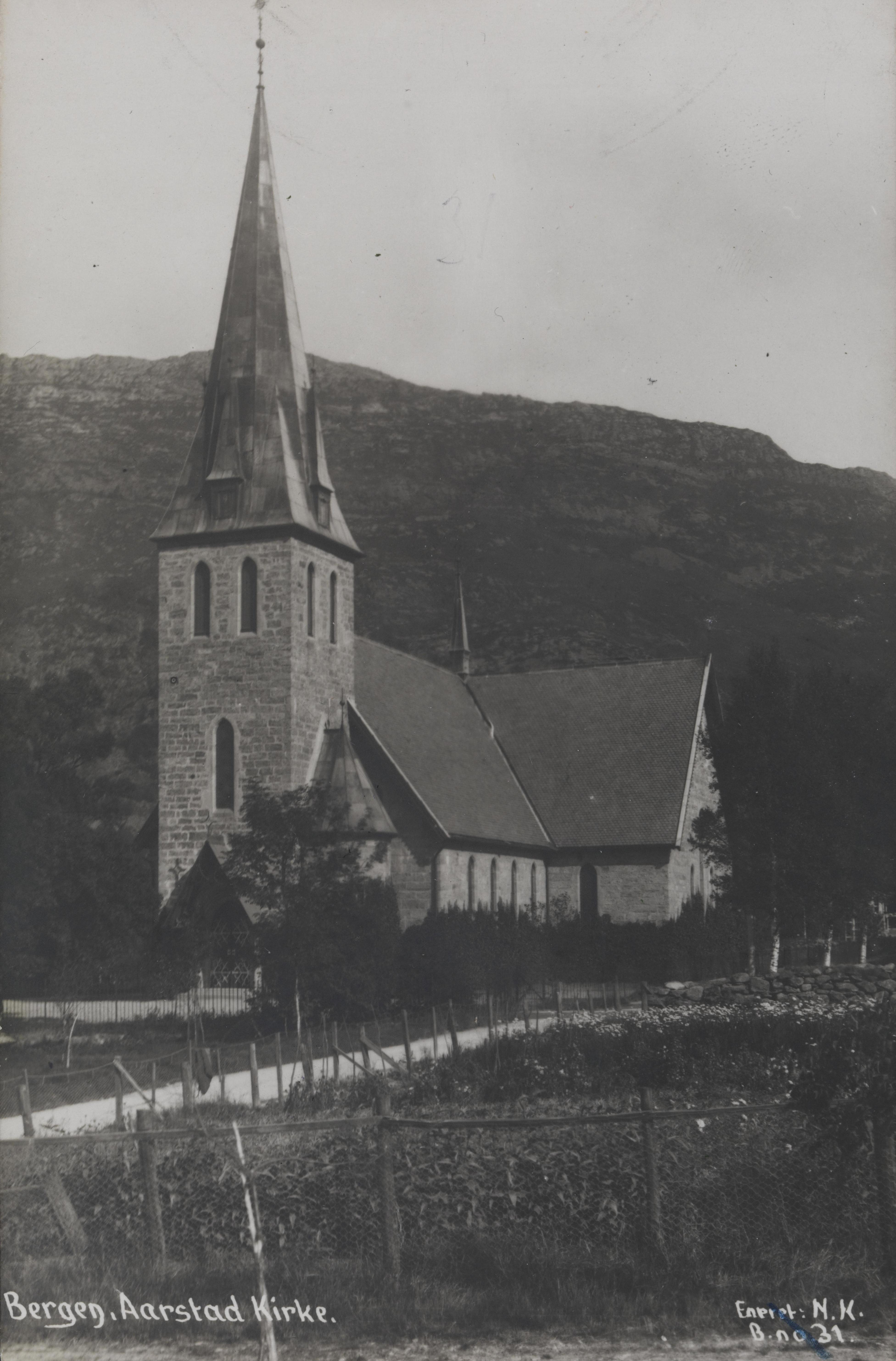

== See also ==
- List of churches in Bjørgvin
