= Konungsåren =

Swedish medieval envoy to Hälsingland

Konungsåren was a medieval envoy (Swedish: fogde) of the Swedish king to Hälsingland. He was authorised to act in the king's stead and was responsible for tax collection in the area. As an agent of the king he would also oversee the thing and safeguard the king's interests during deliberations. He would travel between the kongsgårds of Norrland to perform his duties. The locals were required by law to ensure the safety of the konungsår, and to provide hospitality and horses as needed during his journeys.

The morpheme åre in Old Swedish appears only in Hälsingelagen, Hälsingland's oldest code of laws. In the same document it is stated that the konungsår shall receive wæzla, which seems to be a reference to the Old West Norse hospitality tradition veizla. By the same logic åre could mirror the årmann, who was a royal ombudsman in Norway.
