= Husaby =

Settlement in Götene Municipality, Sweden

Coordinates: 58°31′31″N 13°22′48″E

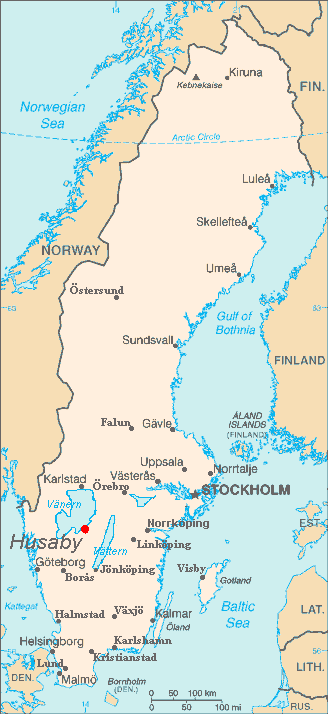
Husaby in Sweden

Husaby is a village, near Kinnekulle, belonging to Götene Municipality in the province of Västergötland, Sweden.

== Husaby Church ==
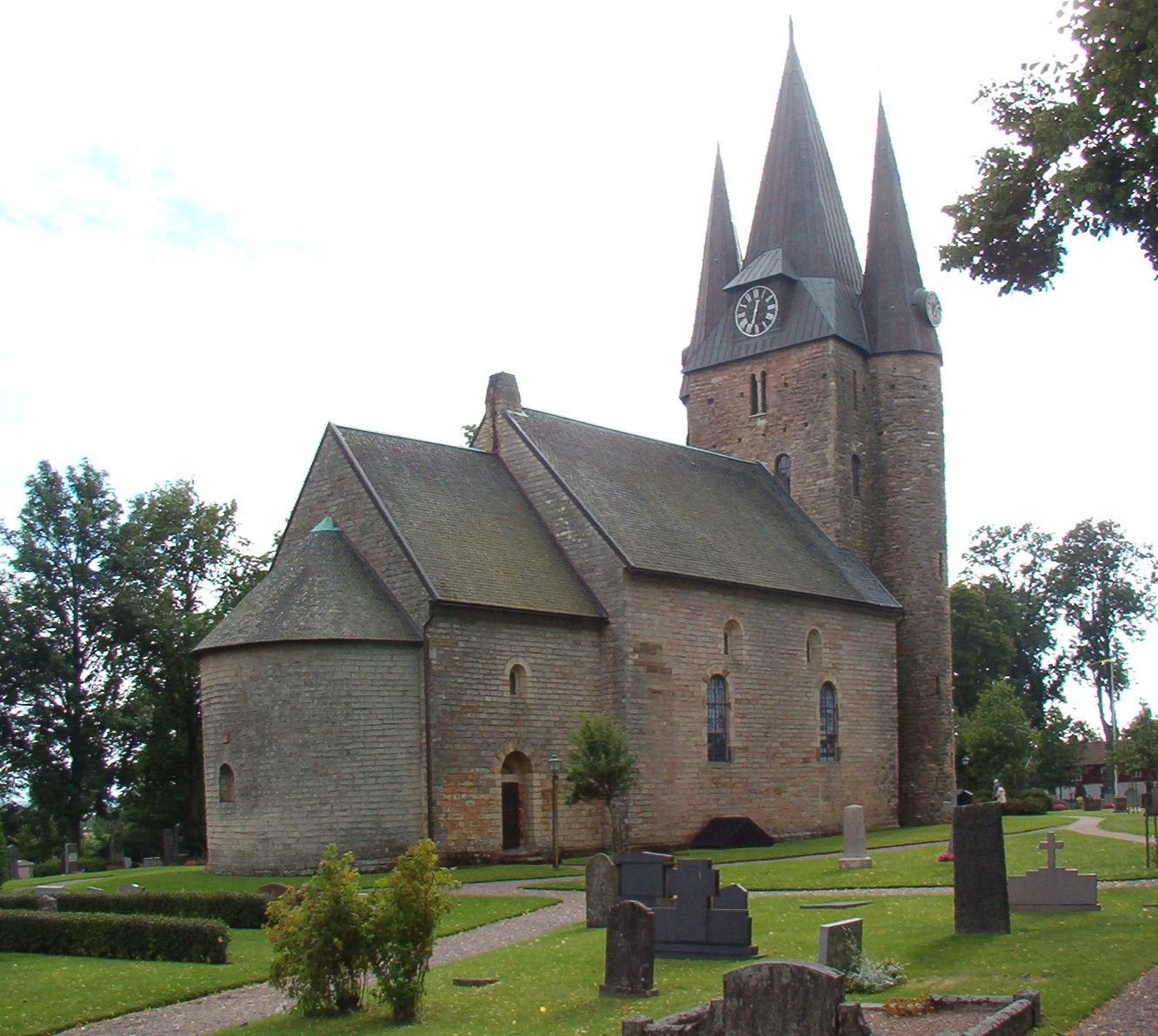
Husaby Church, a congregation of the Evangelical-Lutheran Church of Sweden

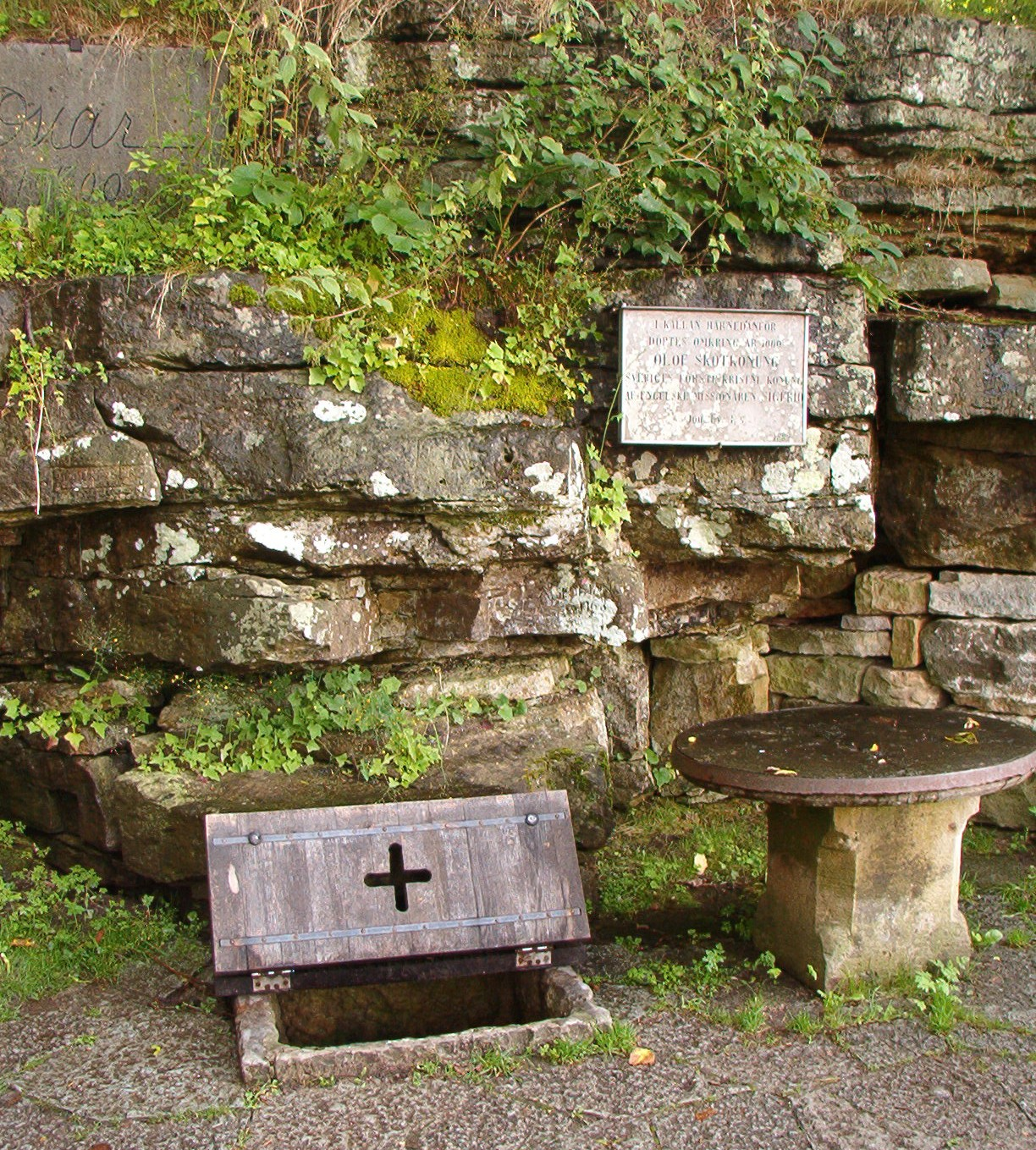
St Sigfrid's holy well

Husaby is most known for Husaby Church (Husaby kyrka) a medieval stone church. During the early 11th century, it was a wooden church. A little later, the original church was replaced by the current stone church. The tower was built in the late 11th century and in the early 12th century the stone church. Olof Skötkonung (c. 980–1022), the first Christian king of Sweden, is rumoured to have allowed himself to be baptised at a well by the church in 1008 possibly by English missionary Saint Sigfrid of Sweden.

Architecturally, Husaby Church is remarkable for its steep walls and high towers, arguably the only Romanesque architecture in Sweden of that kind. The church belonged to a network of royal estates called Uppsala öd.

The altarpiece was performed by Flemish sculptor George Baselaque and donated to the church in 1679 by Magnus Gabriel De la Gardie (1622–1686). One of the oldest objects in the church is the baptismal font in sandstone from the early 13th century.

In 1901, when the church was restored, the lime layer was knocked away from the arches and walls. C W Pettersson, who worked with architect Axel Herman Hägg (1835–1921), made a proposal for the reconstruction of the original decor in the choir from the 15th century, which was approved by the National Heritage Board.

== See also ==
- Husby (estate)
