= Lille Lungegårdsvannet =

Lake in Bergen, Norway

Lille Lungegårdsvannet Smålungeren
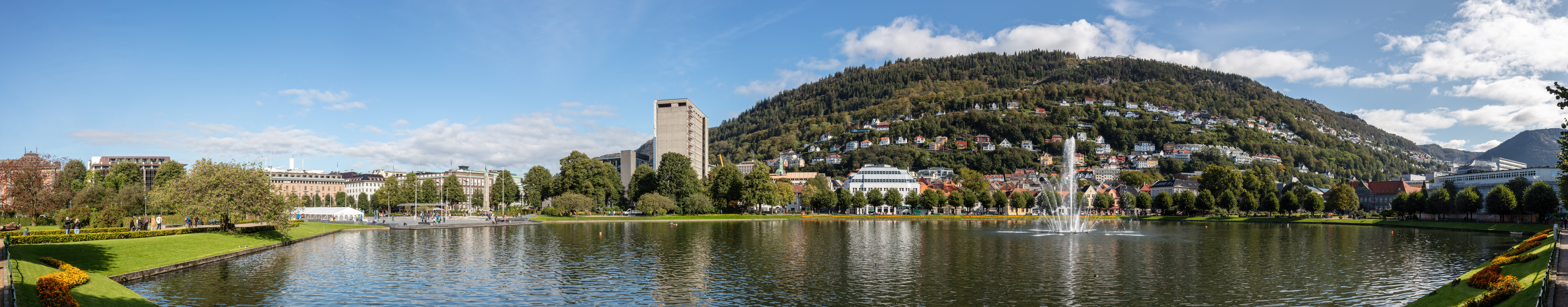
- Interactive map of Lille Lungegårdsvannet; Smålungeren
- Location: Bergen Municipality, Vestland
- Coordinates: 60.39044°N 5.32836°E
- Basin countries: Norway
- Max. length: 215 metres (705 ft)
- Max. width: 150 metres (490 ft)
- Surface area: 20,500 m^{2} (5.1 acres)
- Shore length^{1}: 700 metres (2,300 ft)
- Surface elevation: 0 metres (0 ft)
- References: NVE
- ^{1} Shore length is not a well-defined measure.

Lille Lungegårdsvannet or Smålungeren is a small 5-acre (0.020 km^{2}) lake in the centre of the city of Bergen in Vestland county, Norway. The octagonal lake is a natural lake that was historically connected to the nearby Store Lungegårdsvannet bay via a short strait, but the strait was filled in 1926. Today the lake is located in a park in the city centre. There is a large decorative fountain located in the central part of the lake.

== History ==
Historically, the lake was much larger than it is now. As the city grew, Lille Lungegårdsvannet slowly but steadily shrank to its present size by adding fill to the sides of the lake to reclaim land. The sides were straightened and it was artificially made into an octagon shape. It finally reached its present shape during the mid-20th century. Historically, there was a short strait that ran between this lake and the nearby Store Lungegårdsvannet bay. As this lake was reduced in size, the strait was also changed. In 1926, the strait between this lake and Store Lungegårdsvannet was removed and replaced by an underground culvert system. Because of this underground connection, it is possible to see fluctuations in the height of the lake due to the tide.

== Gallery ==
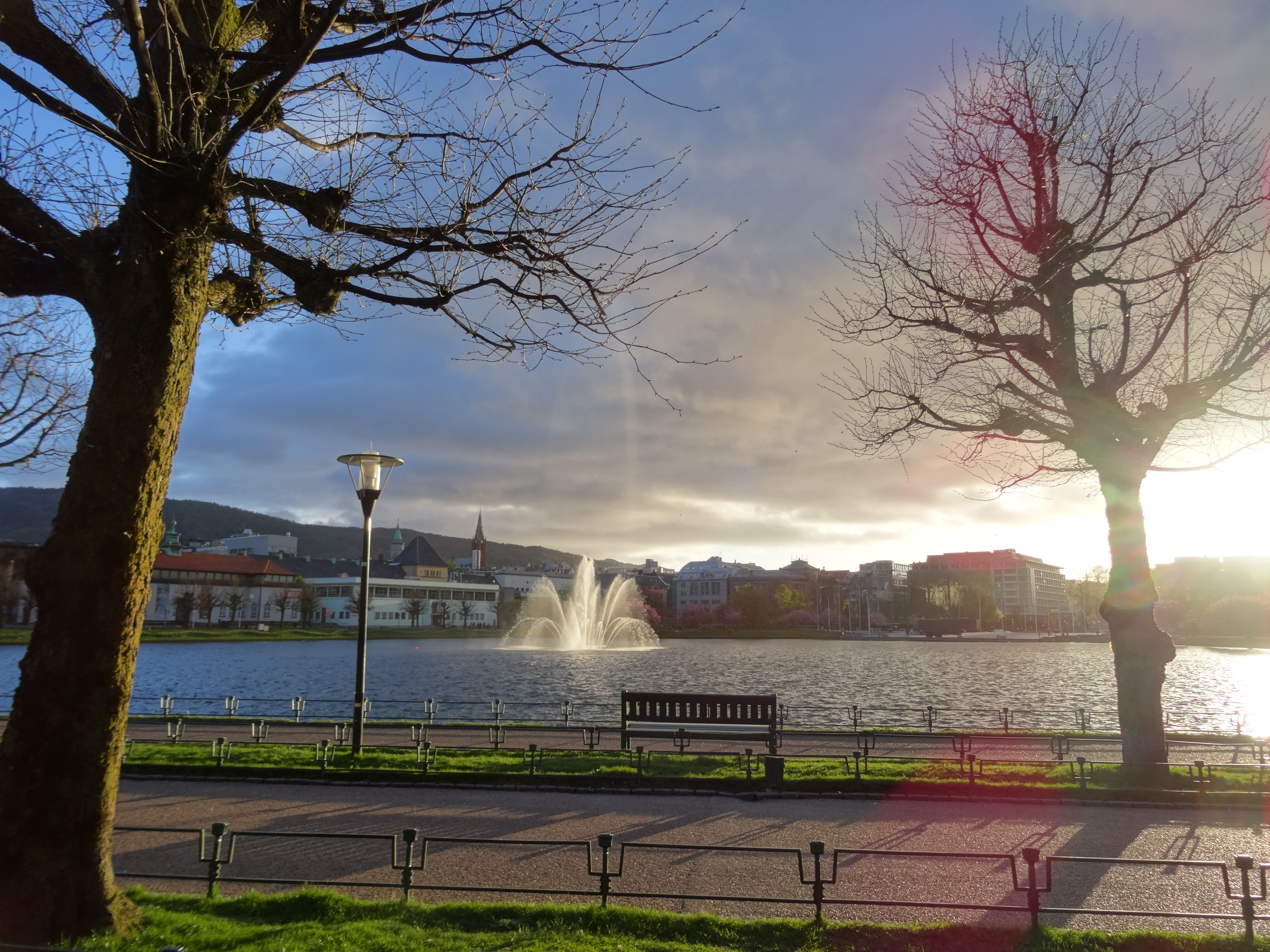

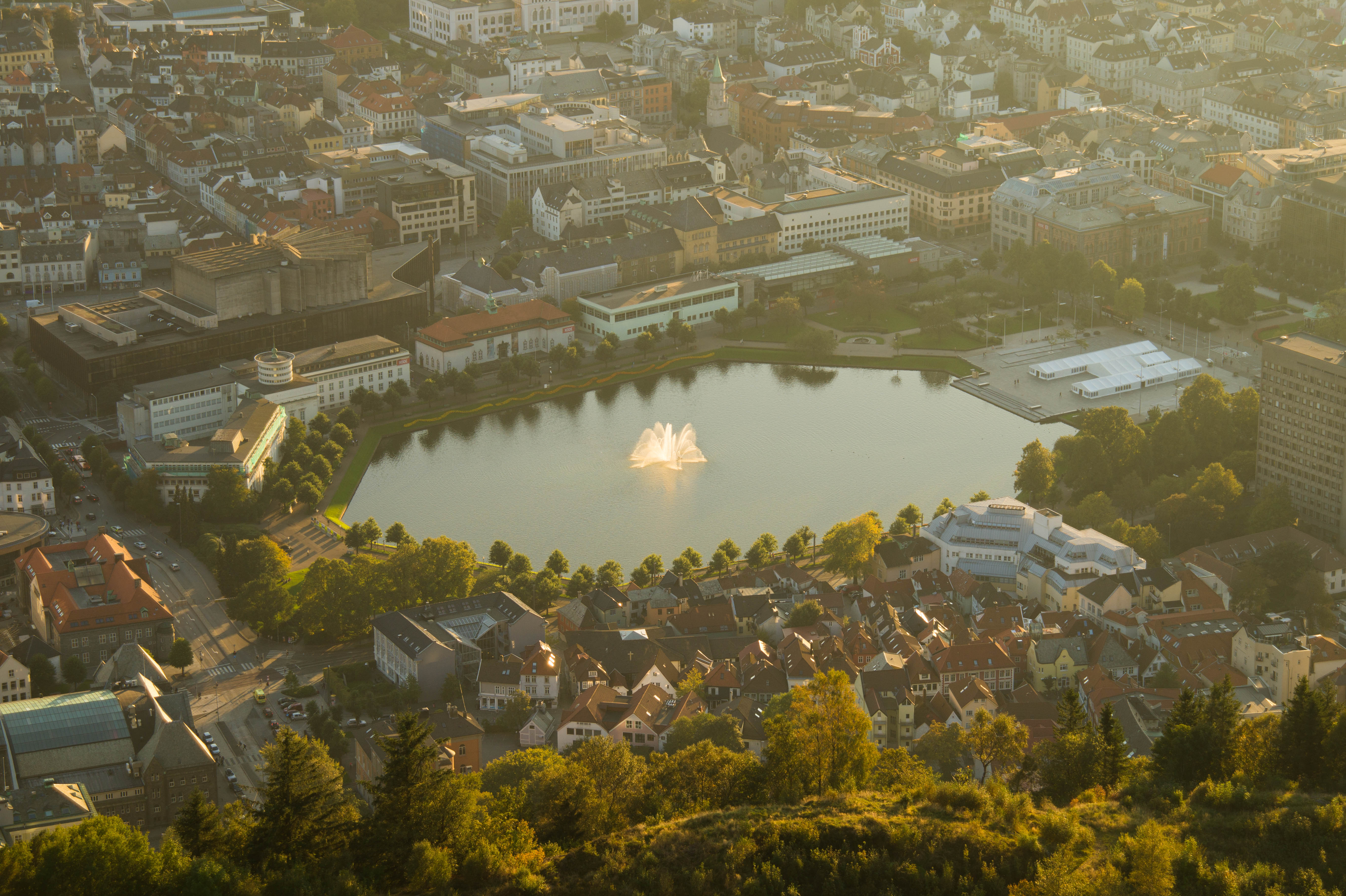
View from above

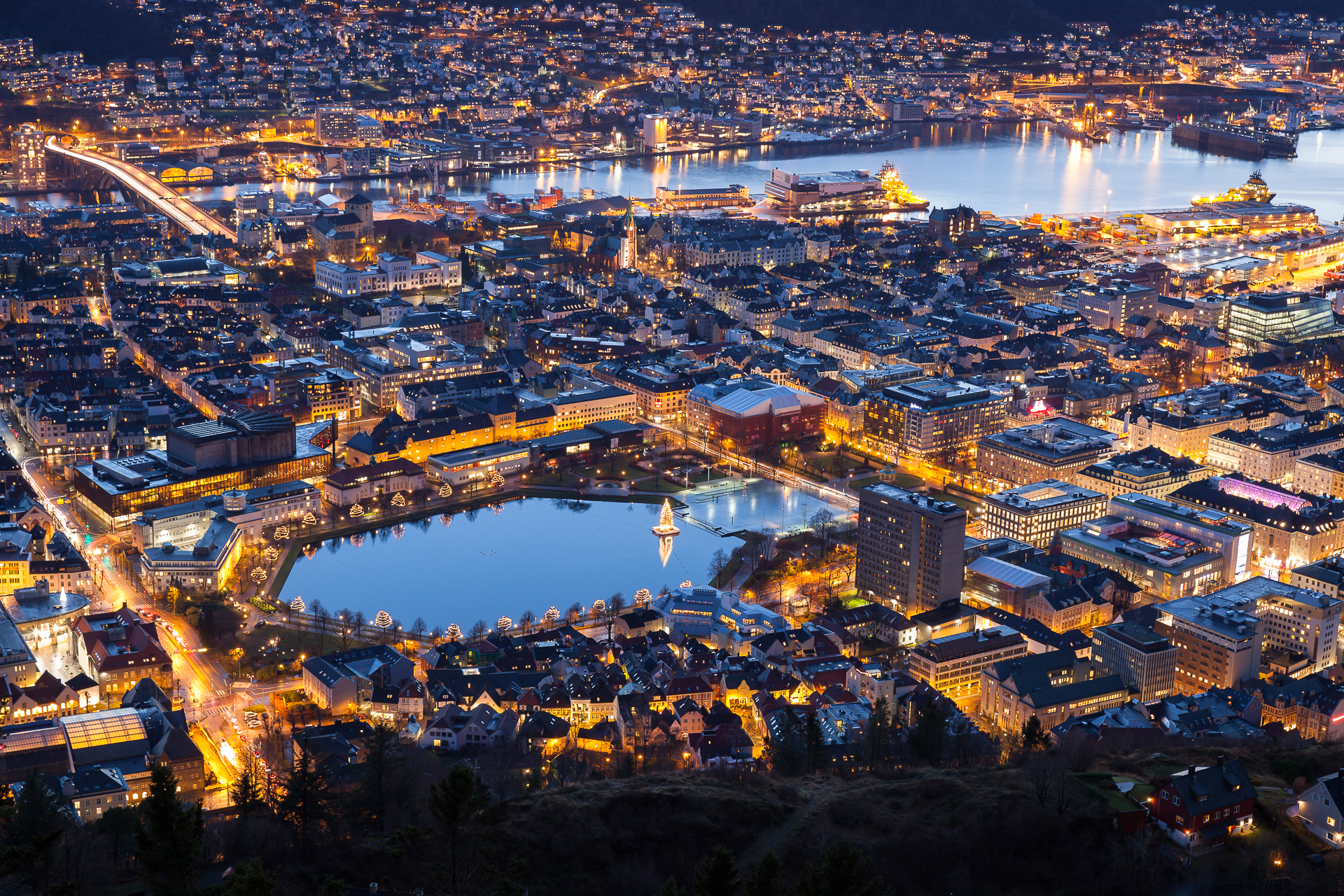

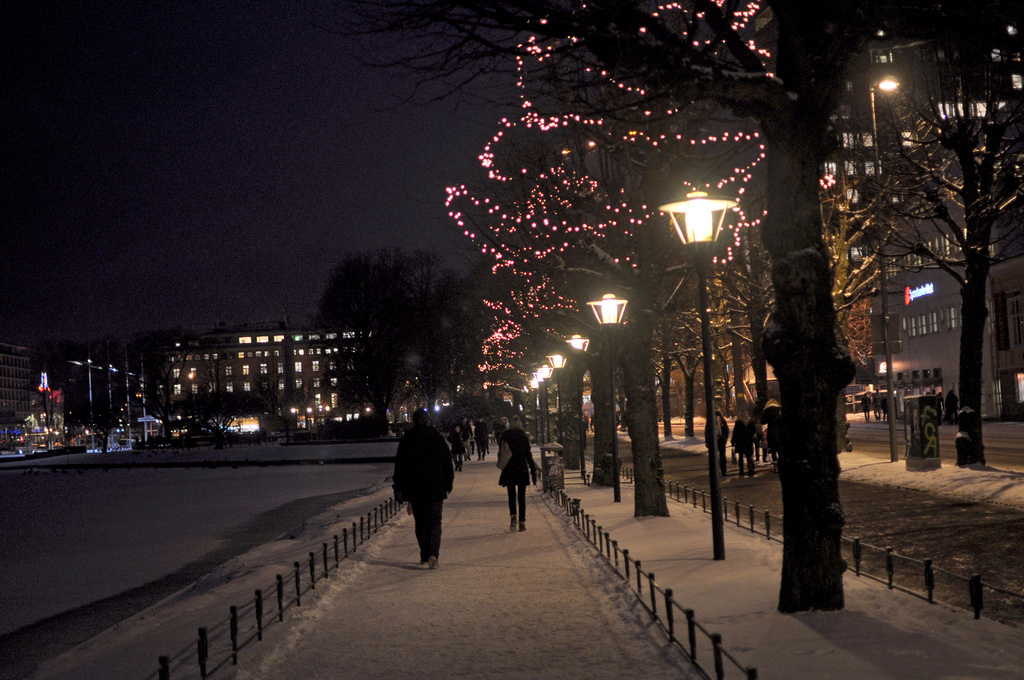

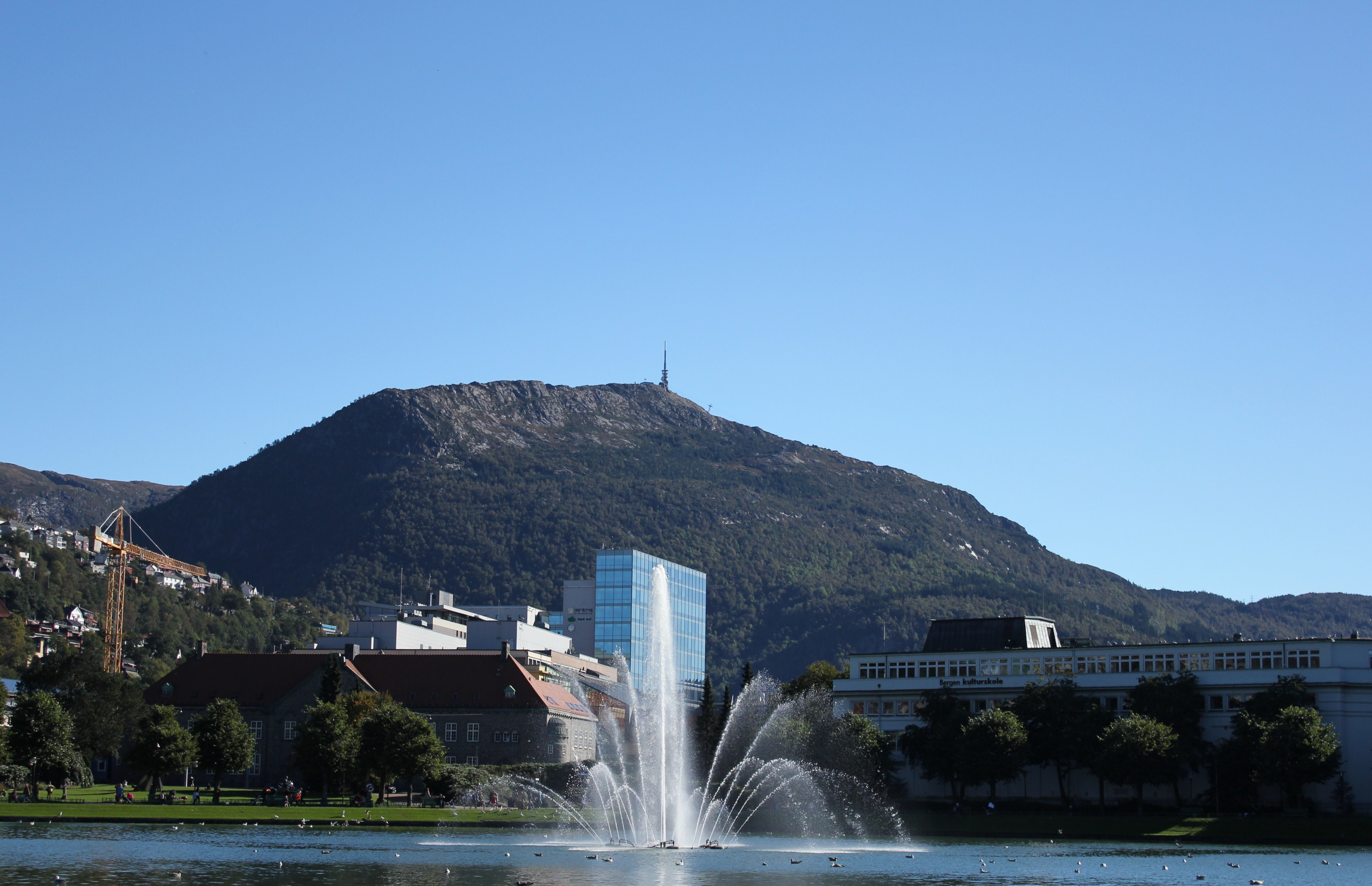
View towards Ulriken

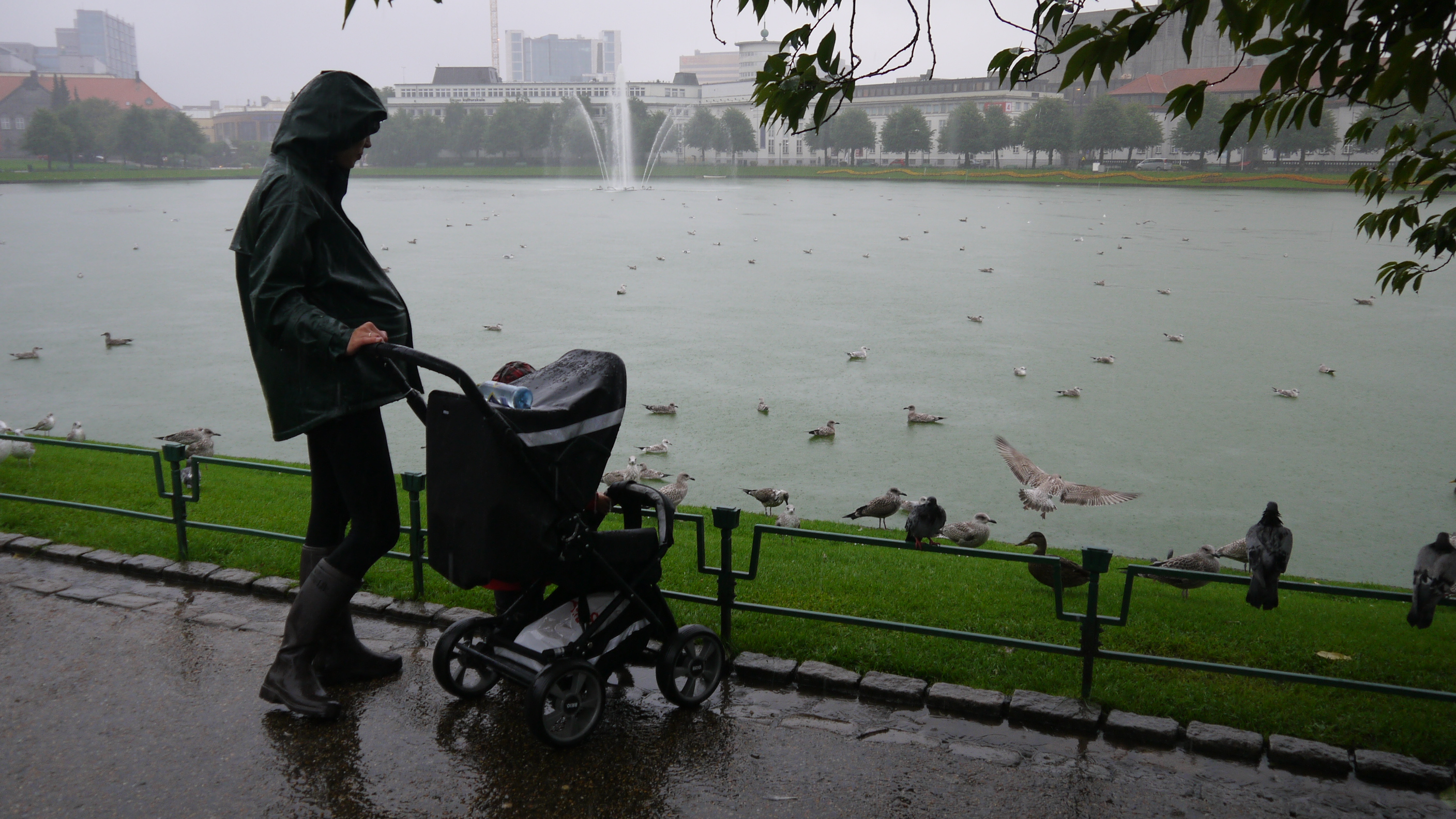

== See also ==
- List of lakes in Norway
