= Årstad Municipality =

Former municipality in Hordaland, Norway

Årstad Municipality Aarstad Municipality Årstad herred Aarstad herred
- Former municipality
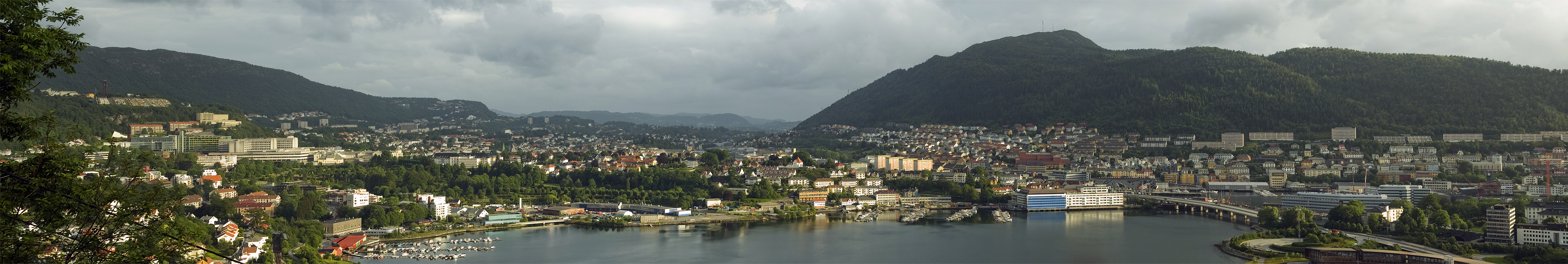
- Panorama of Årstad from the mountain Fløyen

- Hordaland within Norway

- Årstad within Hordaland
- Coordinates: 60°22′35″N 05°21′41″E
- Country: Norway
- County: Hordaland
- District: Midhordland
- Established: 1 Jan 1838
  - Created as: Formannskapsdistrikt
- Disestablished: 1 July 1915
  - Succeeded by: Bergen Municipality
- Administrative centre: Kronstad

Government
  - Mayor (1906–1915): Gerdt Meyer Bruun

Area (upon dissolution)
  - Total: 21.37 km^{2} (8.25 sq mi)
- Highest elevation: 657 m (2,156 ft)

Population (1915)
  - Total: 7,463
  - Density: 349.2/km^{2} (904.5/sq mi)
- Time zone: UTC+01:00 (CET)
  - Summer (DST): UTC+02:00 (CEST)
- ISO 3166 code: NO-1280

Årstad or Aarstad is a former municipality in the old Hordaland county, Norway. The 21.37-square-kilometre (8.25 sq mi) municipality existed from 1838 until its dissolution in 1915. The area is now part of Bergen Municipality in the traditional district of Midhordland in Vestland county. The administrative centre was the village of Kronstad. The area of the old municipality somewhat corresponds to the present-day borough of Årstad, just south of the city centre of Bergen. The municipality is named after the medieval farm Alrekstad, located on this site.

== General information ==
The parish of Aarstad (now spelled Årstad) was established as a municipality 1 January 1838 (see formannskapsdistrikt law). Originally, it sat south of both the city of Bergen and the rural municipality called Bergen Landdistrikt. Aarstad and the city of Bergen worked closely together from the start since both made up one large urban area. In fact, most of Aarstad had been part of the Bergen Police District since 1808 (before the municipality was even established).

On 1 July 1915, Årstad Municipality (population: 7,463) was merged with the city of Bergen (population: 76,867) increasing the area of Bergen Municipality from 13.9 to 34.9 square kilometres (5.4 to 13.5 sq mi). The merger happened after a long political process, following decades of close cooperation between the two municipalities. The merger also moved the area of Årstad Municipality from Søndre Bergenhus county to Bergen county.

=== Name ===
The municipality (originally the parish) is named after the old Aarstad royal estate (Old Norse: Álreksstaðir) since the first Årstad Church was built there. The first element is identical to the old male name Álrekr. The male name is a compound word that is derived from al- which means "all" and rekr which means "mighty". This is the same root as the nearby mountain Ulriken. The last element is the plural form of staðr which means "town" or "abode".

During its time as a municipality, it was always spelled Aarstad. On 21 December 1917 (after the municipality had been dissolved and merged into Bergen), a royal resolution enacted the 1917 Norwegian language reforms. Prior to this change, the name was spelled Aarstad with the digraph "aa", and after this reform, the name was spelled Årstad, using the letter å instead. Since then, when referring to the old municipality, the new spelling is used, but the letter "Å" was never used while the municipality existed.

=== Churches ===
The Church of Norway had one parish (sokn) within Årstad Municipality. At the time of the municipal dissolution, it was part of the Årstad prestegjeld and the Bergen domprosti (arch-deanery) in the Diocese of Bjørgvin.

Churches in Årstad Municipality
Parish (sokn)	Church name	Location of the church	Year built
Årstad	Årstad Church	Årstad	1890

== Geography ==
The municipality of Årstad (spelled Aarstad during its time in existence ) was a southern suburb of the city of Bergen, mostly located in the valley to the south of the bay Store Lungegårdsvannet and the Puddefjorden all the way south to the village of Nattland. The mountain Ulriken lies to the east of Årstad and the mountain Løvstakken lies to the west. The highest point in the municipality was the 657-metre (2,156 ft) tall mountain Haukelandsstikkene, on the border with Haus Municipality.

Hamre Municipality was located to the north, Haus Municipality was located to the east, Fana Municipality was located to the south, Askøy Municipality was located to the west, and Bergen Municipality was located to the northwest.

== Government ==
While it existed, Årstad Municipality was governed by a municipal council of directly elected representatives. The mayor was indirectly elected by a vote of the municipal council. The municipality was under the jurisdiction of the Gulating Court of Appeal.

=== Mayors ===
The mayor (Norwegian: ordfører) of Årstad Municipality was the political leader of the municipality and the chairperson of the municipal council. The following people have held this position:

- 1838–1850: Johannes Christopher Wiese
- 1850–1856: Ole Nicolai Løberg
- 1856–1860: Samuel B. Meyer
- 1860–1862: A. Christie
- 1862–1876: Hjalmar Løberg
- 1876–1880: Anders Paulsen
- 1880–1882: A. Christie
- 1882–1887: Carl Berg
- 1888–1896: Jacob C. Meyer
- 1896–1899: Samuel B. Michelsen
- 1899–1902: Statius Arentz
- 1902–1906: Halvor Kloster
- 1906–1915: Gerdt Meyer Bruun

== See also ==
- List of former municipalities of Norway
