= Uppsala öd =

Coordinates: 59°53′55″N 17°37′50″E

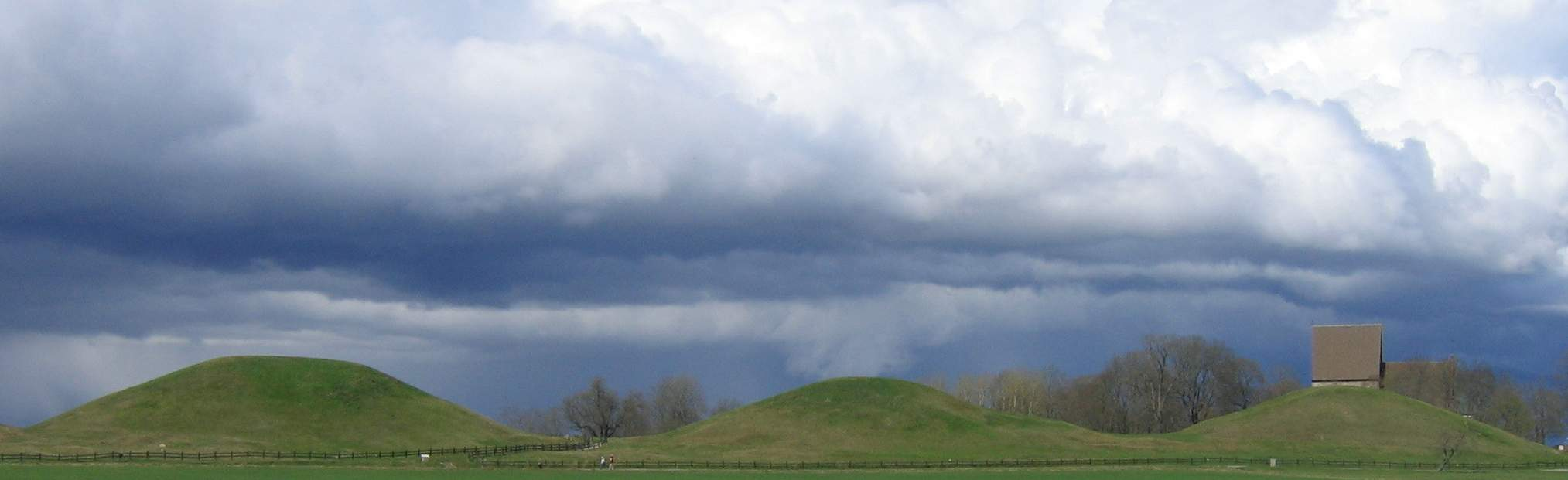
The three large "royal mounds" at Gamla Uppsala. Uppsala was the centre of Uppsala öd, to which it gave its name.

Uppsala öd (Old Norse: Uppsala auðr or Uppsala øðr, meaning Uppsala domains or wealth of Uppsala) was the name given to the collection of estates which was the property of the Swedish Crown in medieval Sweden. Its purpose was to finance the Swedish king, originally the "king of Uppsala", and the income from these estates supported the king and his retinue while he travelled through the country. There was one estate of this kind in most hundreds and it was usually called Husaby. It was the home of the king's tax collector, and it was at the local estate of Uppsala öd that the people of the hundred delivered their taxes in form of goods. The estates were most common in Svealand.

The origins of Uppsala öd are prehistoric and unknown, but according to a tradition documented by the thirteenth-century historian Snorri Sturluson it originated as a donation given by the god Freyr to the Temple at Uppsala which he founded.

Freyr reisti at Uppsölum hof mikit, ok setti þar höfuðstað sinn; lagði þar til allar skyldir sínar, lönd ok lausa aura; þá hófst Uppsala auðr, ok hefir haldizt æ síðan.

Frey built a great temple at Upsal, made it his chief seat, and gave it all his taxes, his land, and goods. Then began the Upsal domains, which have remained ever since.

It was stated in the Swedish medieval laws that Uppsala öd was to follow the royal institution intact without any lost property. The full extent of Uppsala öd is unknown, but individual estates are enumerated in the Law of Hälsingland and in the younger Westrogothic law.

During the thirteenth century, the system became obsolete for the king and many of the estates passed to the nobility and the church, in spite of the laws that forbade any diminution of the property. The reason for this was that the king's subjects began to pay monetary taxes.

Uppsala öd contained the first documented pieces of what would become Swedish State property.

== A selection of estates belonging to Uppsala öd ==
- Gamla Uppsala
- Husby at Vendel
- Fornsigtuna
- Husaby
- Ränninge on Fogdö
- Hovgården on Adelsö
