= Store Lungegårdsvannet =

Bay in Bergen, Norway

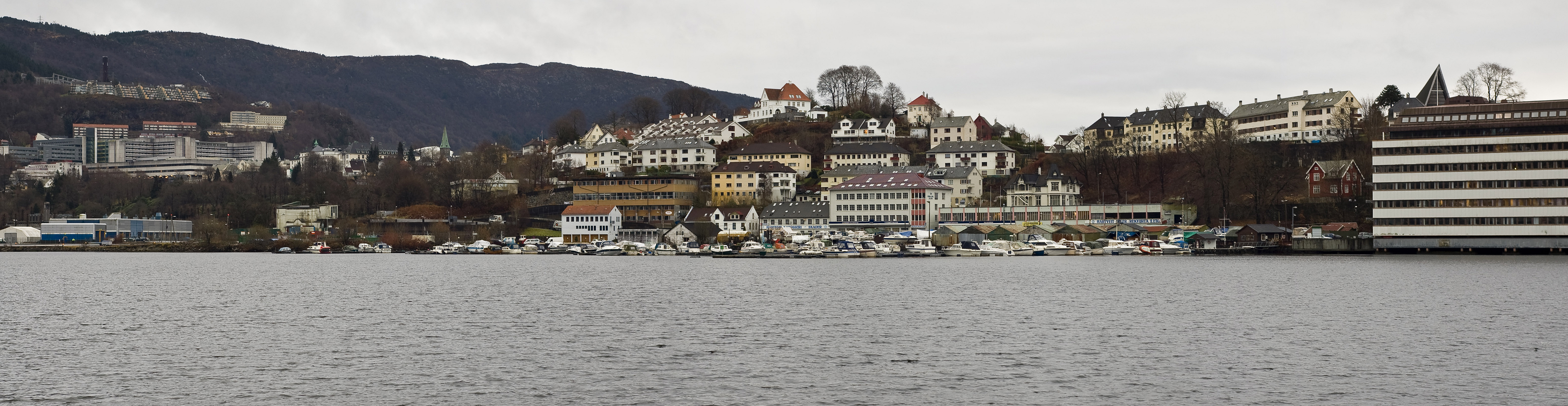
- Panorama of the southern shore of Store Lungegaardsvann, taken from the north-western shore. Bergen's hospital, Haukeland Universitetssykehus, can be seen to the left.
- Interactive map of Store Lungegårdsvannet
- Location: Vestland county, Norway
- Coordinates: 60.38207°N 5.34355°E
- Type: Fjord
- Basin countries: Norway
- Max. length: 900 metres (0.6 mi)
- Max. width: 700 metres (0.4 mi)

Store Lungegårdsvannet is a bay located in Bergen Municipality in Vestland county, Norway. The bay lies in the centre of the city of Bergen, separating the city centre, located in the borough of Bergenhus, from the southern boroughs of the city: Årstad, Fana, and Ytrebygda. The bay is situated at the end of the Puddefjorden.

== History ==
The bay is named after the farm of Lungegården, the estate of the Danish nobleman Vincens Lunge. In the Middle Ages, the bay was named Alrekstadvågen, after the royal farm of Alrekstad. Historically, the lake Lille Lungegårdsvannet was located just northwest of the bay, and it emptied into the bay. In the 1930s, the bay, and the area surrounding it, was an attractive recreation area for the inhabitants of the city, with boat harbours and beaches. Starting in the 1950s, the bay was seen as a resource for the city to cover the acute need for free, unused land. As a result, several large parts of the bay, mainly on the northern shore, have been filled in, so much so that there is no longer any connection between this bay and the lake Lille Lungegårdsvannet. There is over 700 metres (2,300 ft) of land between the now-landlocked lake and the bay. The Nygård Bridge crosses the western end of the bay, as the water flows into the Puddefjorden.

== Commerce ==
There is a marina located on the shores of Store Lungegårdsvannet.
