= Birkeland Church =

Church in Vestland, Norway

- Birkeland kirke
- Nesttun kirke
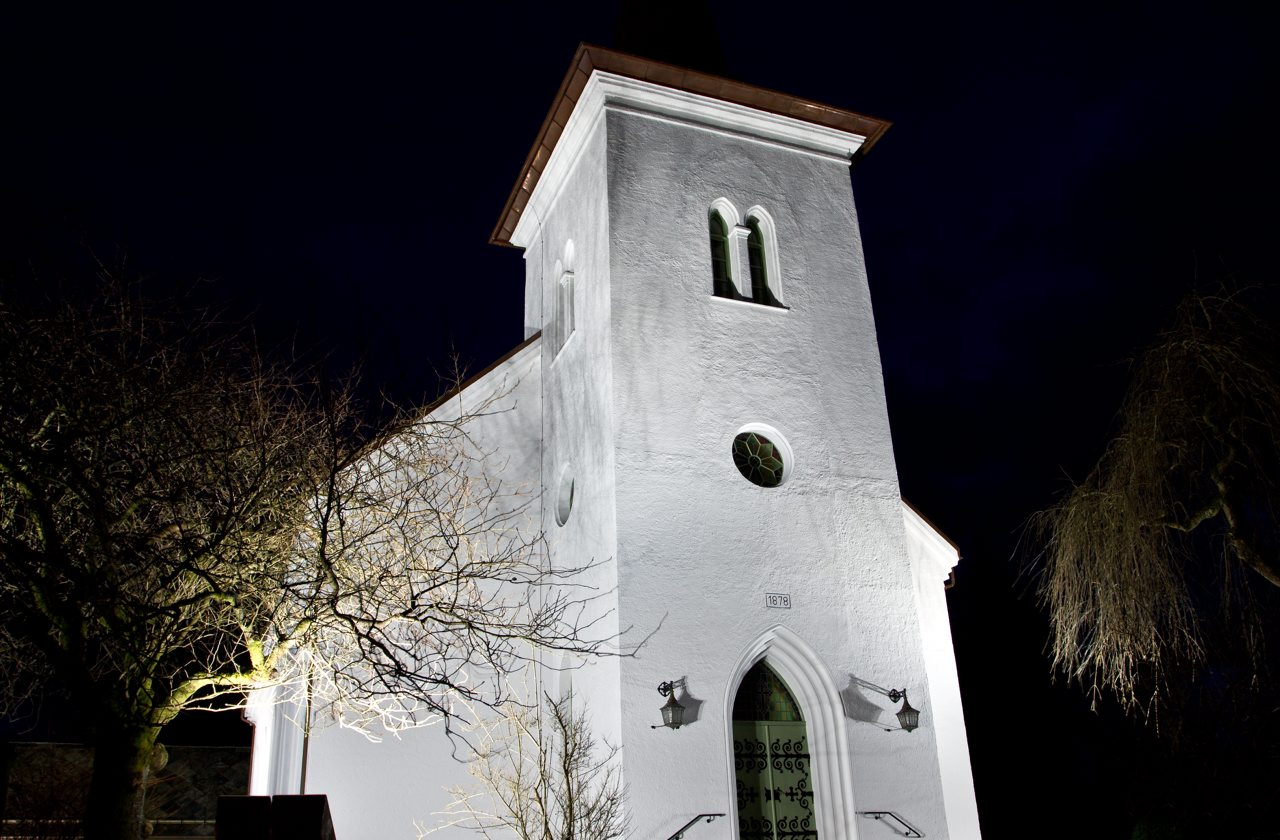
- View of the church
- Birkeland Church
- 60°18′57″N 5°21′23″E
- Location: Bergen Municipality, Vestland
- Country: Norway
- Denomination: Church of Norway
- Previous denomination: Catholic Church
- Churchmanship: Evangelical Lutheran

History
- Status: Parish church
- Founded: 13th century
- Consecrated: 21 Nov 1878

Architecture
- Functional status: Active
- Architect: Giovanni Müller
- Architectural type: Long church
- Completed: 1878 (148 years ago)

Specifications
- Capacity: 300
- Materials: Stone

Administration
- Diocese: Bjørgvin bispedømme
- Deanery: Fana prosti
- Parish: Birkeland
- Norwegian Cultural Heritage Site
- Type: Church
- Status: Listed by municipality
- ID: 83888

Birkeland Church (Norwegian: Birkeland kirke or Nesttun kirke) is a parish church of the Church of Norway in Bergen Municipality in Vestland county, Norway. It is located in the Nesttun neighborhood of Fana in the city of Bergen. It is the church for the Birkeland parish which is part of the Fana prosti (deanery) in the Diocese of Bjørgvin. The white, stone church was built in a long church style in 1878 using designs by the architect Giovanni Jacob Harbitz Müller. The church seats about 300 people. The church has a unique tower with an octagonal copper-clad steeple.

== History ==
The earliest existing historical records of the church date back to the year 1306, but it was built before that time. The first church in Birkeland was a wooden stave church that was likely built during the 1200s. That church stood about 2 kilometres (1.2 mi) southeast of the present church. (Today, there is a historical marker with a plaque where the previous church once stood). Shortly before the year 1642, the old church was torn down and replaced with a new timber-framed long church. An inspection report from 1686 describes the church as having a 11.3-by-8.8-metre (37 ft × 29 ft) nave and a 7.5-by-6.3-metre (25 ft × 21 ft) choir, and a 3.8-by-3.8-metre (12 ft × 12 ft) church porch with a tower on the west end of the nave.

The wooden church was sold to private owners Arne Olsen Øvre Totland and Lars Olsen Øvre Birkeland in 1724. In 1839, the church was bought back by the parish. Due to maintenance issues and population growth, in the 1870s, it was decided to replace the old church. A new church site was chosen about 2 kilometres (1.2 mi) away in Nesttun. A new, larger stone church was built at the new site in 1877–1878. The architect for the church was Giovanni Müller, while Christian Christiansen Gyldenpris, Ivar Rasmussen Fyllingen, Lars Olsen Hougsdal, and Askild Aase was responsible for construction work. The new church was consecrated on 21 November 1878. Soon afterwards, the old church was torn down. In 1915–1916, the nave was redesigned using the designs of Gerhard Fischer and his father Adolph Fischer. In 1926, the sacristies were enlarged and the tower was rebuilt, again using designs by Gerhard Fischer. In 1960–1961, the nave was rebuilt under the leadership of Øistein Nestaas, and also on that occasion the northern sacristy was expanded and converted into a chapel.

== Media gallery ==
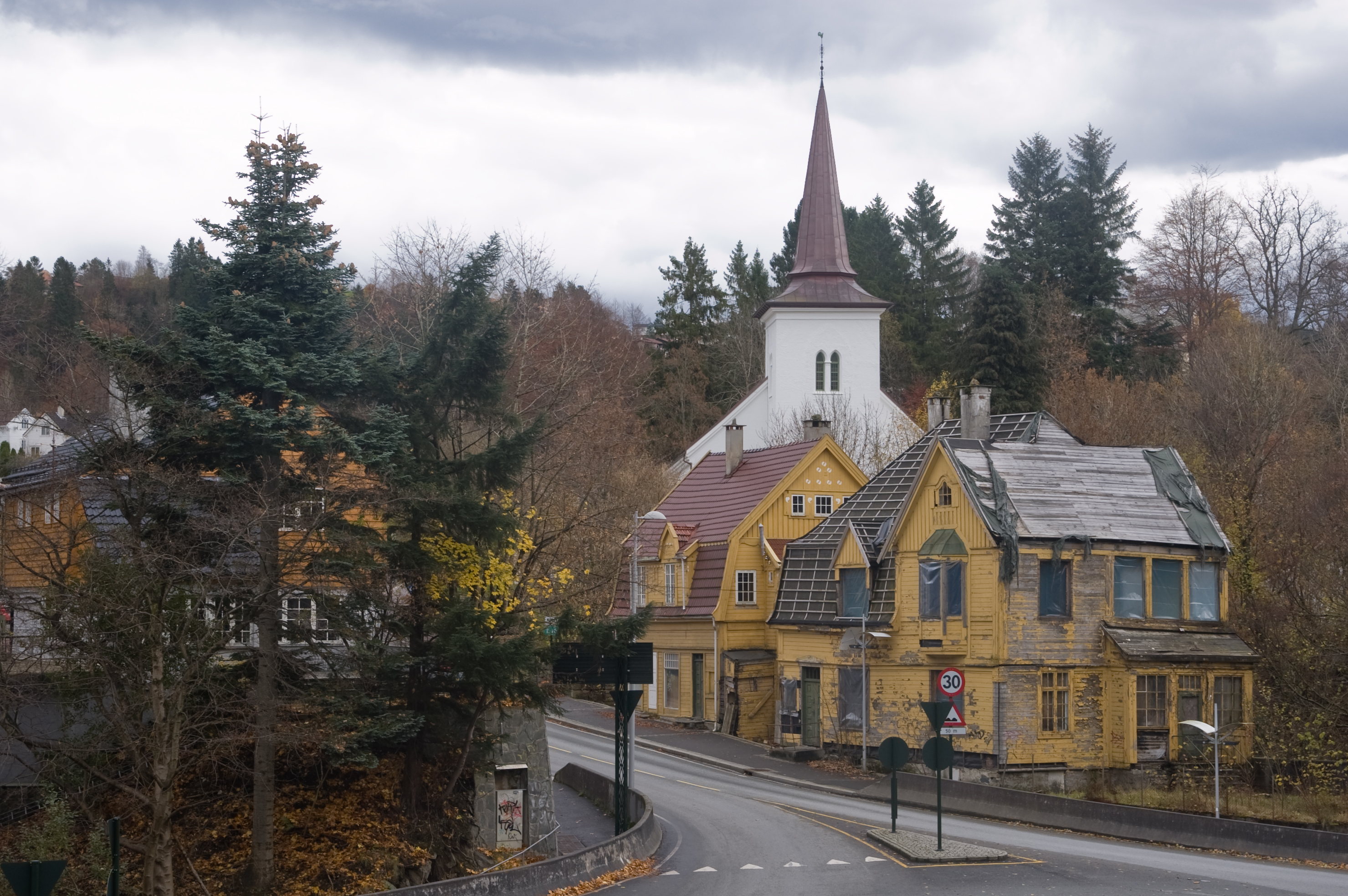
Church neighborhood

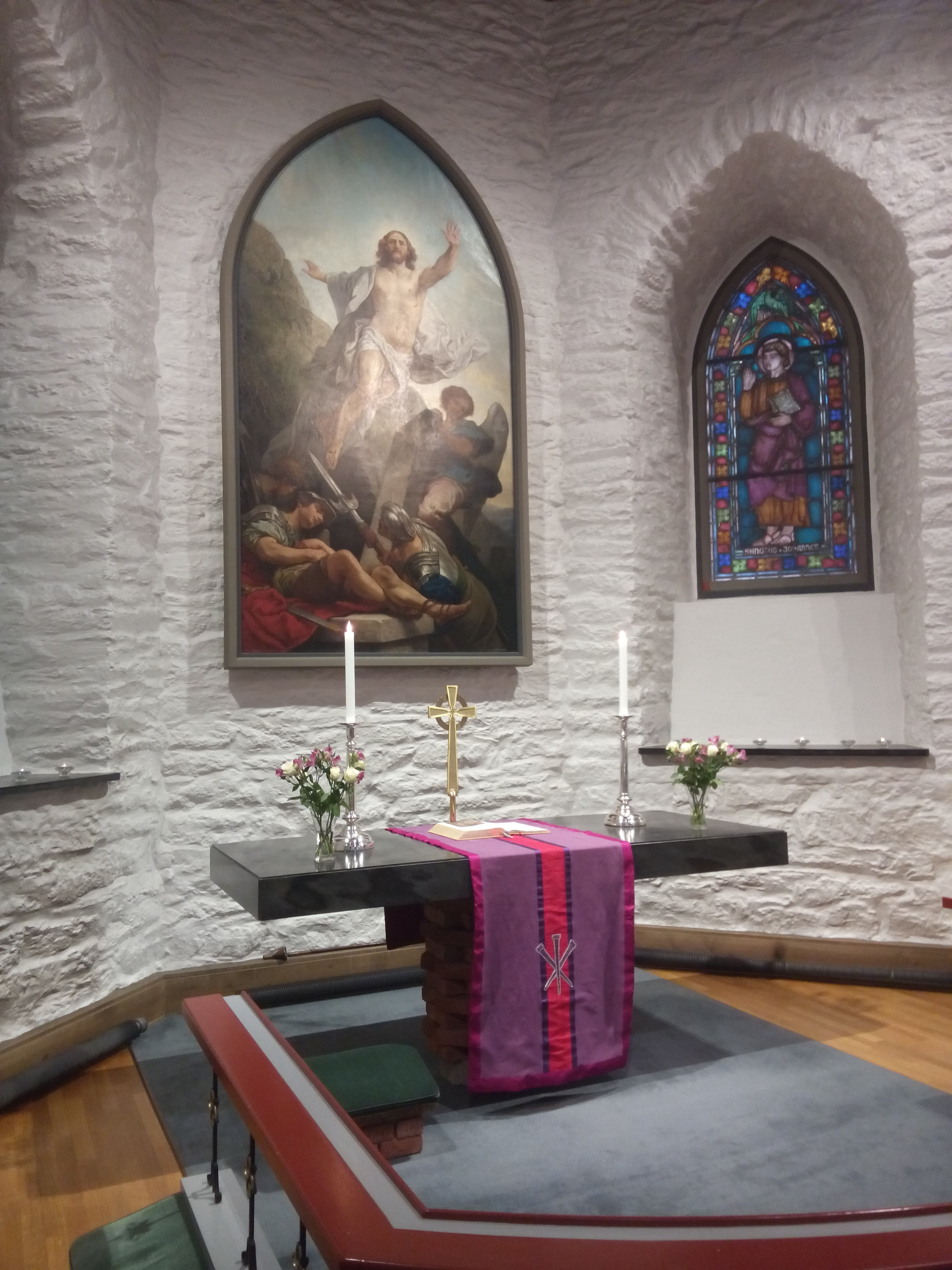
Altar

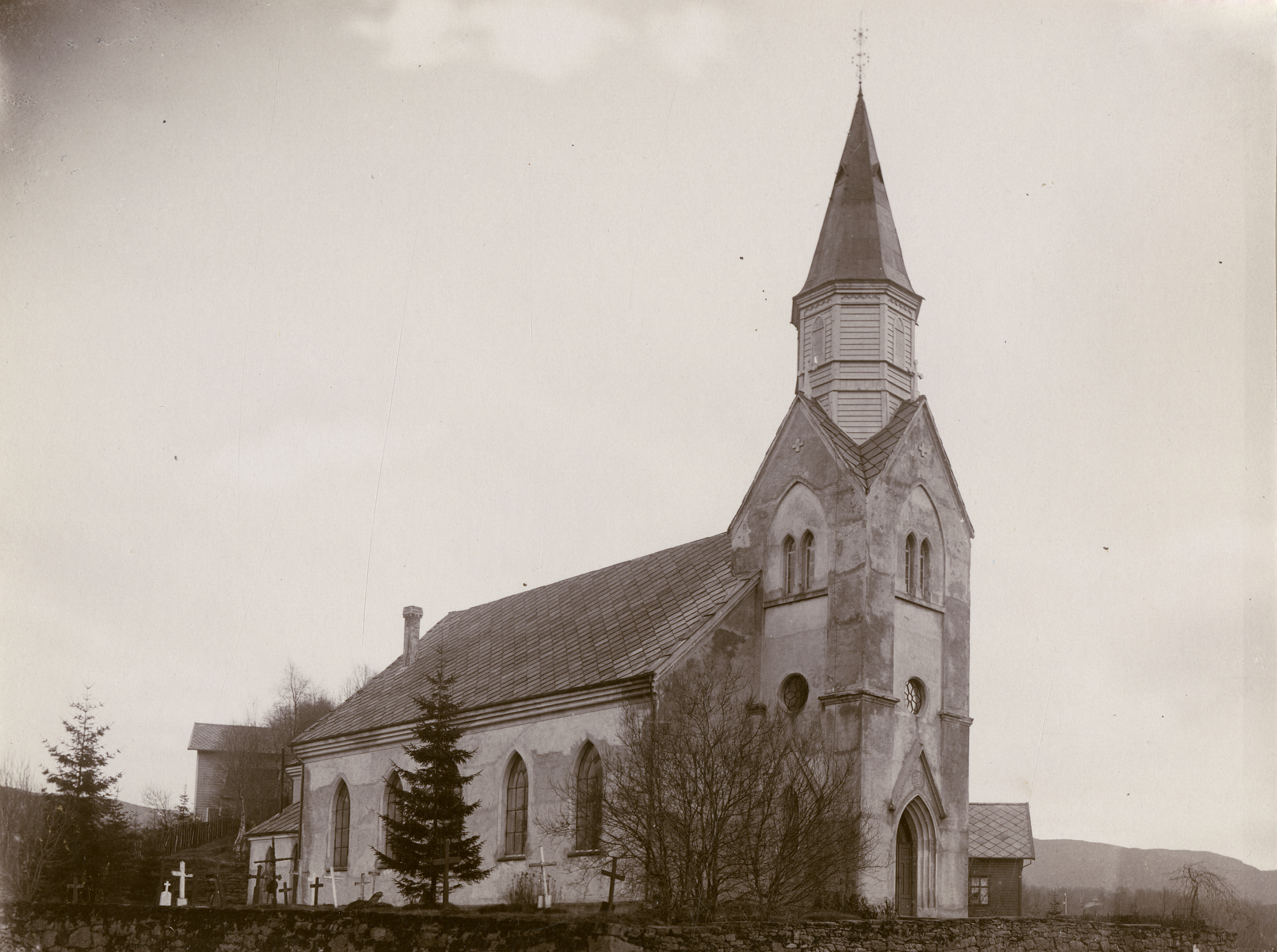
Church in 1836-1837

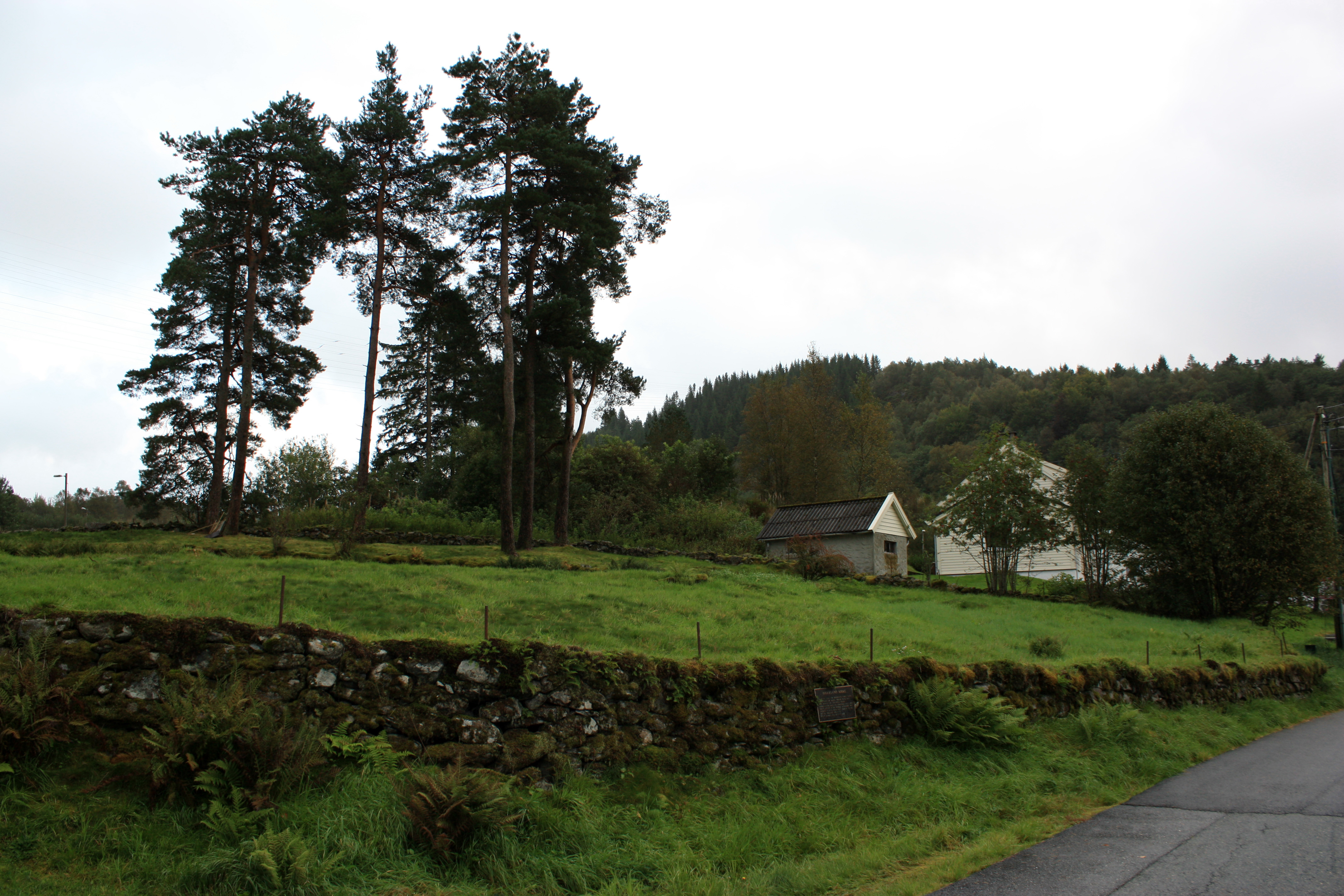
Site of the old medieval church

== See also ==
- List of churches in Bjørgvin
