= Årstad, Bergen =

Borough of Bergen, Norway

Årstad bydel
- Borough
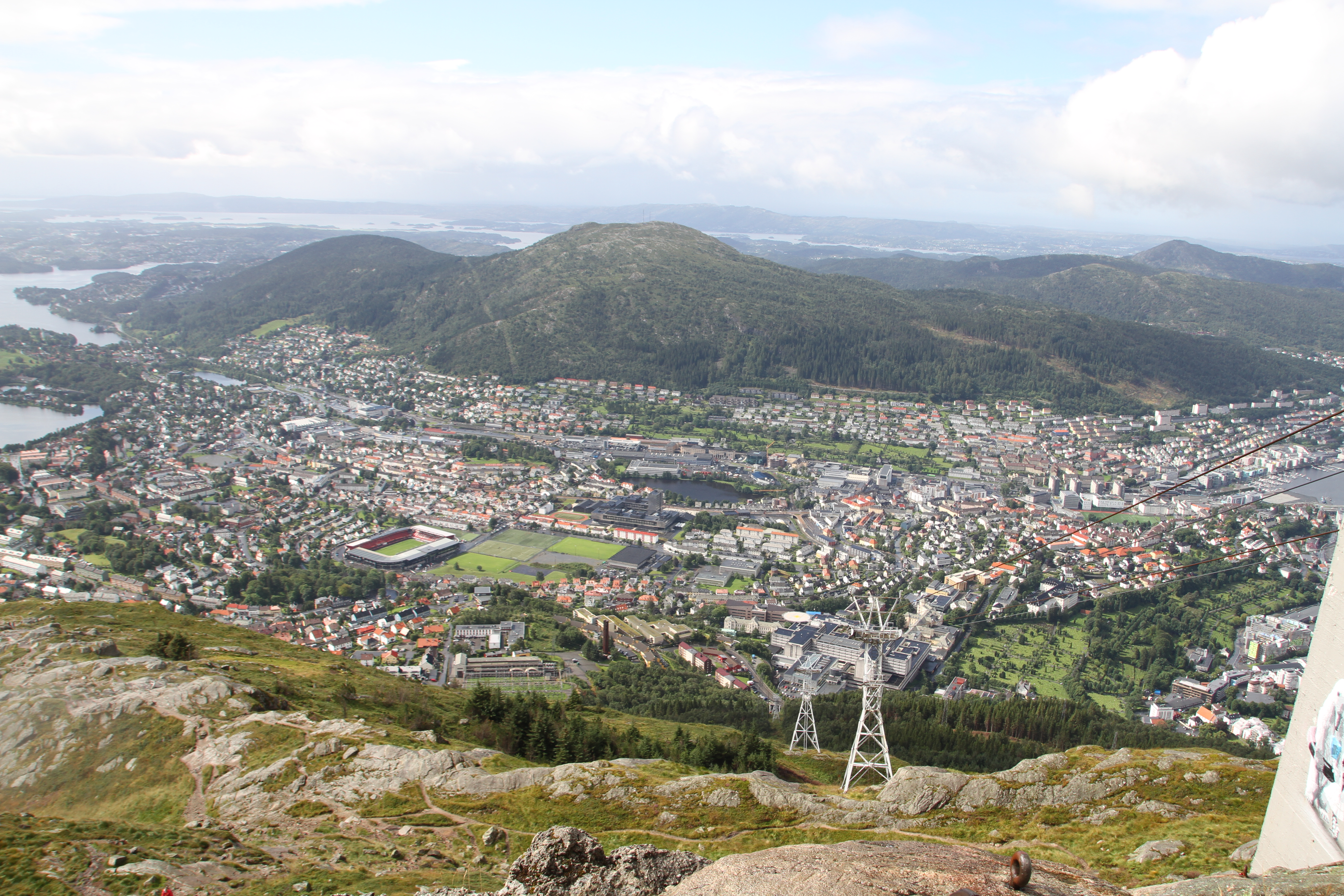

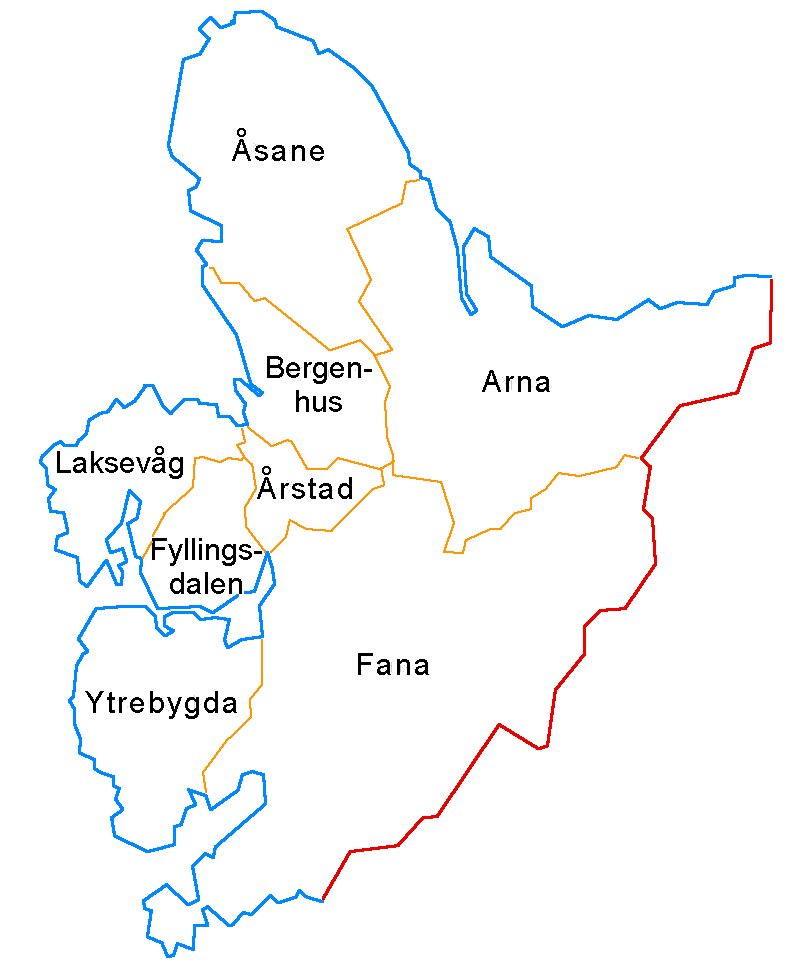
- Map of the 8 boroughs of the city of Bergen
- Coordinates: 60.362°N 5.356°E
- Country: Norway
- Region: Western Norway
- County: Vestland
- District: Midhordland
- City: Bergen

Area
  - Total: 14.11 km^{2} (5.45 sq mi)
  - Rank: 8th
- 3.2% of total

Population (2014)
  - Total: 39,906
  - Rank: 4th
  - Density: 2,828/km^{2} (7,325/sq mi)
- 14.7% of total
- Time zone: UTC+01:00 (CET)
  - Summer (DST): UTC+02:00 (CEST)
- ISO 3166 code: NO-120107

Årstad is a borough in the city of Bergen in Vestland county, Norway. Historically, the area was part of Aarstad Municipality until 1916, when it was merged into Bergen Municipality. The borough has similar (but not the same) boundaries to those of the old municipality.

The borough is located south of the city centre, and has a population of around 39,906 as of 1 January 2014. Årstad is home to Bergen's hospital, Haukeland University Hospital, as well as Norway's second largest vocational high school, Årstad videregående skole (the largest being Sandefjord videregående skole), and Brann Stadion, the stadium of the city's largest association football team, Brann.

== Name ==
"This whole area of the city was part of the king's property Ålrekstad (Årstad)", according to encyclopedia Store norske leksikon.

The municipality (originally the parish) was named after the old Årstad farm (Old Norse: Álreksstaðir), since the first Årstad Church was built there. The first element is probably the genitive of Álrekr, the old name of the mountain Ulriken. The last element is staðir meaning "farm".

== History ==
During the early Viking Ages, a king of Norway is believed to have had a Kongsgård estate at the foot of Ulriken called Álreksstaðir (Alrekstad). At times the farm was the home of, at least, King Harald Fairhair, his son, King Eric Bloodaxe, Bloodaxe's children, and King Haakon the Good (Haakon I). Later, the founder of Bergen, King Olav Kyrre (Olaf III), ruled the city from Alrekstad for 26 years. However, Alrekstad lost its importance when King Eystein I moved his seat to Holmen, located within the city limits. Around year 1300, the farm was handed over to the monastery of Nonneseter.

It is believed that the name Álreksstaðir is derived from Ulriken rather than the name Alrekr, the name Årstad being an abbreviation of the word Alrekstad. Another theory is that the farm was named after a king Alrek, who may or may not have existed, and who may have ruled over the petty kingdom of Hordariket around year 400. Today, the area where the farm was located (included in, but not limited to, the place now called Årstadvollen) is not a part of the borough of Årstad, but Bergenhus.

The 19th century was a period of heavy industrial development in Årstad Municipality, most significantly in the bay of Solheimsviken. At the end of the century, there were approximately 25 factories in the municipality, and it was the country's 4th largest in terms of industrial production output.

The parish of Aarstad was established as Aarstad Municipality on 1 January 1838 (see formannskapsdistrikt law). It remained a separate municipality until 1 July 1916, when it, as the second of six municipalities over the years, was merged into Bergen Municipality, increasing the area of Bergen municipality from 13.9 square kilometres (5.4 sq mi) to 34.9 square kilometres (13.5 sq mi). The merger happened after a long political process, following decades of close cooperation between the two municipalities - most of Årstad had been included in the Bergen Police District since 1808.

== Economy ==
The inhabitants of Årstad have the lowest average income of Bergen's boroughs, earning on average almost 70,000 kr (US$8149) less per annum than the inhabitants of the borough with the highest average income, Ytrebygda.

== Demographics ==
As of 1 January 2008, 7.4% of the population of Årstad was 0–5 years of age. 5.5% was in the age group 6–12 years, 2.5% between 13–15 years, 69.5% between 16–66 years, 8.1% between 67–79 years, and 7.0% were over 80 years of age. In total, 15.1% of the population were over 67 years of age, the Norwegian age of retirement, the highest amount in Bergen. In 2006, the mean gross income was 272,400 kr (approximately $ March 2008 USD). As of 1 January 2007, a total of 71.4% of the 6,589 couples living together were married. 43.5% were married without children, while the remaining 27.9% were married with children. 28.6% of the couples were not married; 15.9% were cohabitating couples without children while 12.7% were cohabitating with children.

== Education ==
Årstad contains five elementary schools, Fridalen skole, Kronstad skole, Landås skole, Minde skole, and Slettebakken skole, one lower secondary school, Gimle skole, one combined elementary and lower secondary school, Ny Krohnborg barne- og ungdomsskole, one special school, Alrekstad alternative skole, as well as two upper secondary schools, Årstad videregående skole and Langhaugen videregående skole. Årstad videregående skole is one of the largest upper secondary schools in Norway, with a total of 300 employees and 1400 students.

Over the last few years, there have been plans to shut down several schools in the borough. Kronstad skole was proposed for closure most recently in 2006. This proposal didn't go through, however, as the majority of the parties in the city council, as well as several parties in the opposition, voted against the school being shut down. Due to the school building being in poor condition, it was decided in 2004 that Fridalen skole was to be closed. However, following protests from the neighbourhood, the decision was retracted, at least temporarily. In 2008, the municipality released a report which predicts an increasing number of pupils in Årstad after many years of decline.

== Neighbourhoods ==
The list of neighborhoods in Årstad include Gyldenpris, Kronstad, Landås, Løvstakksiden, Minde (incl. Wergeland), Nattland, Solheim, Slettebakken

Årstad is the smallest borough in Bergen (by area), but also the second most densely populated. Most of the land in the borough was already built-up before the construction of the city's outer suburbs began in the middle of the 20th century. Årstad lacks traditional neighbourhood names as found in the city centre borough, Bergenhus, where these were established over several hundred years. Neighbourhood names are frequently named after the farm that owned the land before the area was urbanized.

Some parts of western Årstad, is however for example locally referred to as Løvstakksiden, which makes up one neighbourhood. Throughout the borough more such more or less informal neighbourhood names do also exist.

== Sports and culture ==
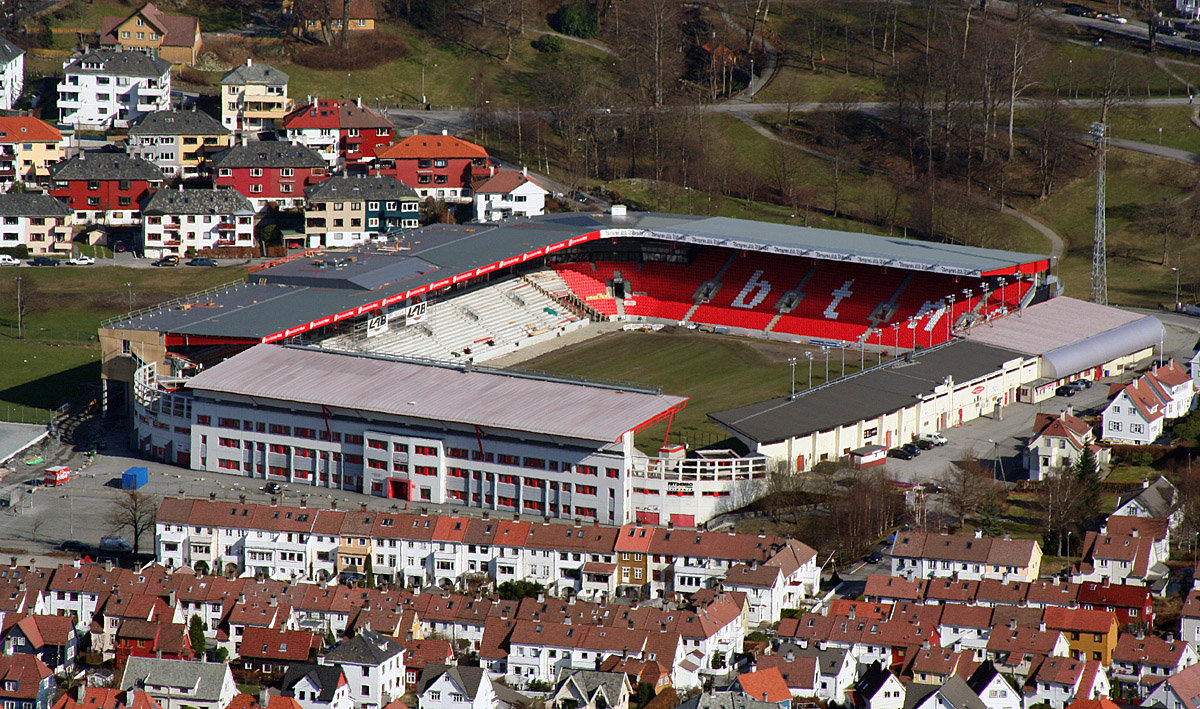
Brann stadion, home of the football club SK Brann.

Brann stadion, the stadium of Bergen's most successful football club SK Brann, was constructed in the late 1910s, and opened 25 May 1919, with a match between Brann and Norway's national team. As of June 2007, the stadium has a total seating capacity of 17,824.

Several other sport clubs have or have had their home in Årstad. The first was IL Nornen, founded in 1893 as a mountaineering, skiing, gymnastics and rowing club. Today, Nornen is mainly a gymnastics, handball and floorball club. Other sport clubs include the football club Nymark IL, Ny-Krohnborg IL, SK Baune. The main activity of most of the clubs is youth sports.

Although almost twenty buekorps have had their home in Årstad, only one, Løvstakkens Jægerkorps, still exists. As of 2000, Løvstakkens Jægerkorps is the only buekorps in the city to allow both girls and boys to join.

== Notable people ==
Notable people that were born or lived in Årstad include:

- Olaf Kronstad (1892–1939), actor
