= Alrekstad =

Historic site in Norway

Coordinates: 60°22′48″N 5°21′31″E

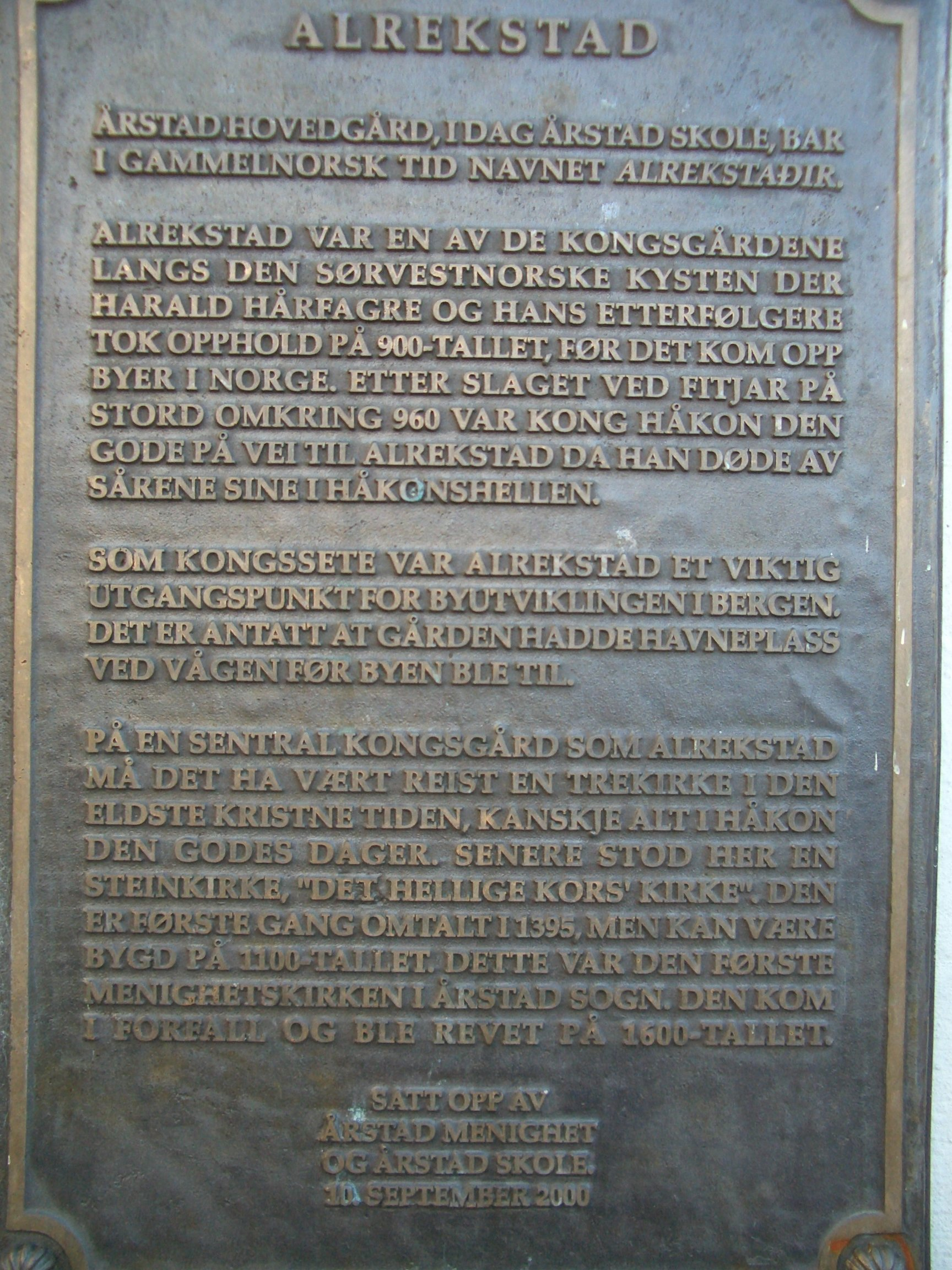
A plaque hanging on what is now Årstad Alternative School, with some of the history of Alrekstad.

Alrekstad (Norwegian: Kongsgården på Alrekstad; Old Norse: Álreksstaðir) was one of the largest Kongsgård estates on the west coast of Norway during the early Middle Ages.

== History ==
Alrekstad was situated at the foot of Ulriken, the highest of the Seven Mountains (Norwegian: de syv fjell) that surround Bergen, Norway. King Harald Fairhair took residence there in the 10th century. After the Battle of Fitjar in 960, King Haakon the Good was on his way to Alrek, but died at Håkonshella in Laksevåg.

The parish of Aarstad existed for centuries before the creation of the municipality of Aarstad Municipality in 1838. The municipality and parish of Aarstad (later spelled Årstad) was named after Alrekstad.

== Etymology ==
The name Alrekstad evolved into today's Årstad, the modern name of a borough of the city of Bergen. The location of Alrekstad – today referred to as "Årstadvollen" – is situated outside of the Årstad borough.

== Translation of the plaque ==
There is a historical plaque at Alrekstad that was installed in 2000 to mark the history of the site.

In old Norwegian times, Årstad main farm – now Årstad School – carried the name of Alrekstaðir.

Alrekstad was one of the king's farms along the southwestern Norwegian coast where Harald Fairhair and his followers stayed in the 900s before cities sprung up in Norway. After the Battle of Fitjar on Stord around 960, King Håkon the Good was on his way to Alrekstad when he died from his wounds at Håkonshellen.

As a seat of kings, Alrekstad was an important origin for the city development of Bergen. It is assumed that the farm had a harbour at Vågen before the city existed.

At a central king's farm such as Alrekstad, it is likely that there existed a wooden church in the earliest Christian period, maybe as early as in the days of Håkon the Good. Later, here stood a stone church, "The Church of The Holy Cross". It is spoken of for the first time 1395, but could have been built in the 12th century. This was the first congregation church in Årstad parish. It later decayed, and was torn down in the 16th century.

— Put up by Årstad congregation and Årstad School. September 10, 2000

== Other sources ==
- Bing, Just Aarstads historie (Bergens Historiske Forenings Skrifter. November 28, 1922)
