= Husby (estate) =

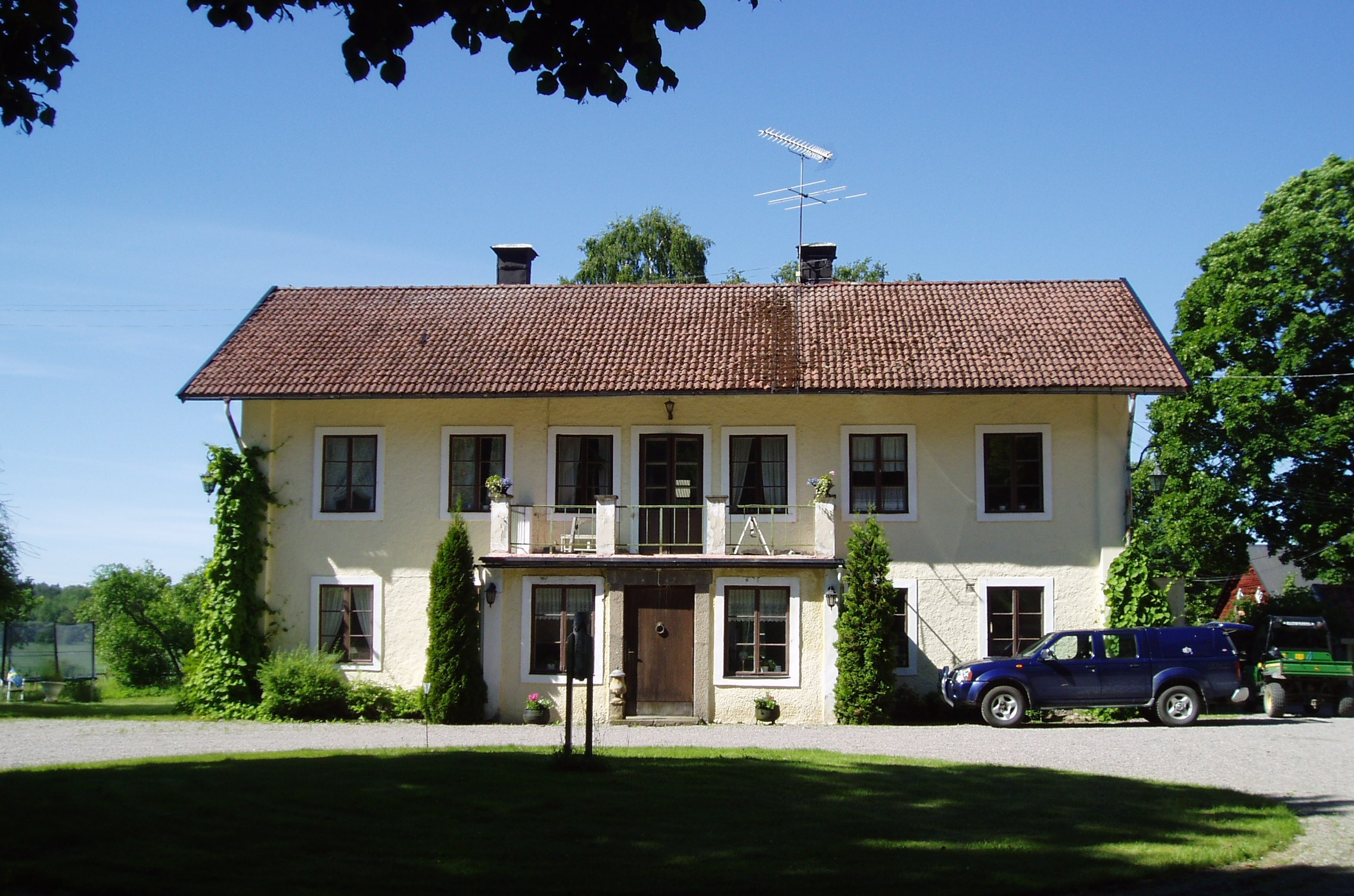
Husby farm, main building, Ekerö municipality, Sweden

Husby is the name of many present-day Swedish (and other Scandinavian) farms and villages.

Originally, they formed a network of royal estates, called Uppsala öd, that were the property of the Swedish king. There were about 70 husbys and they are most common in eastern Svealand, of which 25 are found in Uppland. There were a few outside this area, such as Husaby in Västergötland.

A Husby consisted of a big and centrally located farm, and they may have originally been the property of local strongmen who were defeated by the Swedish kings. During the 13th century a more efficient administration rendered them obsolete.
