= Minde, Bergen =

Neighbourhood of Bergen, Norway

Coordinates: 60.3590°N 5.3441°E

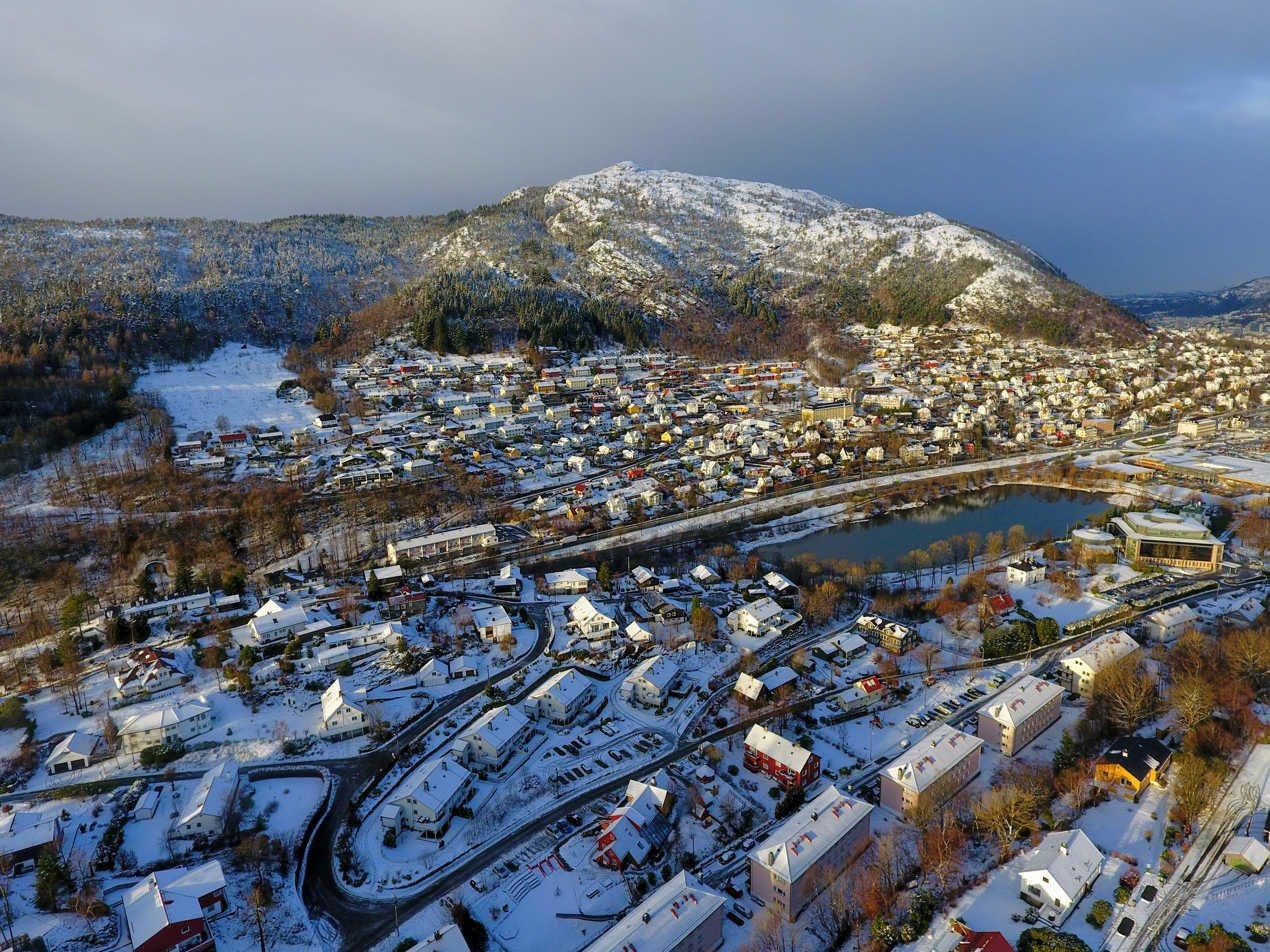
Minde and mount Løvstakken viewed from Storetveit. Credit: Magnus Aasen Aukland

Minde is a neighbourhood in the southwestern part of Årstad borough in the city of Bergen in Vestland county, Norway. It is located south of the neighborhoods of Solheim and Kronstad, west of Landås, and north of Fjøsanger and Storetveit (in Fana borough). Parts of Minde were in Fana Municipality before the merger of 1972. It is home to the headquarters of the shipping company Odfjell. The area is served by one elementary school, Minde skole. An upper secondary school, Kristianborg videregående skole, was formerly located here, operated jointly by three free churches. As it failed to attain a body of students large enough for the operation of the school to be economically viable, it closed after the end of the school year of 2007/2008. Fridalen Church is located in the neighborhood too.

== Transport ==
The main highway to the city centre of Bergen, European route E39, passes through Minde and it is called the Fjøsangerveien. The four-lane dual carriageway passes through densely populated areas without grade separation and there are plans for a 2.7-kilometre (1.7 mi) long tunnel bypass between Danmarksplass and Fjøsanger. The project was not included in the National Transport Plan for the period 2010–2019. The first stage of the Bergen Light Rail system, which opened in June 2010, includes a station at Wergeland in Minde.
