= Kronstad, Bergen =

Neighbourhood of Bergen, Norway

Coordinates: 60.3737°N 5.3469°E

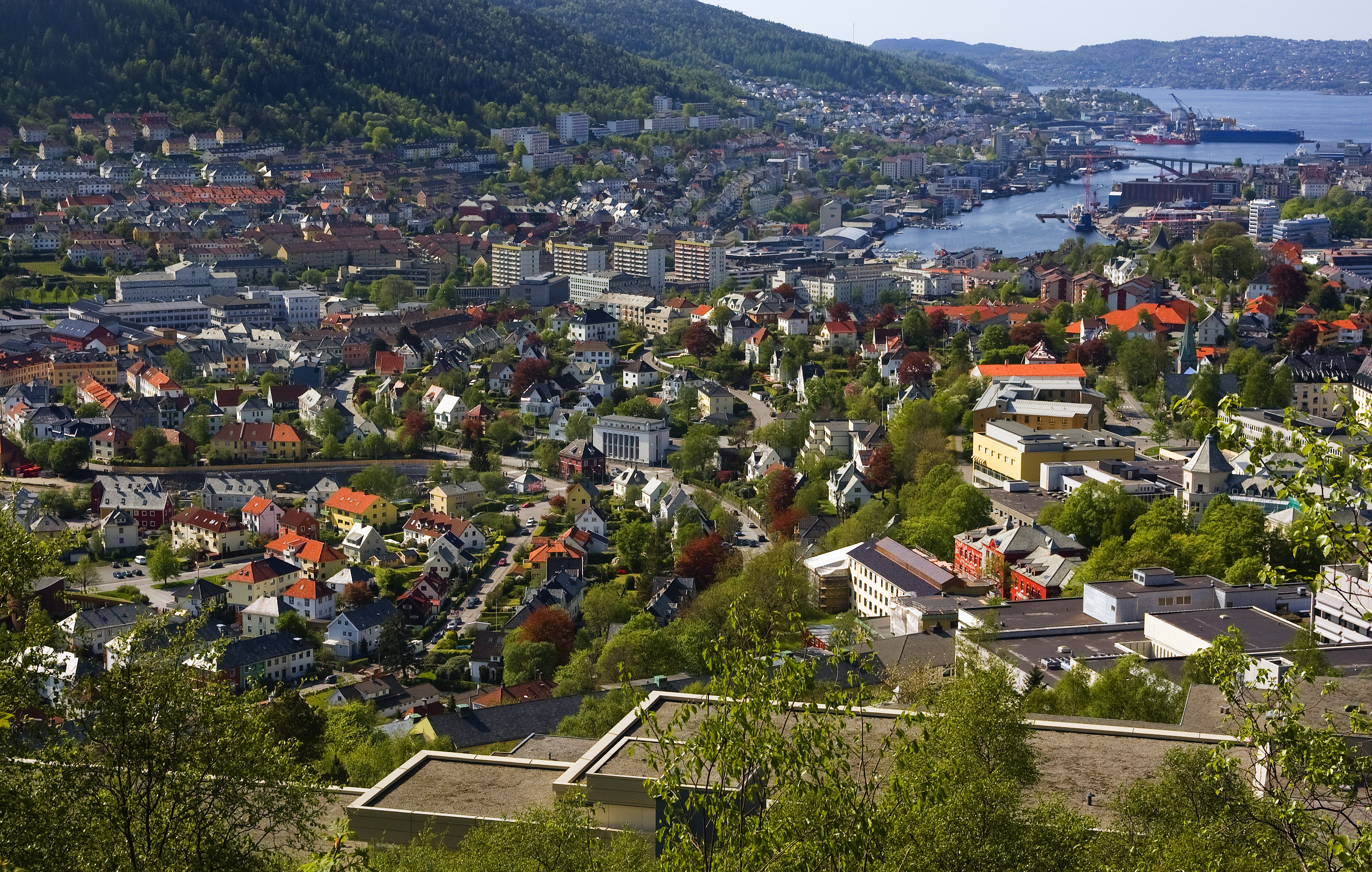
North-eastern Kronstad (foreground)

Kronstad is a neighbourhood in the borough of Årstad in the city of Bergen in Vestland county, Norway. It is located in the northern part of the borough, south of the large Store Lungegårdsvannet bay, east of the neighborhood of Solheim, north of Minde, west of Landås, and west of Møllendal and Haukeland (in Bergenhus borough). The neighbourhood was named after the old Kronstad farm (whose successor is the Kronstad Hovedgård manor house), which was formerly known as "Hunstad". After the vicar of Bergen Cathedral purchased the farm in 1705, the name was changed to "Cronstad" which later changed to Kronstad.

== Buildings ==
Architect Ole Landmark designed several buildings in the area, where a street has been named him. One of his main works is the former cinema Forum Kino, a functionalist building from 1946 (the construction was initiated in 1936). The municipality sold the building in 2006, and it is no longer used as a cinema. In 2007, it was resold to the Christian television channel Visjon Norge, and it has since been used for a number of purposes, including revival meetings and theatre performances. Other buildings by Landmark include "Clementsgaard", now the headquarters of Henschien Insurance, and a villa inspired by the Rococo and Empire styles.

The former manor house Kronstad Hovedgård was built in the late 18th century. It was sold to consul Joachim Friele in 1840, who hired architect Ole Peter Riis Høegh to reconstruct the building. The expanded and altered building was inspired by the French Château Margaux and the Empire style.

The area has several churches. Årstad Church, a stone church from 1890, is one of Årstad borough's six Church of Norway churches, and is located adjacent to the border with Bergenhus borough. The Seventh-day Adventist Church Adventkirken i Bergen is located far northeastern in Kronstad, just north of the road Danmarksplass. The oldest of the free churches in the area is Bergen Frikirke, established in 1899, which formerly used a church building on the road Bjørnsons gate. That building is now used by Evangeliekirken, a Pentecostal church, while Bergen Frikirke uses a modern church building further south-west.

=== Bergen University College ===
The three faculties of the Bergen University College are mostly co-located in a new campus built on the site of the old NSB depot in southern Kronstad, next to Kronstad station of the "bybanen" Bergen Light Rail system. Many of the old depot buildings are integrated into the new campus, which is designed by the architect firms HLM Arkitektur og Plan and CUBO Arkitekter. The project was allotted funding in the government budget of 2008 for what would become one of the largest and most high-profile construction projects in the country, entailing relocation of around 1000 state employees. Construction began in 2010, and was completed in 2015.

== Transport ==
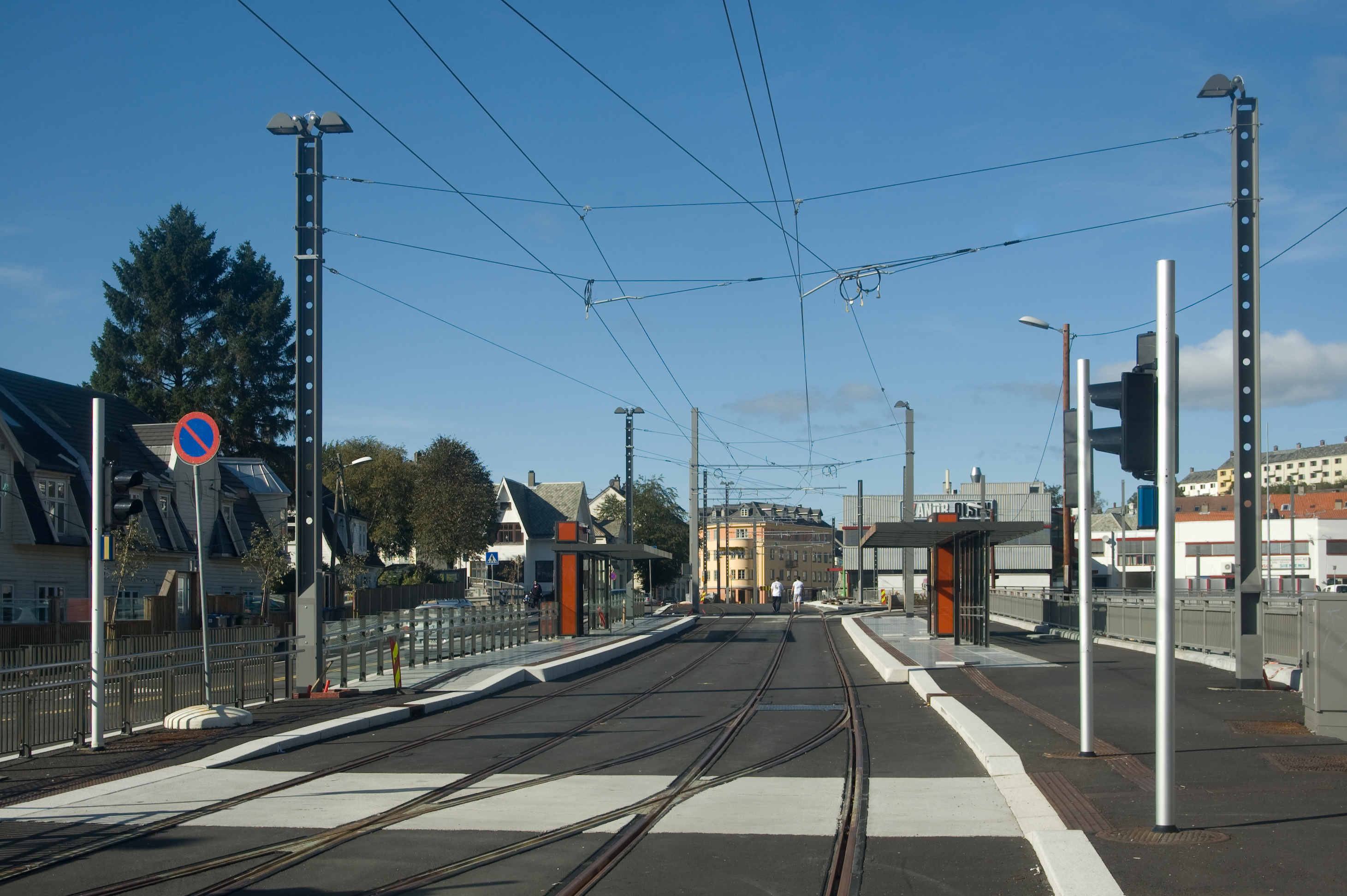
Kronstad station of the Bergen Light Rail system

Stage 1 of the Bergen Light Rail line will pass through Kronstad, and one of the 15 stations of the initial stage will be located just south of the Bjørnsons gate/Inndalsveien intersection. It will be the seventh station from the northern (city centre) terminus and the ninth station from the southern terminus at Nesttun. The rolling stock depot of the first stage will be located directly northeast of the station, adjacent to the (now mostly unused) railway line that, prior to the Ulriken Tunnel's opening in 1964, served the Bergen Line.

The primary thoroughfare in the area is Ibsens gate (Fv 255), which runs from Haukelandsveien, just south of Haukeland University Hospital, to Danmarksplass, and has an annual average daily traffic of 10,000-11,000 vehicles. Bjørnsons gate runs from Fjøsangerveien, south of Danmarksplass, to Ibsens gate. The western part of the road is part of Norwegian national road 582, which continues southwards to Minde as Inndalsveien. The construction of the Bergen Light Rail system brought with itself many changes to the local road system. Several roads were temporarily closed during part of the construction period, among them Ibsens gate, the main road to Haukeland University Hospital. Bjørnsons gate was converted into an eastwards one-way road between Fjøsangerveien and Inndalsveien. Inndalsveien was improved and widened to make room for the Bergen Light Rail trackage. Jonas Lies vei, formerly a busy thoroughfare between Danmarksplass and the hospital, was closed at its western end.

== See also ==
- Kronstad Station
