= Kronstad =

Kronstad may refer to:

== Places ==
- Kronstadt, a Russian town and seaport
- Kronstad, Bergen, a neighbourhood in Bergen, Norway
- Kronstad Hovedgård, a Norwegian manor house
- Kroonstad, a South African city

== Other ==
- Kronstadt rebellion, anti-Bolshevik rebellion
