= Stord/Haugesund University College =

Educational institution in Norway

Coordinates: 59°24′33″N 5°16′35″E

- Høgskulen På Vestlandet
- Type: State College
- Established: 1994
- Rector: Gunnar Yttri
- Administrative staff: 260
- Students: 2700
- Location: Haugesund, Stord,, Norway
- Campus: Haugesund, Stord
- Website: https://hvl.no

Stord/Haugesund University College (HSH), Norwegian: Høgskolen Stord/Haugesund) was a medium sized state university college in Norway before it was merged with Bergen University College and Sogn og Fjordane University College to become HVL. The university college offered bachelor's and master's degrees in various fields (including information and communication technology, safety management, health sciences, and marine studies) and courses for professionals. The university college also had several PhD students working in various disciplines. The institution did not have the power to award doctoral degrees which must be awarded by an external institution.

The university college was established in 1994 when the Norwegian college system was restructured and Haugesund Sjukepleierhøgskole (Haugesund Nursing College), Stord Lærarhøgskule (Stord Teachers College) and Stord Sjukepleiarhøgskule (Stord Nursing College) merged. As a result, there were campuses both in Haugesund and Stord which both have now merged into HVL. The largest campus was located in Haugesund however as the administration is based in Stord, the Stord campus appears first in the name of the institution. Now the largest campus is located in Bergen.

While HSH was formed fairly recently, the history of the founding institutions dates back to 1839 when teachers were educated on Stord. HSH in Haugesund dates back to 1985 when maritime education was offered. The development of HSH continues. Since 2008, HSH has been a partner in UH-nett Vest (Universitets- og høgskolenettet på Vestlandet). This organisation attempts to foster greater cooperation between the participating institutions.

As well as teaching, HSH also has a significant research output. In 2008, HSH recorded 53 publication points, a 49% increase on 2007.

== Alumni ==
- Christian Grindheim – football player
- Jan Kjell Larsen – football player
- Agnes Ravatn – award winning novelist, columnist and journalist
- Magne Rommetveit – Member of Parliament
- Håvard Tvedten – team handball player
