= Sigurd Fasting =

Norwegian philologist (1921–1982)

Sigurd Fasting (12 May 1921 – 11 March 1982) was a Norwegian philologist specializing in Russian studies.

He was born in Kristiania, but grew up in Hønefoss. After finishing his secondary education there in 1940, he enrolled at the University of Oslo.

He finally took the cand.philol. degree in 1949 and was hired at the University Library of Bergen in 1950. Contributing to the foundation of the Institute of Russian Studies, he also took the dr.philos. degree in 1970 with the thesis about Vissarion Belinsky; V. G. Belinskij. Die Entwicklung seiner Literaturtheorie. I. Die Wirklichkeit ein Ideal. From 1970 to his death he was a professor at the University of Bergen. He was also vice dean of the Faculty of Humanities from 1974 to 1976, member of the interim board at the University of Tromsø, and a fellow of the Norwegian Academy of Science and Letters.

Fasting resided at Paradis. He was hit by a bus in downtown Bergen in March 1982 and died at Haukeland Hospital.
