= Landås Church =

Church in Vestland, Norway

- Landås kirke
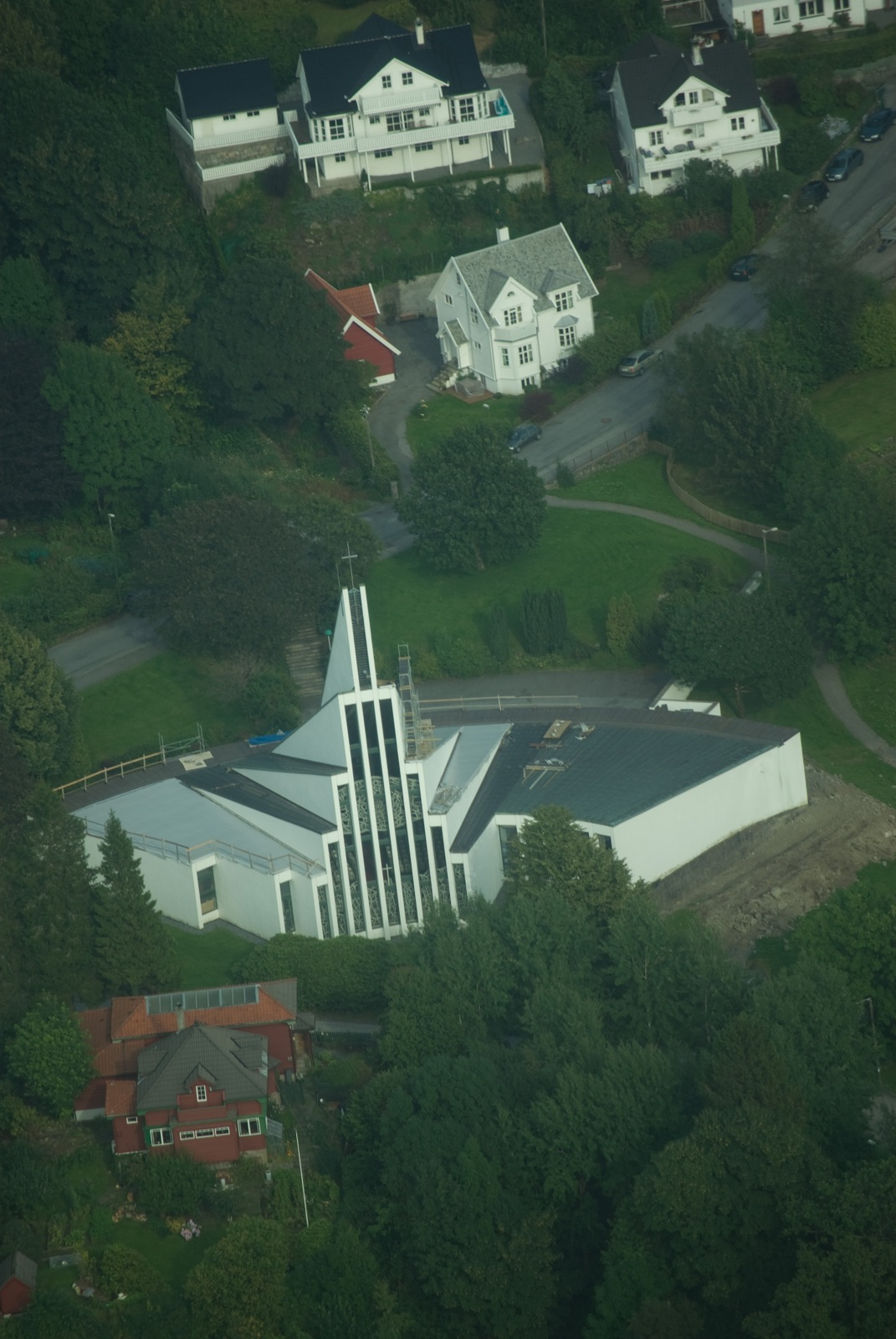
- View of the church
- Landås Church
- 60°21′52″N 5°22′19″E
- Location: Bergen, Vestland
- Country: Norway
- Denomination: Church of Norway
- Churchmanship: Evangelical Lutheran

History
- Status: Parish church
- Founded: 1966
- Consecrated: 27 Nov 1966

Architecture
- Functional status: Active
- Architect: Ola Kielland-Lund
- Architectural type: Fan-shaped
- Completed: 1966 (60 years ago)

Specifications
- Capacity: 600
- Materials: Concrete

Administration
- Diocese: Bjørgvin bispedømme
- Deanery: Bergensdalen prosti
- Parish: Landås
- Norwegian Cultural Heritage Site
- Type: Church
- Status: Protected
- ID: 84893

Landås Church (Norwegian: Landås kyrkje) is a parish church of the Church of Norway in Bergen Municipality in Vestland county, Norway. It is located in the Landås neighborhood in the Årstad borough of the city of Bergen. It is the church for the Landås parish which is part of the Bergensdalen prosti (deanery) in the Diocese of Bjørgvin. The white, concrete church was built in a fan-shaped design with a very modern style in 1966 using plans drawn up by the architect Ola Kielland-Lund. The church seats about 600 people.

== History ==
The new parish of Landås was established in 1959 when it was separated from the Fridalen Church parish. Planning began soon after for a church for the new parish. An architectural competition was held in 1961 to determine the designer of the new building. It was won by Ola Kielland-Lund. Construction on the church took place from 1964-1966. It was consecrated on 26 November 1966. The church is notable for its unique roof line. It is made up of several curved sections of differing heights, giving a cascade-like appearance.

== See also ==
- List of churches in Bjørgvin
