= Nattland =

Coordinates: 60.3457°N 5.3639°E

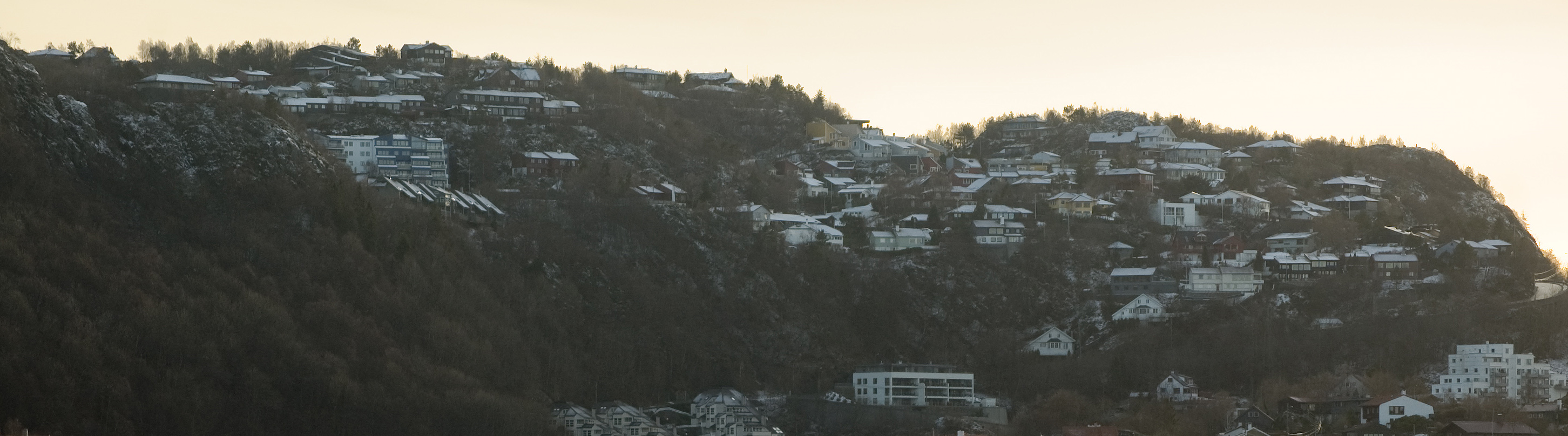
Nattlandsfjellet

Nattland (also written "Natland") is a neighbourhood in Årstad and Fana boroughs in the city of Bergen in Vestland county, Norway. It is located south of Landås and northeast of Paradis, although, like every neighbourhood outside Bergenhus borough, it has no clearly defined borders. It includes the residential areas that are located west and east of Nattlandsveien and Birkelundsbakken, and atop Nattlandsfjellet, a hill that is part of the Ulriken mountain massif; its summit is at 245 metres (804 ft) above sea level. The basic statistical units of Nattlandsfjellet, Øvre Nattland, and Nedre Nattland had a combined population of 3121 as of 1 January 2009. Nattland is the location of Nattland Studentboliger, a major student housing complex for students with children.
