= Fridalen =

Neighborhood in Bergen, Norway

Coordinates: 60°21′51″N 5°21′26″E

Fridalen is a neighborhood in the borough of Årstad in the city of Bergen in Vestland county, Norway. The neighborhood lies at the foot of mount Ulriken, between the neighborhoods of Haukeland and Landås. The main attractions in Fridalen include Brann Stadion and Fridalen Church.
