= Olav Hoprekstad =

Norwegian educator, playwright, theatre critic and literary critic

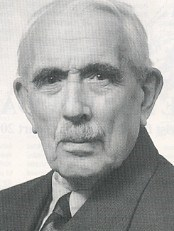
- Born: 4 April 1875; Vik i Sogn, Norway
- Died: 16 August 1965 (aged 90); Bergen
- Occupation(s): Educator; Writer

Olav Ragnvaldsson Hoprekstad (4 April 1875 – 16 August 1965) was a Norwegian educator, playwright, theatre critic and literary critic.

== Personal life ==
Hoprekstad was born in Vik, Nordre Bergenhus as the son of farmer Ragnvald Olsen Hopperstad and Ragnhild Eriksdotter Hønsi. He was married to Signe Valebjørg from 1902. He died in Bergen in August 1965.

== Career ==
Hoprekstad graduated from the teachers' college in Hamar in 1895. He worked as a teacher in Bergen from 1899. From 1927 he was headmaster at the primary school at Møhlenpris in Bergen, and later at the Fridalen primary school. He was a theatre critic and literary critic for the newspaper Bergens Tidende from 1913 to 1940, and for Gula Tidend from 1949 to 1965.

His play Bjørnefjell, written in 1907, was among the opening repertoire at Det Norske Teatret in 1913. His play Friarar was staged later in 1913, Eli Sjo in 1916, Bjørgedal in 1919, Straumen in 1922, Trollebotn in 1925, Veslelorden in 1931, and Berstein på Strondi in 1940. His plays have also been staged at Den Nationale Scene and at the Comedy theatre in Bergen. He was a board member of the teachers' union Norges Lærerlag from 1917 to 1946. During the Occupation of Norway by Nazi Germany he was involved in the teachers' development of a strong attitude against nazification of schools. In 1946 he published the book Frå lærarstriden, with events from the war period. He wrote books about the history of education in Bergen, and was principal editor of the three volumes Bygdabok for Vik i Sogn. He was a proponent for Nynorsk language, and a board member of the society Noregs Mållag for many years. He was a board member of Det Norske Teatret from 1948 to 1963. He was decorated Knight, First Class of the Royal Norwegian Order of St. Olav in 1963.

Hoprekstad died in Bergen on 16 August 1965.

== Selected works ==
- Bjørnefjell (play, 1907)
- Frå lærarstriden (1946)
