= Ambrosia Tønnesen =

Norwegian sculptor (1859–1948)

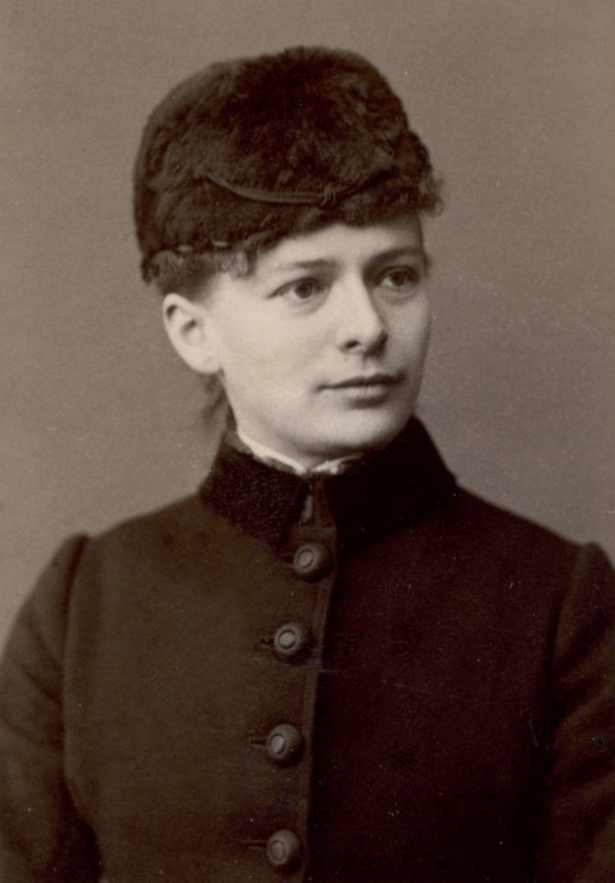
- Born: Ambrosia Theodora Tønnesen; 28 January 1859; Ålesund, United Kingdoms of Sweden and Norway
- Died: 21 January 1948 (aged 88); Fana, Norway
- Occupation: Sculptor
- Awards: Officier d'Académie

Ambrosia Tønnesen (28 January 1859 – 21 January 1948) was a Norwegian sculptor. She is regarded as the first professional female sculptor in Norway, and is best known for her many portraits, including statues, busts, and reliefs.

== Personal life and education ==
Tønnesen was born in Ålesund, a daughter of steamshipmaster Abraham Tønnesen (1818–1868) and Thomine Jonasen. She worked as a schoolteacher in Bergen for some years, while also studying drawing, modeling, and painting. In 1885 she travelled to Copenhagen where she studied with painter Bertha Wegmann and sculptor Stephan Sinding. She then studied with sculptor Albert Wolff in Berlin, and further with René de Saint-Marceaux in Paris. Ambrosia met her partner, Mary Banks, in 1888 and the two women lived together for 30 years in Paris, and Bergen, Norway.

== Career ==
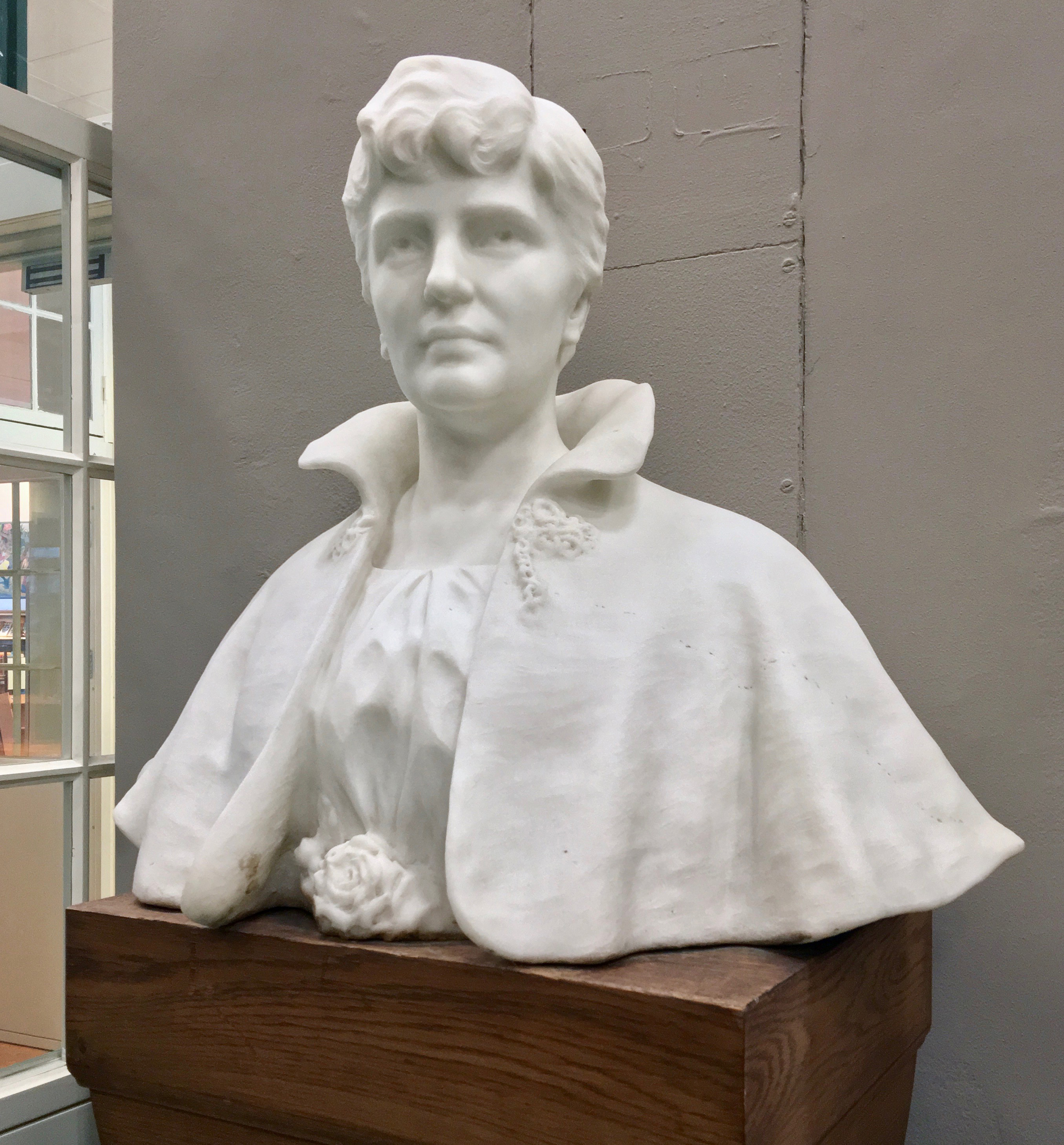
Tønnesen's marble bust of Amalie Skram, on display at the Bergen Public Library

Among Tønnesen's early sculptures are Våren (1885), Sneklokken (1887; a young girl), Den onde Hjørdis (1890), and Den korsfestede Kristus ("The Crucified Christ"; marble sculpture in Årstad Church, 1890). She made a large number of portraits (statues, busts, and reliefs), and is regarded as the first female Norwegian sculptor who made her living from her art. Her portraits include statues of Ole Bull, Johan Christian Dahl, and Camilla Collett; reliefs of Dorothe Engelbretsdatter and Petter Dass; and busts of Edvard Grieg (marble, 1902), Ole Irgens (bronze, 1906), Amalie Skram (marble, 1916, at Bergen Kunstmuseum), Gina Krog (bronze, 1919), Claus Fasting, bronze, 1924), Christian Michelsen (bronze, 1924), Henrik Angell (bronze, 1924), Wollert Konow (bronze, 1925), and Haakon Wallem (bronze, 1942).

Tønnesen was decorated with the French order Officier d'Académie.

== Death ==
She died in Fana (now Bergen) on 21 January 1948, aged 88.

== Literature ==
- Wikborg, Tone (1982). "Med hammer og meisel – Ambrosia Tønnesen. Norges første profesjonelle billedhugger". In Vogt, K. (ed.). Den skjulte tradisjon – skapende kvinner i kulturhistorien. Bergen. pp. 161–171.
- Jorunn Veiteberg (2009) Ambrosia Tønnesen. Stenhugger i det Fine
