= Karoline Larm =

Norwegian singer-songwriter (born 1994)

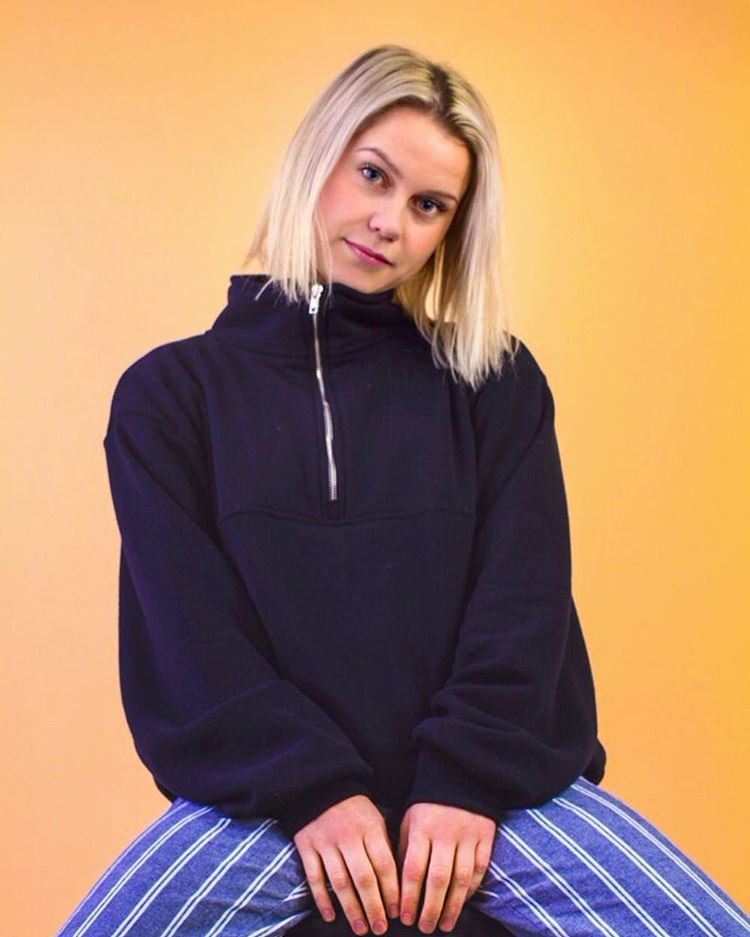

Background information
- Born: March 29, 1994 (age 32); Fana
- Origin: Bergen, Norway
- Occupation: Singer-songwriter
- Instruments: Vocals, guitar
- Years active: 2010–present

Karoline Larm (born March 29, 1994) is a Norwegian singer-songwriter.

== Early life ==
Raised in Fana, Karoline learned guitar and singing as a child. She attended Ytrebygda Junior High School, where she made her first appearance in front of an audience of 700 people, before studying at Langhaugen Upper Secondary School in Bergen.

== Career ==
On 17 May 2010, Larm was supervising her music teacher's concert on the pub scene Sjøboden at Bryggen in Bergen, after which she was invited to play on stage afterwards, which resulted in a steady job at the bar.

She was a musical feature at Sjøboden from 2010 to 2014.

In 2015, Larm competed in the reality television singing competition The Voice Norway. Her appearance on The Voice brought her to the attention of P&L Records, who signed her in 2018.

Her first recording was "If You Leave" in 2016.
