= Claus Fasting =

Norwegian writer (1746–1791)

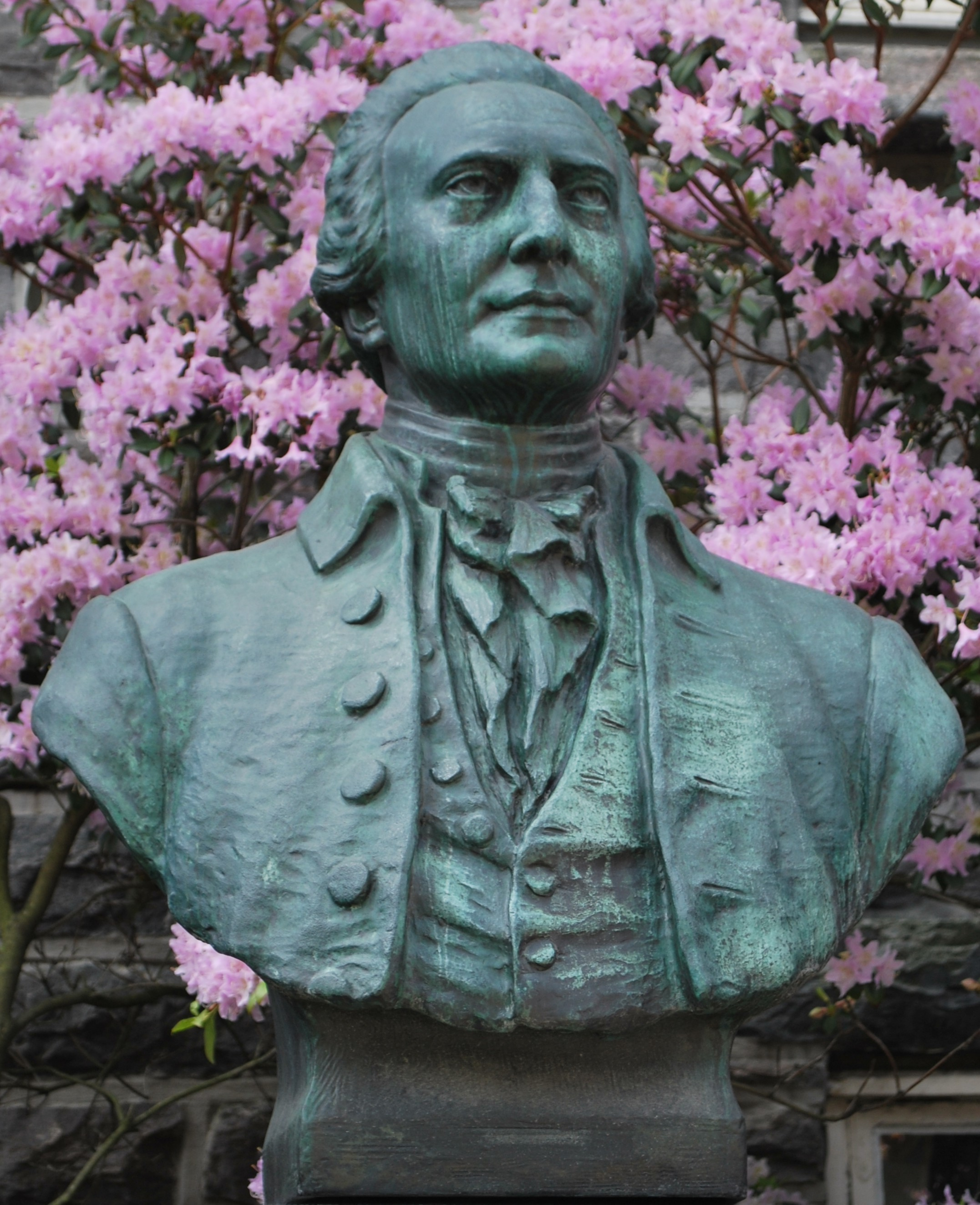
Bust of Claus Fasting

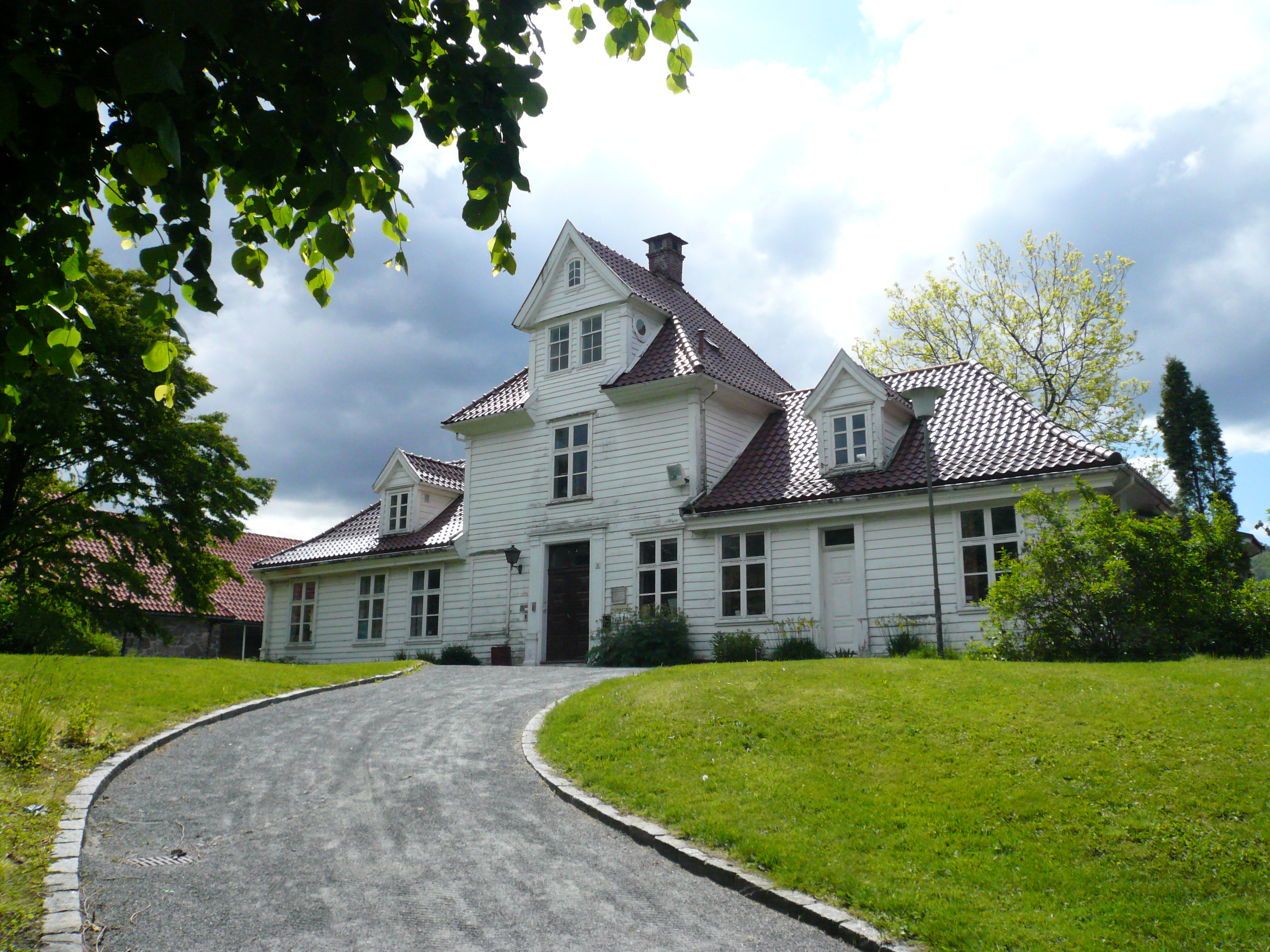
Fastings Minde in Bergen

Claus Fasting (29 October 1746 – 25 December 1791) was a Norwegian playwright, literary critic, editor and civil servant. Among his literary works were the song Harmonisang (1769) and his journals Provinzialsamlinger (1791).

== Biography ==
Claus Frederik Fasting was born in Bergen, Norway. He was the only child of Fredrik Fasting (1718-69) who was vicar at Nykirken and his wife, Gerhardina von Güllich (1715-70). He studied at the University of Copenhagen where he received his philosophical and theological degree in 1766. In 1768 he returned to Bergen, where his father died the following year. In 1770, his mother died and he returned to Copenhagen.

In 1772, he co-founded The Norwegian Society (Norske Selskab), a literary society for Norwegian students in Copenhagen. He published the prize-winning play Hermine in 1772, a metrical tragedy and in 1773 he delivered the play as a participant in a competition announced by the Royal Danish Theatre. From 1773, he was co-editor of Kritisk Journal and from 1775-76 Kritisk Tilskuer delivering critical reviews to both magazines.

In 1777, Fasting traveled home to Bergen, where he lived the rest of his life. During the years 1778-1781, he published a literary magazine called Provinzialblade. In 1783, he became an alderman and from 1787 he served as city manager in Bergen. He died in Bergen during 1791. His personal collection of books were first used as a local lending library. In 1826, by royal decree the book collection was transferred to Bergen Cathedral School. Today these volumes are preserved at the Library of the University of Bergen. Today a bust of Fasting, made by Ambrosia Tønnesen in 1924, stands outside Bergen Public Library.

== Fasting Minde ==
Towards the end of the 1780s, Claus Fasting developed a manor house. It was situated in the neighborhood of Møhlenpris on land previously developed by his great-grandfather Jørgen Thormøhlen, a merchant, shipowner, slave trader, industrialist and entrepreneur. After the death of Fasting, the property had various owners and was once used as the Bergen mental hospital. Since 1968, the manor has belonged to the University of Bergen.

Claus Fasting was against the slave trade.
