= Kronstad Station =

Former railway station in Bergen, Norway

Coordinates: 60°22′19″N 5°20′57″E

Kronstad
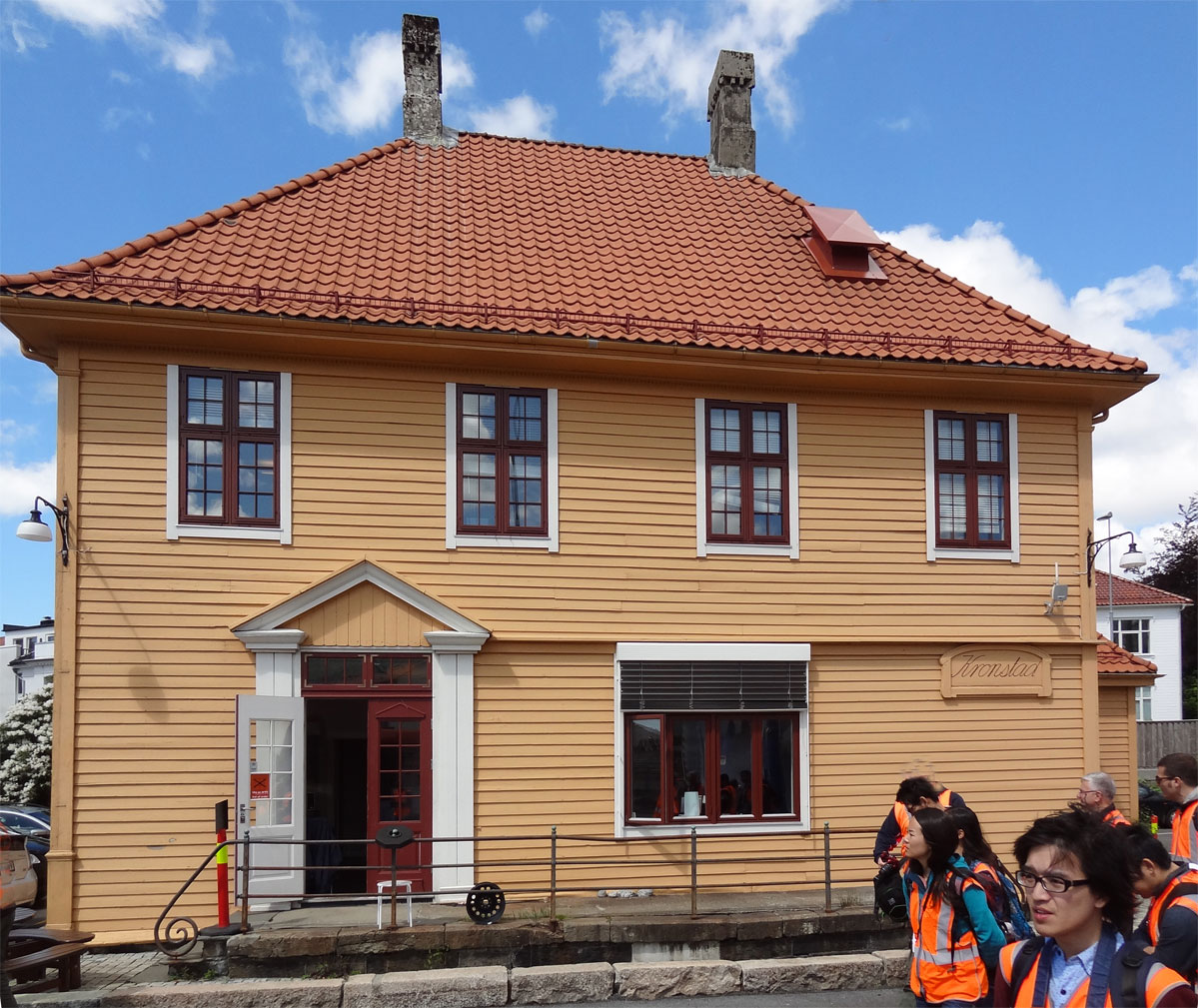

General information
- Location: Kronstad, Bergen Municipality; Norway
- Owner: Norwegian National Rail Administration
- Lines: Bergen Line, Voss Line

Construction
- Architect: Egill Reimers

History
- Opened: 1913
- Closed: 1965
Location

Kronstad Station is a former railway station at Kronstad in Bergen Municipality, Norway. It opened in 1913 and closed in 1965. It was served by trains on the Bergen Line until January 1965, when the stretch on which the station was located was closed following the opening of the Ulriken Tunnel in 1964. The former station is located south of the Kronstad Tunnel, which passes under Haukeland University Hospital and Møllendal Cemetery between Kronstad and Fløen. There were plans for converting the tunnel into a bicycle path, as it is rarely used by trains nowadays.
