= Bergen Teknikersamfund =

Norwegian student organisation

Bergen Technical Society (Bergen Teknikersamfund) is a student organization at Western Norway University of Applied Sciences in Bergen, Norway.

Bergen Technical Society is one of the oldest student organizations in Norway. It was founded 21 November 1877, with the name Regulatoren. At first, it was an organization reserved for engineering students. In recent years, the society has been opened for all students, providing non-curricular activities for students at the university.

== Other sources ==
- Ertresvaag, Egil (2002) Bergen teknikersamfund 125 år : jubileumsskrift (Bergen: Høgskolen i Bergen) ISBN 8277090536
