= Fana, Bergen =

Borough of Bergen, Norway

Fana bydel
- Borough
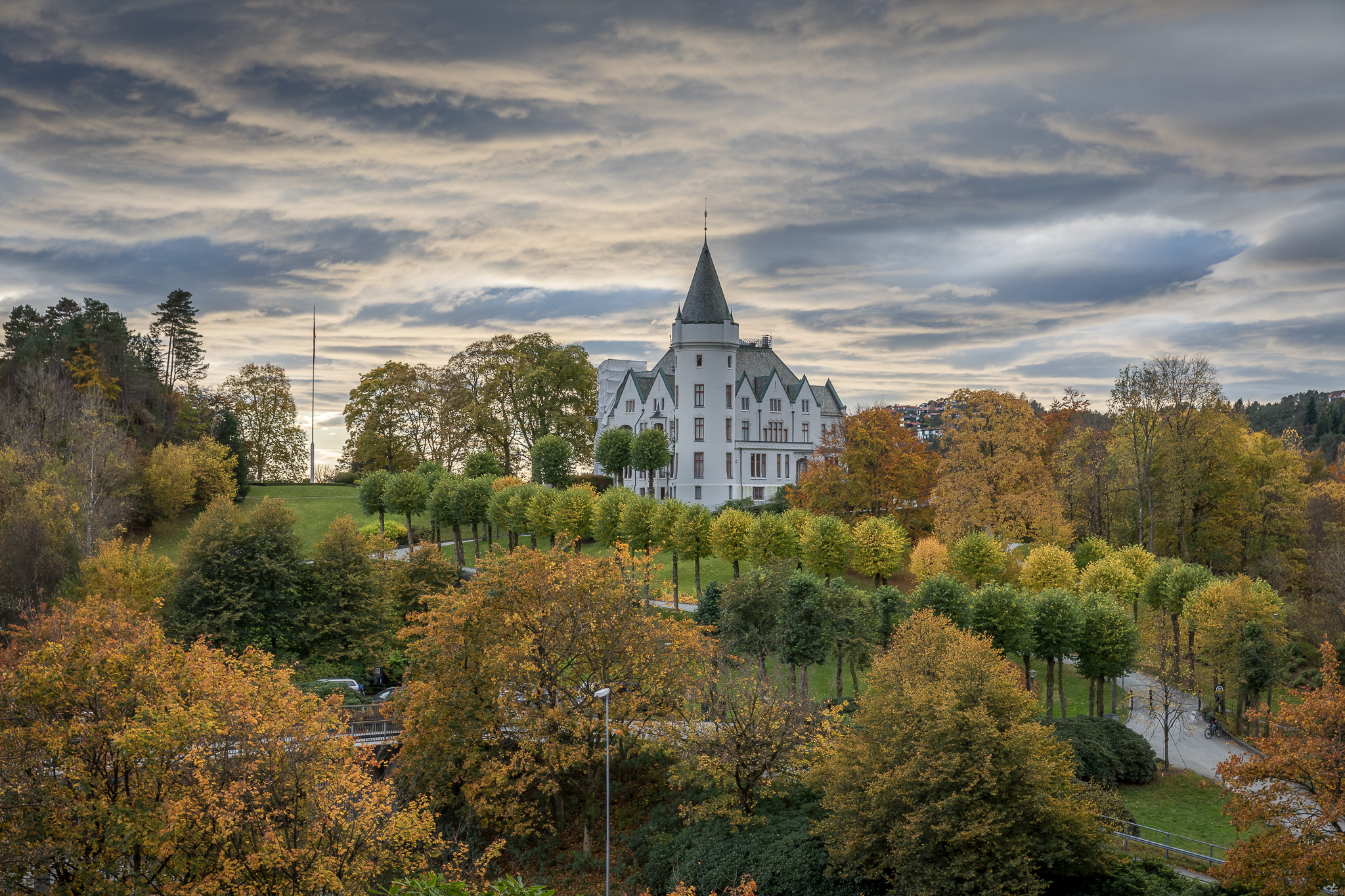

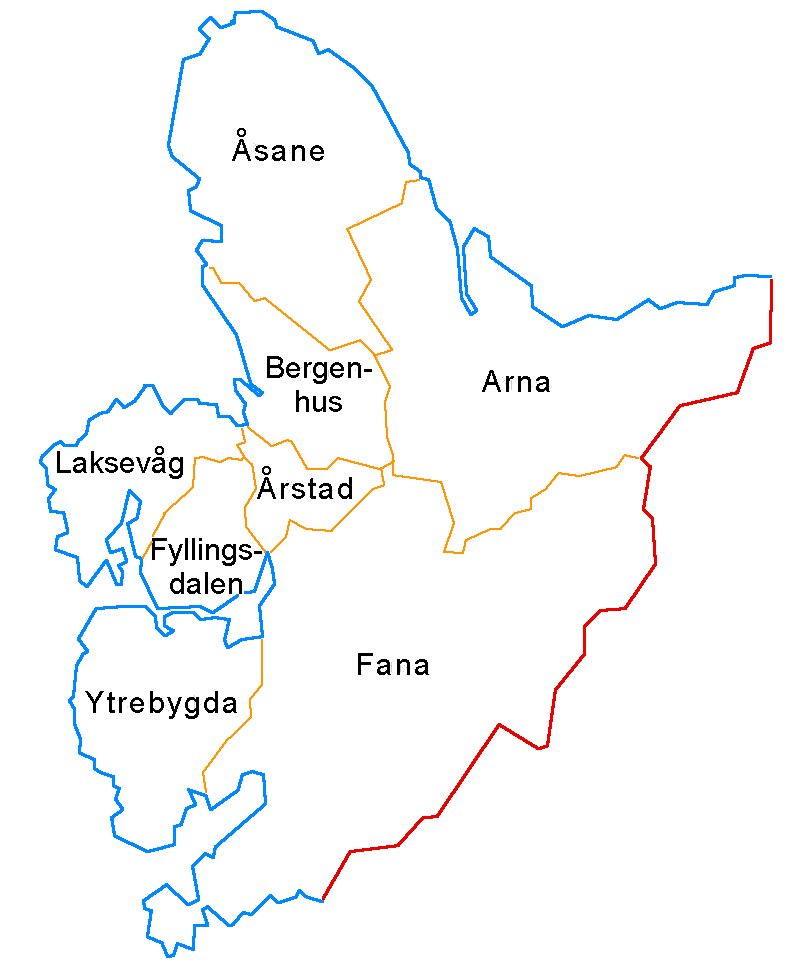
- Map of the 8 boroughs of Bergen
- Coordinates: 60°18′40″N 05°23′29″E
- Country: Norway
- Region: Western Norway
- County: Vestland
- District: Midhordland
- City: Bergen

Area
  - Total: 150.99 km^{2} (58.30 sq mi)
  - Rank: 1st
- 33.9% of total

Population (2014)
  - Total: 40,871
  - Rank: 1st
  - Density: 270.69/km^{2} (701.08/sq mi)
- 15% of total
- Time zone: UTC+01:00 (CET)
  - Summer (DST): UTC+02:00 (CEST)
- ISO 3166 code: NO-120113-15

Historical population
Year	Pop.	±%
1980	25,050	—
1990	27,163	+8.4%
2001	32,393	+19.3%
2013	40,087	+23.8%
Source: Statistics Norway.

Fana is a borough of the city of Bergen in Vestland county, Norway. The borough makes up the southeastern part of the municipality of Bergen. The borough was once part of the historic Fana Municipality which was incorporated into Bergen in 1972. The old municipality was much larger than the present-day borough of Fana. It also included all of the present-day boroughs of Ytrebygda and Fyllingsdalen as well as the southern part of the present-day boroughs of Årstad. As of 1 January 2012, Fana had a population of 39,216.

== Toponymy ==
"The name is really [a] farm name, in Old Norse fani, which probably means swampland or myrlende" (or fen), according to the Store norske leksikon.

== Geography ==
Fana is the geographically largest of the city's boroughs, with an area of 151 km^{2} (58 sq mi). Most major industries in Fana are located near the neighborhood of Nesttun (which was the administrative centre of the old Fana municipality). The northeastern part is dominated by residential areas, being home to the majority of the borough's population, while the rest of the borough contains mostly forest, mountains, some farmland, in addition to a few settlements. The mountain Livarden lies along the northeastern boundary of the borough.

=== Villages and neighborhoods ===
The villages and neighborhoods in the borough include: Fanahammeren, Nattland, Nesttun, Paradis, Nordvåg, Skjold, and Krokvåg.

== Landmarks ==
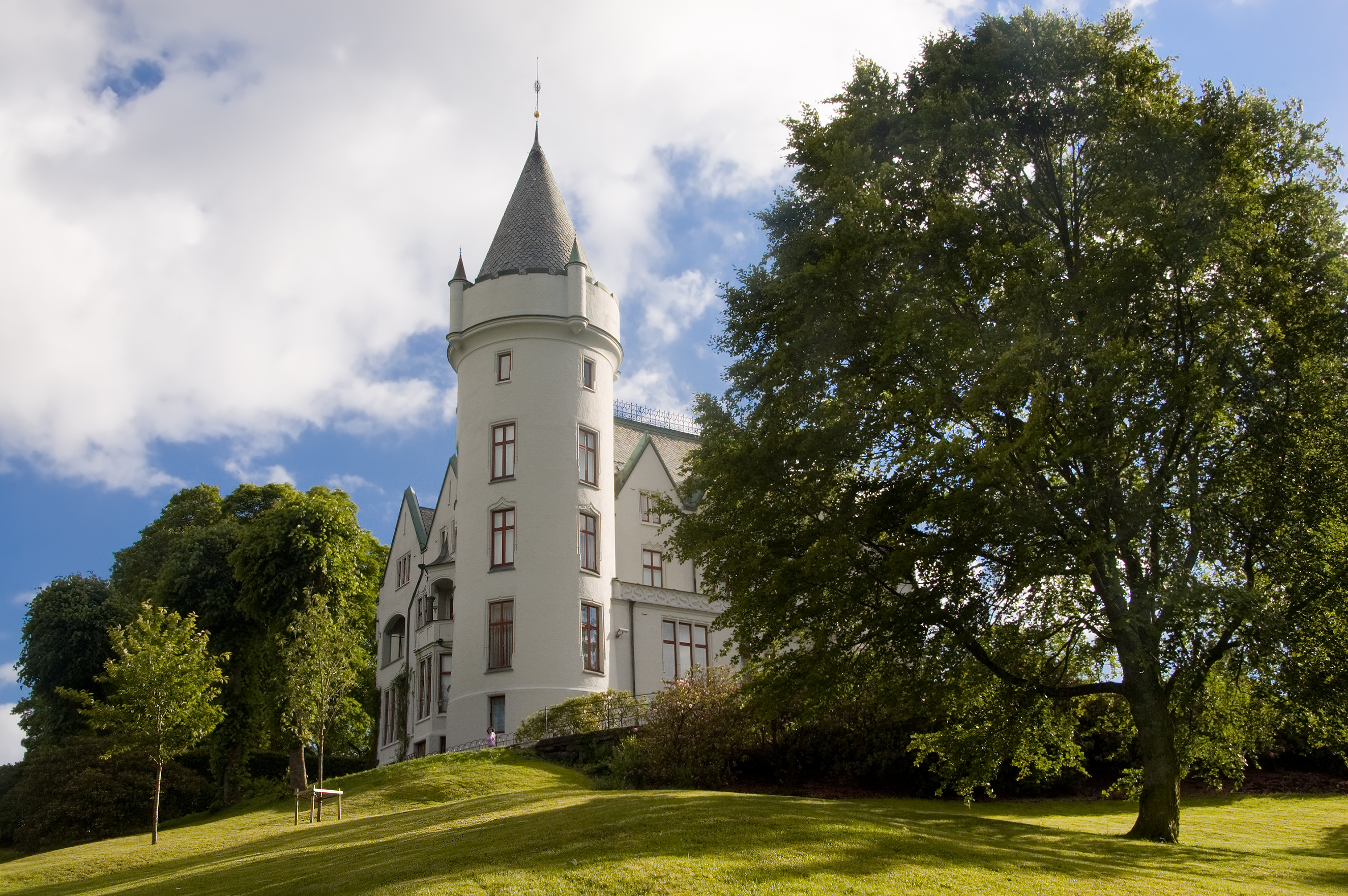
The main building at Gamlehaugen

Gamlehaugen is located by the lake Nordåsvannet in northern Fana, south of the present-day Fjøsanger residential area. The mansion is the residence of the royal family in Bergen, and is surrounded by a park. It was commissioned by Christian Michelsen, a shipping magnate and later Prime Minister of Norway, in 1899, and he lived there until his death in 1925. While the park is open to the public at almost all times, the building is only open for a few hours a day in the summer and receives about 2000 visitors a year.

Hop is the location of Troldhaugen, a museum and home of the composer Edvard Grieg 1885-1907.

A replica of the Fantoft Stave Church has been located in Fana since 1997. The original was built in 1150 and it burned down in 1992, 109 years after it was moved to Bergen in 1883. Fana Church is a more recently built church that is used for most church functions in the area.

== Culture ==
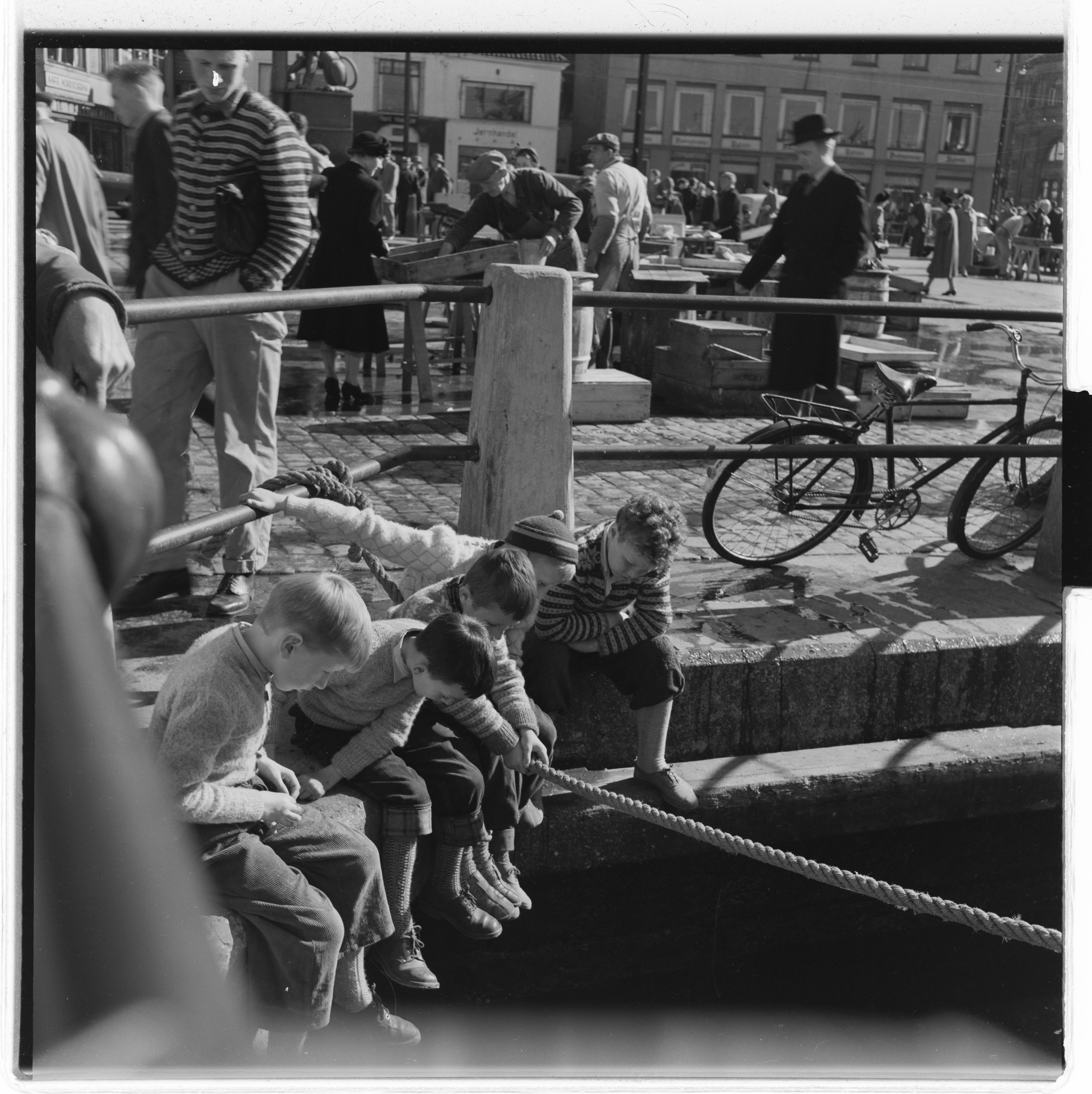
Fanakofte used in Bergen, 1953

=== Fashion ===
The Fanakofte is an old cardigan (sweater) pattern.

=== Food ===
The "Fanaost" gouda cheese won World Cheese Awards in 2018.

=== Sport ===
Sports teams include IL Gneist, IL Bjarg and Fana IL and the athletics club FIK BFG Fana.

=== Choirs ===
Choirs include Sola Fide, Fana Mannskor, Korall.

== Transport ==
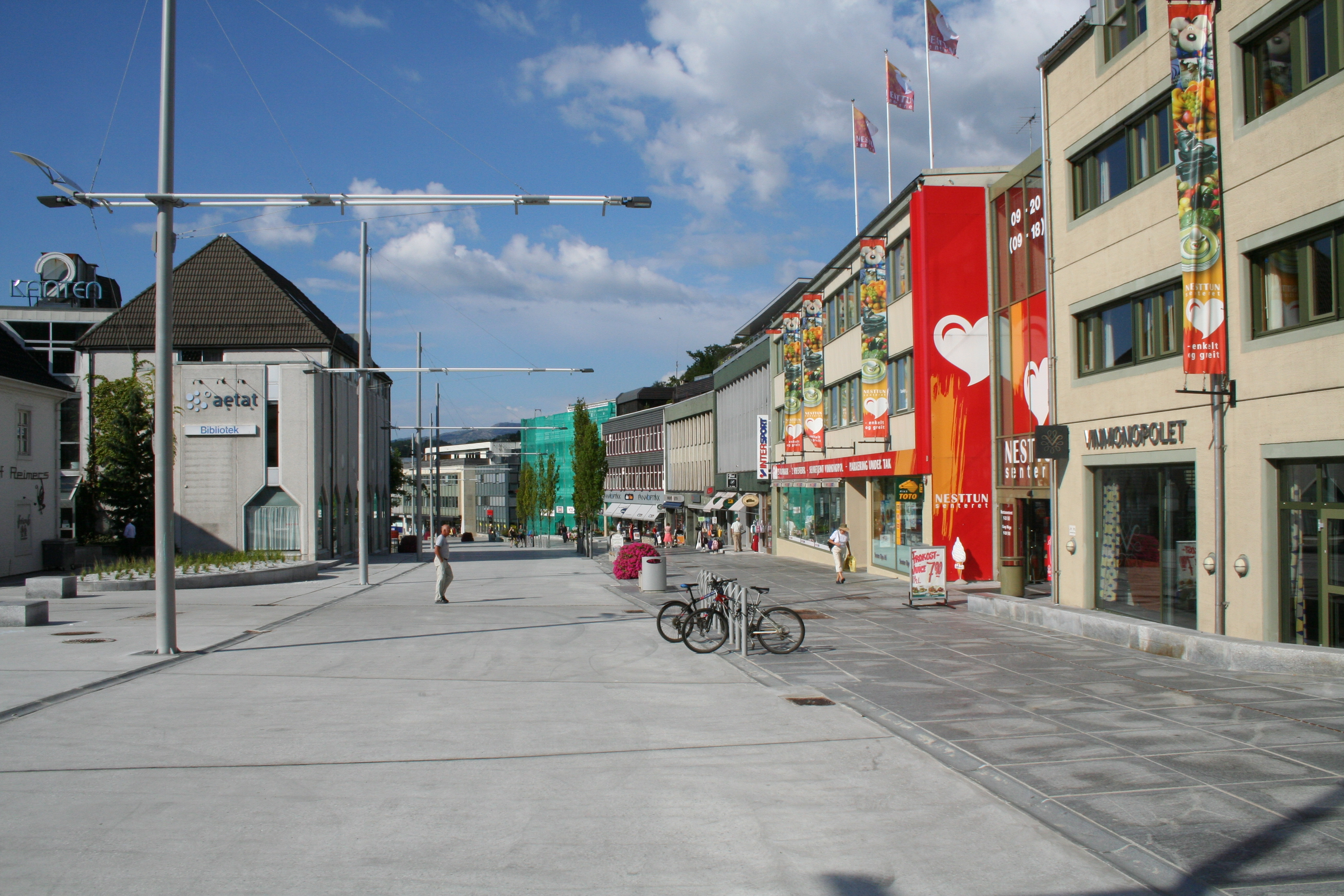
A shopping street in Nesttun, a commercial centre in Fana.

The European route E39 highway passes through the borough of Fana. From the border with Årstad borough (north of Fjøsanger) to the neighborhood of Hop, the E39 highway is the 4-lane dual carriageway called Fritz C. Riebers veg. At Hop, the E39 highway branches off from the 4-lane road and passes through two tunnels on its way to the village of Nesttun, where-from it continues southwestwards through Valla and Kaland before entering the neighboring Bjørnafjorden Municipality. From Hop, Fritz C. Riebers veg continues southwards as Rv 580 to Lagunen Storsenter.

Prior to the construction of Fritz C. Riebers veg, the main road between central Bergen and Fana had been Fv 582, which passes through Storetveit, Paradis, Hop, Nesttun and Skjold from Årstad borough to Lagunen Storsenter. Other significant roads include Rv 546 from Lagunen Storsenter through Fanahammeren to Krokvåg, Fv 585 from Landås in Årstad through Nattland to Paradis, Fv 163 over Fanafjellet to Nordvik, and Fv 183 past Bjøllebotn to Myrdal.

Due to the insufficient standard of E39, the main road between Bergen and Os and Stavanger, plans have been prepared for a new 4-lane road southwards from Bergen. The new road, which will branch off from Fritz C. Riebers veg north of Lagunen, will be funded partly by toll revenue.

As elsewhere in Bergen, the bus service in Fana is operated by Tide Buss.

== Education ==
In Fana, there are 13 elementary schools, three lower secondary schools, two combined elementary/lower secondary schools, one special school, and 3 upper secondary schools in Fana. With the exception of the upper secondary schools (which are administered by Hordaland county), all the schools are owned and administered by Bergen municipality.

== Notable people ==
- Kygo
- Nordahl Grieg
- Alan Walker
- Erna Solberg
- Varg Vikernes
- Stig Van Eijk
