= Jørgen Thormøhlen =

German-born Norwegian industrialist (1640–1708)

Jørgen Thormøhlen (born as Jürgen ter Maulen in Hamburg; c. 1640 – 25 December 1708) was a German-born Norwegian merchant, shipowner, slave trader and industrialist.

== Biography ==
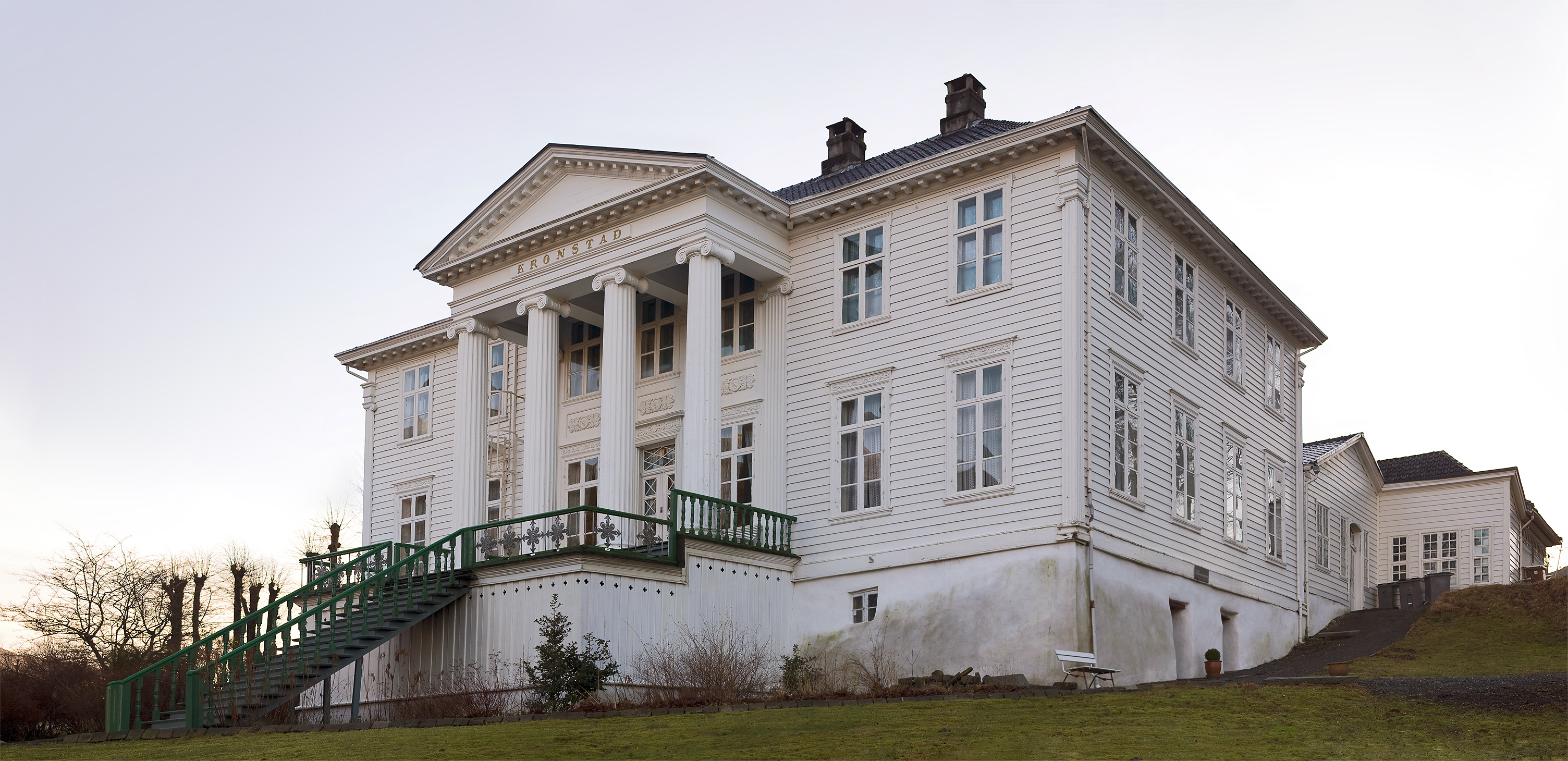
Kronstad Hovedgård, which was Thormøhlen's residence from 1685 to 1693

Thormøhlen was born c. 1640. He was the son of Jürgen ther Möhlen (born 1615), a German wine trader from Hamburg. In 1664, he settled in Bergen, where he married Giertrud Magers. She was the daughter of naturalized citizen Hendrich Magers, who was regarded as the wealthiest merchant in Bergen. Thormøhlen became the largest ship-owner in Norway, trading fish from Northern Norway and being involved in a number of other businesses. He made his fortune through overseas and domestic trade (including the Danish slave trade) and owning ships. He also developed an industrial site located at Vestre Sydnes. The property included a salt refinery, packing sheds, a deep-water harbour, and employee homes.

Thormøhlen was the main owner of the Norwegian slave ship Cornelia, which in 1673 sailed to West Africa transporting a cargo of liquor and trinkets which it exchanged for a number of enslaved Africans; 103 slaves were transported to the island of Saint Thomas in the Danish West Indies by the Cornelia. In the next year, the Cornelia made another triangular trade voyage, again delivering 103 slaves to Saint Thomas. In 1682, King Christian V proclaimed him trade director. in 1695, he received royal permission to issue banknotes supported by a loan from the king. From 1685 to 1693, Thormøhlen owned the Kronstad Hovedgård manor house, which was located in the borough of Årstad (on the southern shore of the bay of Store Lungegårdsvannet) south of the city. However, heavy financial losses in overseas trade along with a major series of structure fires at Bryggen in 1702 created difficulties for Thormøhlen, who eventually went bankrupt.

== Personal life and legacy ==
He was married to Giertrud Magers, daughter of Hendrich Magers and Mægtele Lorentzen; the couple were the parents of a number of children. Thormøhlen was the great-grandfather of playwright, literary critic, editor and civil servant Claus Fasting. After his death, Thormøhlen's involvement in the Atlantic slave trade had come under controversy. During the 2020 George Floyd protests, there were calls to remove a statue of him in Bergen. A neighbourhood of the city, Møhlenpris, which was named after Thormøhlen has faced calls to be renamed.
