= Sogn og Fjordane University College =

Institute of higher educational in Førde, Vestlandet, Norway

Sogn and Fjordane University College

Location
- Førde, Vestlandet; Norway
- Coordinates: 61°27′33″N 5°53′26″E

Information
- Website: https://www.hvl.no/

Sogn and Fjordane University College (Norwegian: Høgskulen i Sogn og Fjordane, HiSF) was a Norwegian state institution of higher education, in the county of Sogn og Fjordane. The college is now part of Høgskulen på Vestlandet.

== History ==
The university college's campuses were located in Sogndalsfjøra and Førde, and had approximately 3,800 students and 300 employees.

Sogn og Fjordane University College was divided into four faculties: Faculty of Engineering and Science, Faculty of Health Studies, Faculty of Social Sciences and Faculty of Teacher Education and Sports.
