= Krokvåg =

Village in Tvedestrand Municipality, Norway

- Village
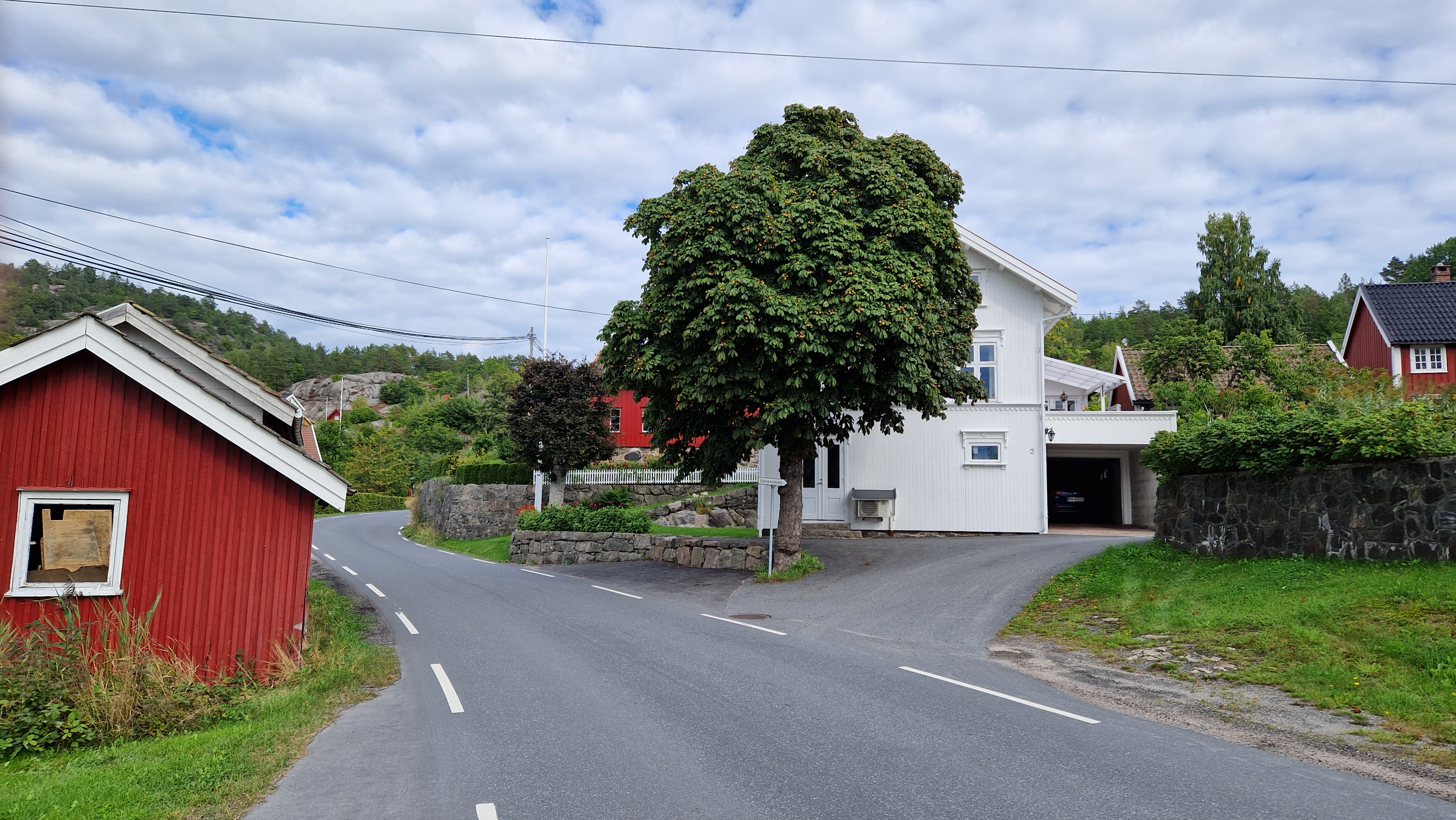
- View of the village
- Interactive map of Krokvåg
- Coordinates: 58.6228°N 09.0311°E
- Country: Norway
- Region: Southern Norway
- County: Agder
- District: Østre Agder
- Municipality: Tvedestrand Municipality
- Elevation: 2 m (6.6 ft)
- Time zone: UTC+01:00 (CET)
  - Summer (DST): UTC+02:00 (CEST)
- Post Code: 4900 Tvedestrand

Krokvåg is a village in Tvedestrand Municipality in Agder county, Norway. The village is located along the Norwegian County Road 411, just west of the village of Dypvåg and about 4 kilometres (2.5 mi) east of the village of Sagesund.
