= Haukeland =

Haukeland is a Norwegian surname. Notable people with the surname include:

- Andreas Haukeland (born 1993), better known as Tix, Norwegian singer
- Arnold Haukeland (1920-1983), Norwegian sculptor
- Henrik Haukeland (born 1994), Norwegian professional ice hockey player
- Jon Haukeland (born 1953), Norwegian ice hockey coach and administrator
- Mons Haukeland (1892-1983), Norwegian gymnastics teacher and military officer

== See also ==
- Hege Haukeland Liadal (born 1972), Norwegian politician and fraudster
- Haukeland University Hospital, a hospital in Bergen, Norway
