= Bjøllebotn =

Area of Bergen, Norway

Coordinates: 60.3093°N 5.3883°E

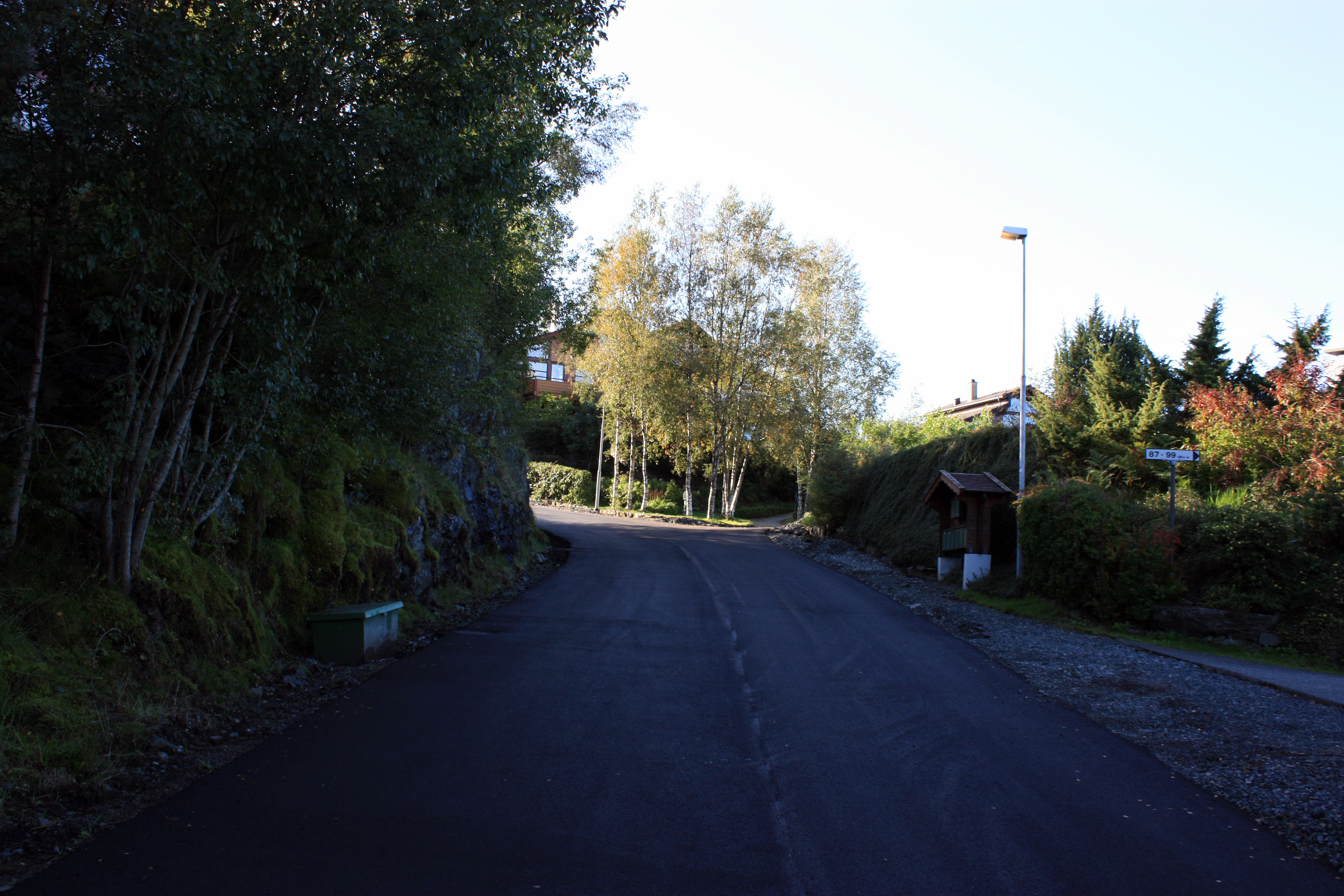

Bjøllebotn is a residential area near the commercial centre of Nesttun in the city of Bergen, Norway.

Bjøllebotn has about 250 residents living in 100 houses, mostly detached. Bjøllebotn is known for its cheap houses by the forest. At the time of the founding of Bjøllebotn in the 1970s, the roads were made up of gravel. Bjøllebotn expanded twice in the early 1980s, and the road has been paved.
