= Western Norway University of Applied Sciences =

Norwegian public institution of higher learning

- Høgskulen på Vestlandet
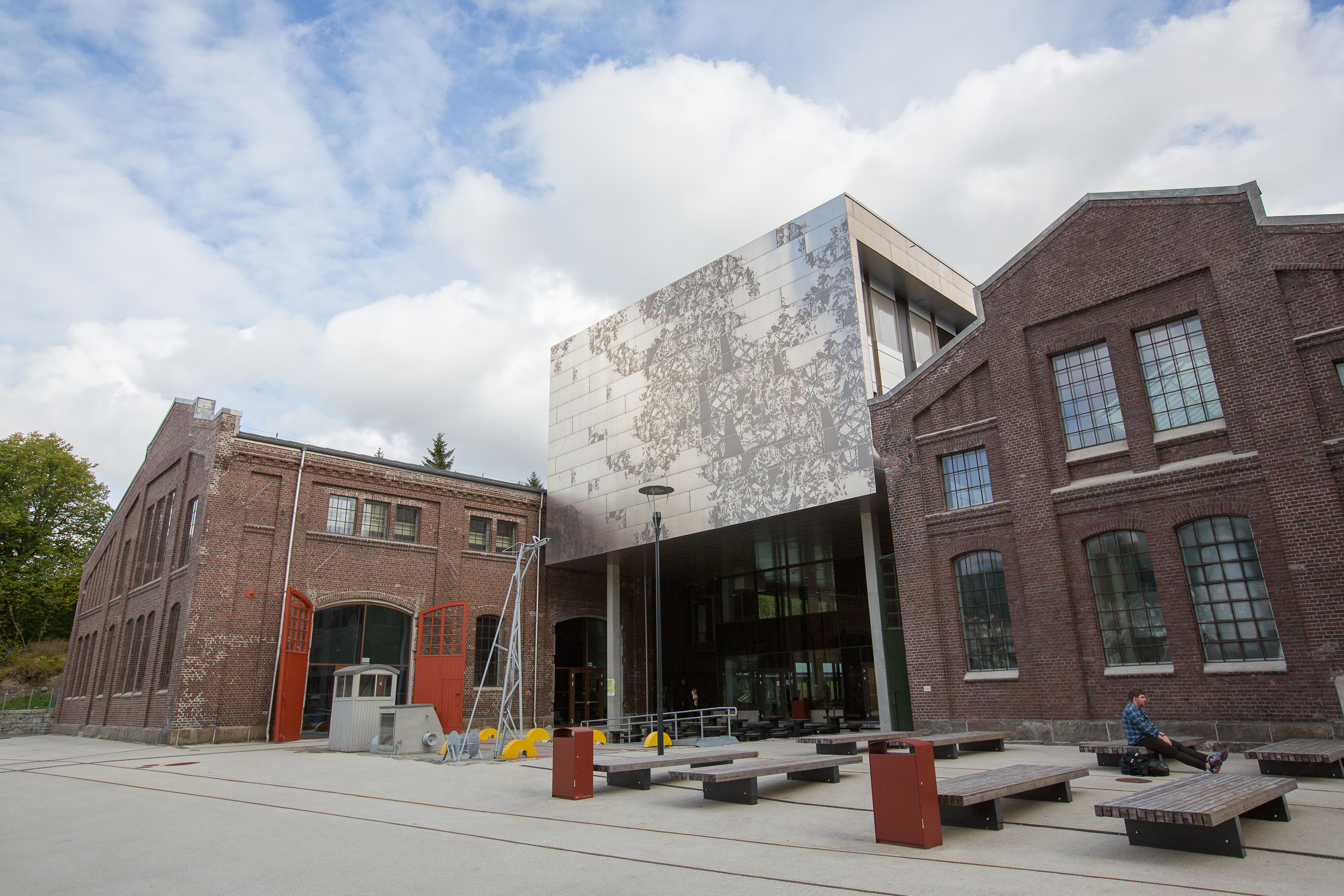
- Campus Bergen
- Type: University College
- Established: 2017; 9 years ago (1839; 187 years ago)
- Rector: Gunnar Yttri
- Administrative staff: 1800
- Students: 16,000
- Location: Bergen, Norway; 60°22′09″N 5°20′58″E
- Website: www.hvl.no

Western Norway University of Applied Sciences (Nynorsk: Høgskulen på Vestlandet; Bokmål: Høgskolen på Vestlandet), or HVL, is a Norwegian public institution of higher education, established in January 2017 through the merging of formerly independent colleges across five campuses: Bergen, Førde, Haugesund, Sogndalsfjøra and Stord. Its oldest programs – teacher education in Stord – can be traced to 1839. The total number of students at HVL is about 16000, and there are 1800 academic and administrative staff. Its main campus is in the Kronstad neighborhood of Bergen, Norway.

Western Norway University of Applied Sciences provides professional education within health and social sciences, engineering, economic and administrative science, music and teaching. It offers education on the Bachelor and Master levels, continuing education, and on the Doctoral (PhD) level. Around 2700 students graduate with degrees from HVL every year.

In June, 2016, after more than one year of negotiations, the executive leadership of three west Norwegian higher education institutions – Bergen University College, Stord/Haugesund University College, and Sogn og Fjordane University College – officially announced their decision to merge. From 2017, the English name is Western Norway University of Applied Sciences (abbreviated according to the Norwegian name: HVL).

The founding Rector (President) was professor Berit Rokne, and in 2021 Gunnar Yttri, a historian, was appointed the institution's Rector for the period 2021–2024.

== Faculties ==
The college is organised in three faculties:

- Faculty of Education, Arts and Sports
- Faculty of Technology, Environmental and Social Sciences
- Faculty of Health and Social Sciences

== Centres ==
HVL emphasizes professional studies, but also offers postgraduate programs through the doctoral level in some fields, and currently has ten research centers to support its specialized postgraduate programs, providing opportunities for PhD research:

- Centre for Evidence-Based Practice
- Centre for Arts, Culture, and Communication
- The Mohn Centre of Innovation and Regional Development
- Centre for Care Research, Western Norway
- Centre for Educational Research
- KINDknow – Kindergarten Knowledge Centre for Systemic Research on Diversity and Sustainable Futures
- The Centre for Health Research
- The Norwegian National Centre for Food, Health and Physical Activity
- Centre for Creativities, Arts and Science in Education
- Maritime Research Centre

There is also a Centre for New Media.

== Norwegian diver school ==
The Norwegian diver school (Norwegian: Statens dykkerskole) was a public diving school for professional divers located in Gravdal, Bergen, Norway. Established in 1980, it was merged and became part of Bergen University College (now part of the Western Norway University of Applied Sciences) in 2005. The diving school is a part of the Faculty of Engineering and Science, and is located in Skålevik, approximately 15 kilometers from Bergen city centre.

== See also ==
- Grieg Academy – Music department at the University of Bergen
- Bergen Teknikersamfund – Norwegian student organisation
- University of Bergen – Public university in Bergen, Norway
- Stord/Haugesund University College – Educational institution in Norway
- Sogn og Fjordane University College – Institute of higher educational in Førde, Vestlandet, Norway
