= Kronstad Hovedgård =

Manor house in Bergen, Norway

Coordinates: 60°22′37.258″N 5°20′46.882″E

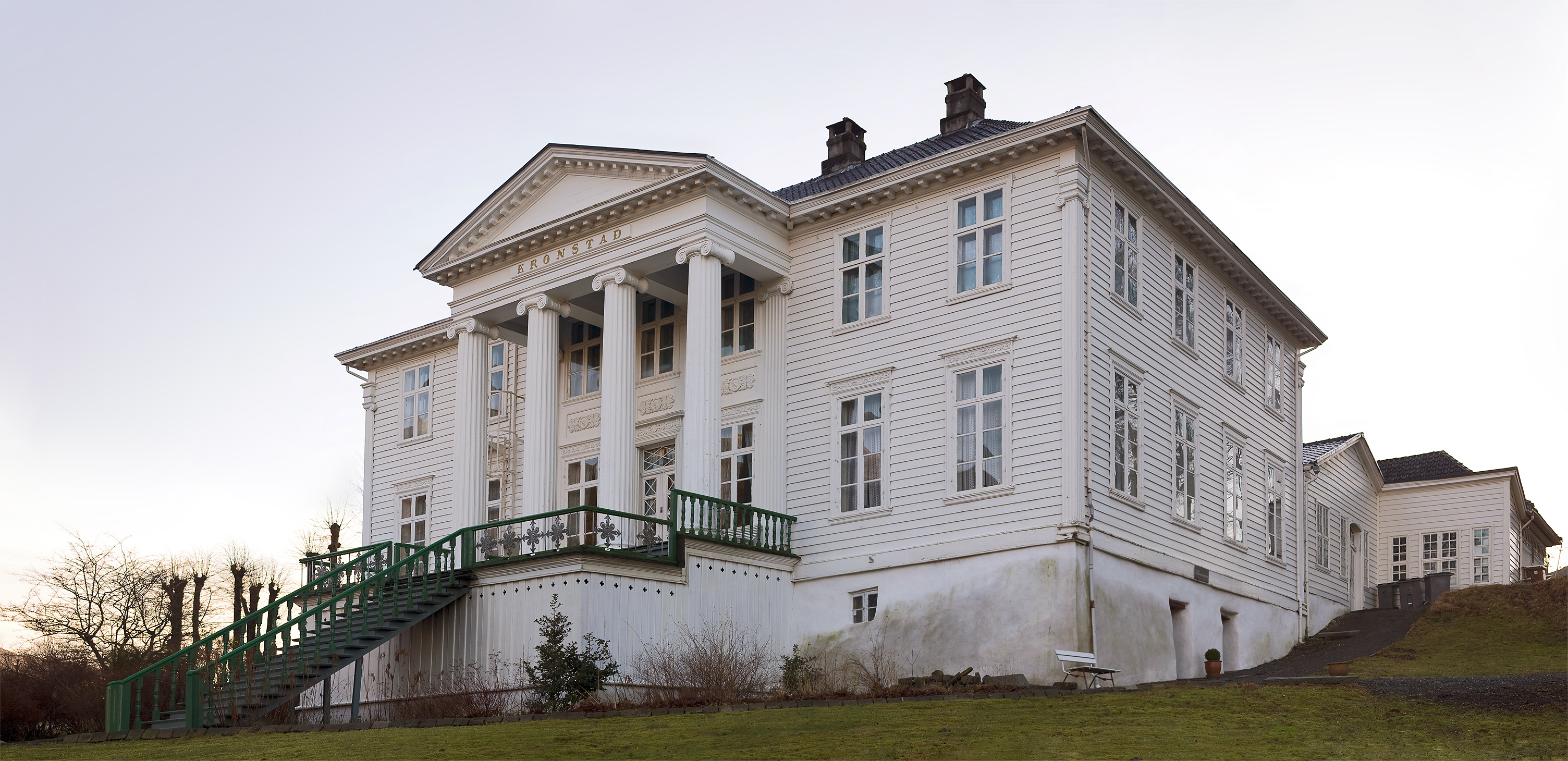
Kronstad Hovedgård main building. 2007

Kronstad Hovedgård is a manor house in the city of Bergen, Norway. It is situated in the borough of Årstad about 2 km south of the Bergenhus on the south shore of the bay of Store Lungegårdsvannet.

== History ==
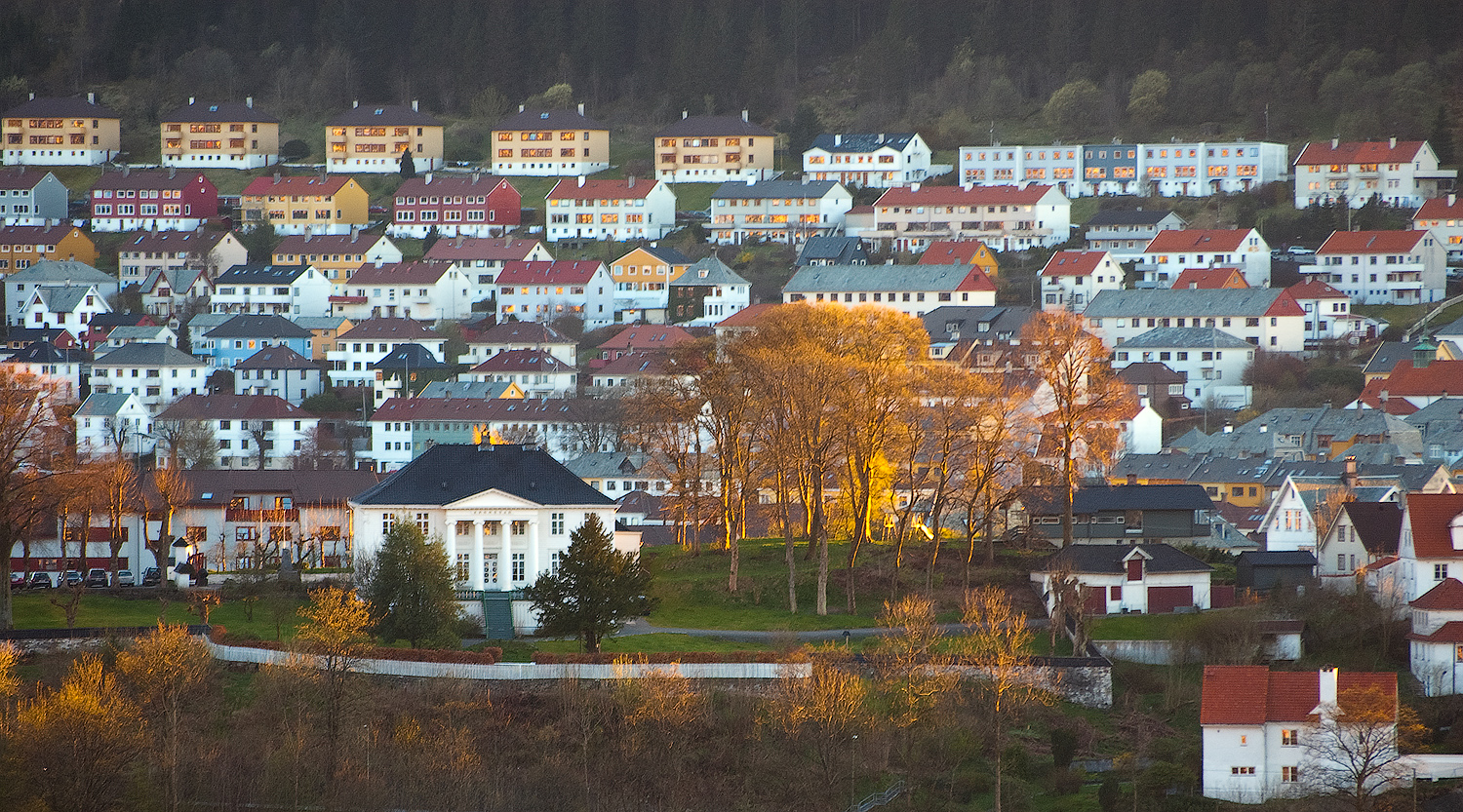
Kronstad Hovedgård in Årstad

The farm of Kronstad, then named Hunsstadir, later Honstad and Hunstad, was established in the 12th century. It belonged to the monastery of Nonneseter. Vincens Lunge took over the farm in 1528. From 1685 to 1693, the manor belonged to Jørgen Thormøhlen, a merchant, shipowner, slave trader and industrialist. In 1705, vicar of Bergen Cathedral Anders Bruun purchased the manor and renamed it Cronstad. Christian Gerhard Ameln, a merchant, purchased it in 1781, constructing several new buildings and clearing the fields. Ameln also constructed a new one-floored manor house.

Joachim Friele, a merchant who worked as a wine importer, bought Kronstad in 1840. Inspired by the French Château Margaux, he hired architect Ole Peter Riis Høegh to reconstruct the building. At the time, it was one of the largest private mansions in the district. The house is a white painted, two-story, wooden building with a canopy in Empire style with Ionian columns on the main façade. The building is one of the finest late-Empire style buildings in Bergen. Today, the manor house is owned by the Stiftelsen Krigsveteranenes Minne. It is being rented out for various uses.

== Other sources ==
- Stein Thowsen and Harald Garmannslund (2000). Årstad - historisk vandring i en ny bydel. ( Bergen: Forlaget Livskunst). ISBN 9788299518017.
