= Danmarks plass =

Square in Bergen, Norway

Coordinates: 60.3765°N 5.3387°E

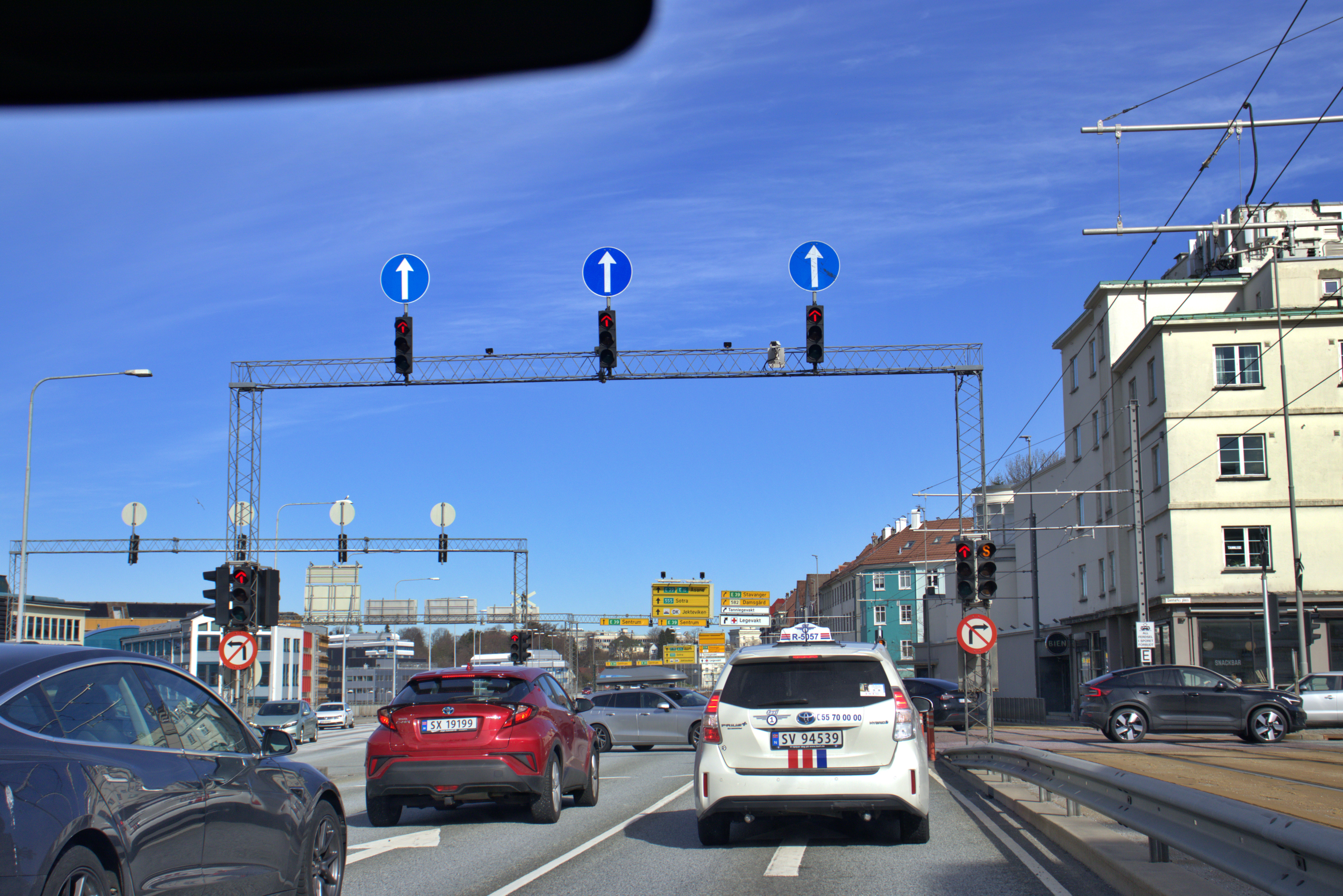
Danmarks plass

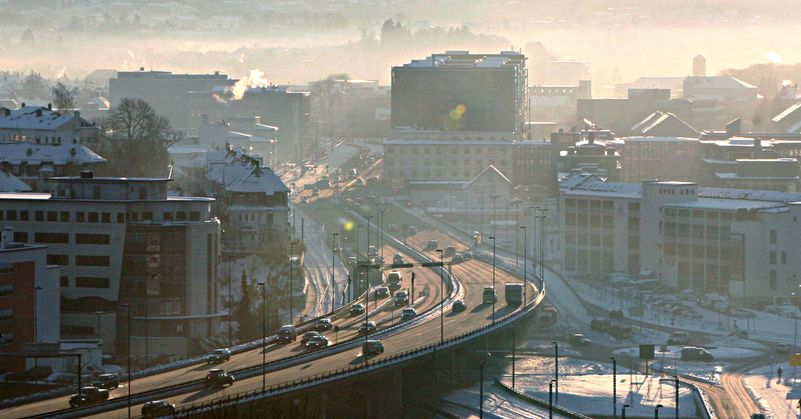
Danmarks plass can be very polluted during the winter

Danmarks plass (often written and pronounced as Danmarksplass) is a historic square in Årstad borough in the city of Bergen, Norway. Today, it is most famous as one of Norway's busiest road intersections.

== Traffic and air pollution ==
On average, more than 60,000 vehicles pass through the at-grade intersection at Danmarks plass every day. European route E39, the main road into Bergen from the south, runs through the historic square. Located near the city centre, it is a major thoroughfare for people commuting to work.

Because of the traffic and its location between two hills, Danmarks plass has more air pollution than anywhere else in Bergen.

== History ==
Danmarks plass was originally known as "Kronstadtorget". After World War II, it received its current name in honour of Denmark's humanitarian efforts in Norway during the war. Today, the name is commonly used to also refer to the immediate surroundings of the square, e.g. Krohnsminde kunstgressbane.

Line 1 of the Bergen Light Rail passes through Danmarks plass. The construction of the light rail line and stations, which was started in early 2008, lead to the closure of several lanes on E39.
