= Paradis, Bergen =

Neighbourhood of Bergen, Norway

Coordinates: 60.3368°N 5.3456°E

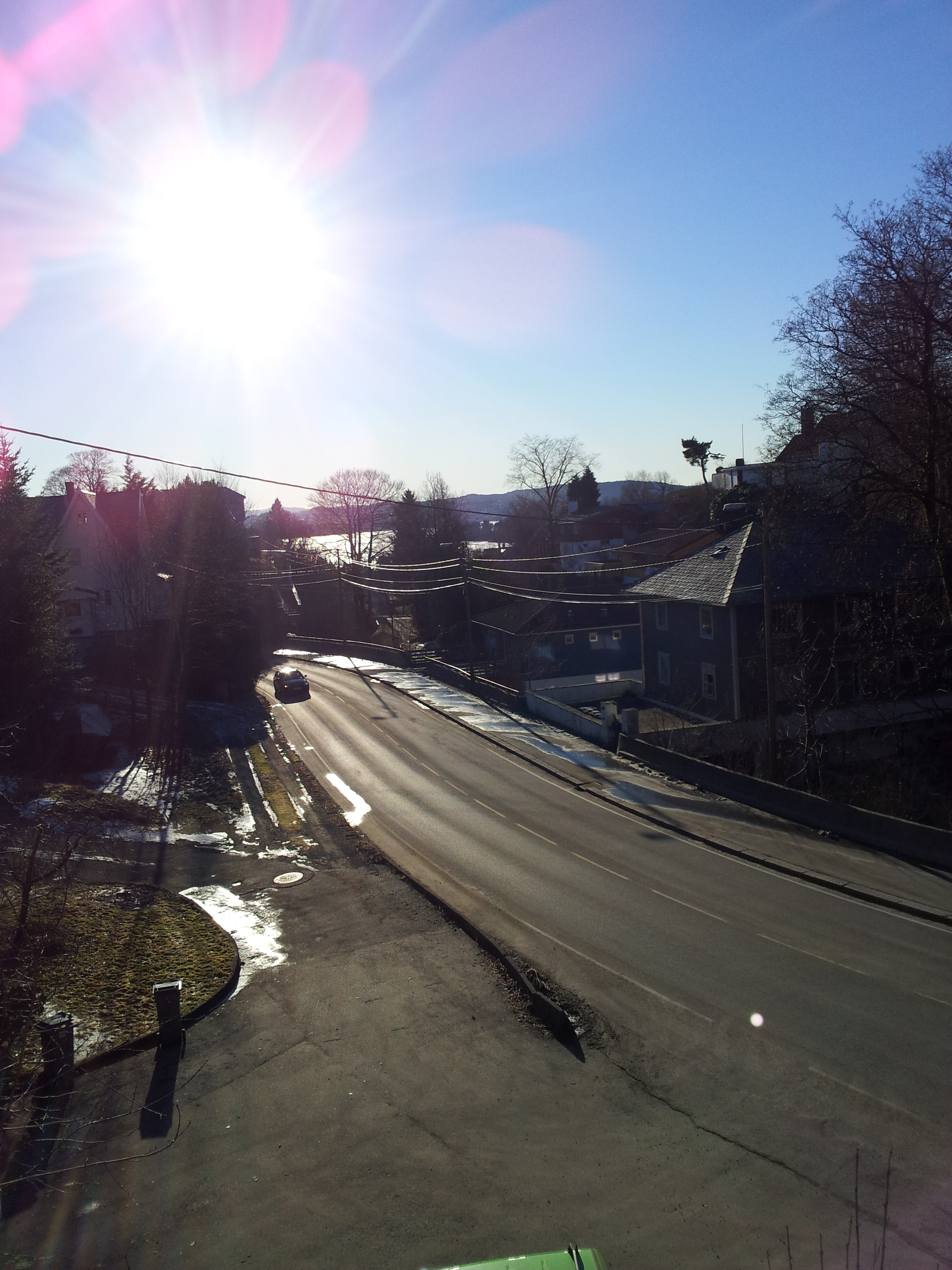
Paradis from Storetveitvegen.

Paradis is a neighborhood in the city of Bergen in Vestland county, Norway. It is located between the neighborhoods of Storetveit in the bourough of Årstad and Hop in the borough of Fana, on the eastern shore of the lake Nordåsvannet. The name, which literally means "paradise" in Norwegian, is shared with several other locations in Norway and denotes a location with positive qualities not present in the surrounding areas. Paradis is dominated by single-family detached homes, and is the location of some of the most expensive homes in the city.

== Transport ==
Paradis was a station on the Bergen Line between 1932 and 1965, being closed following the opening of the Ulriken Tunnel in 1964. It is the site of a station on the Bergen Light Rail line, which opened in 2010.
