= Fridalen Church =

Church in Vestland, Norway

- Fridalen kirke
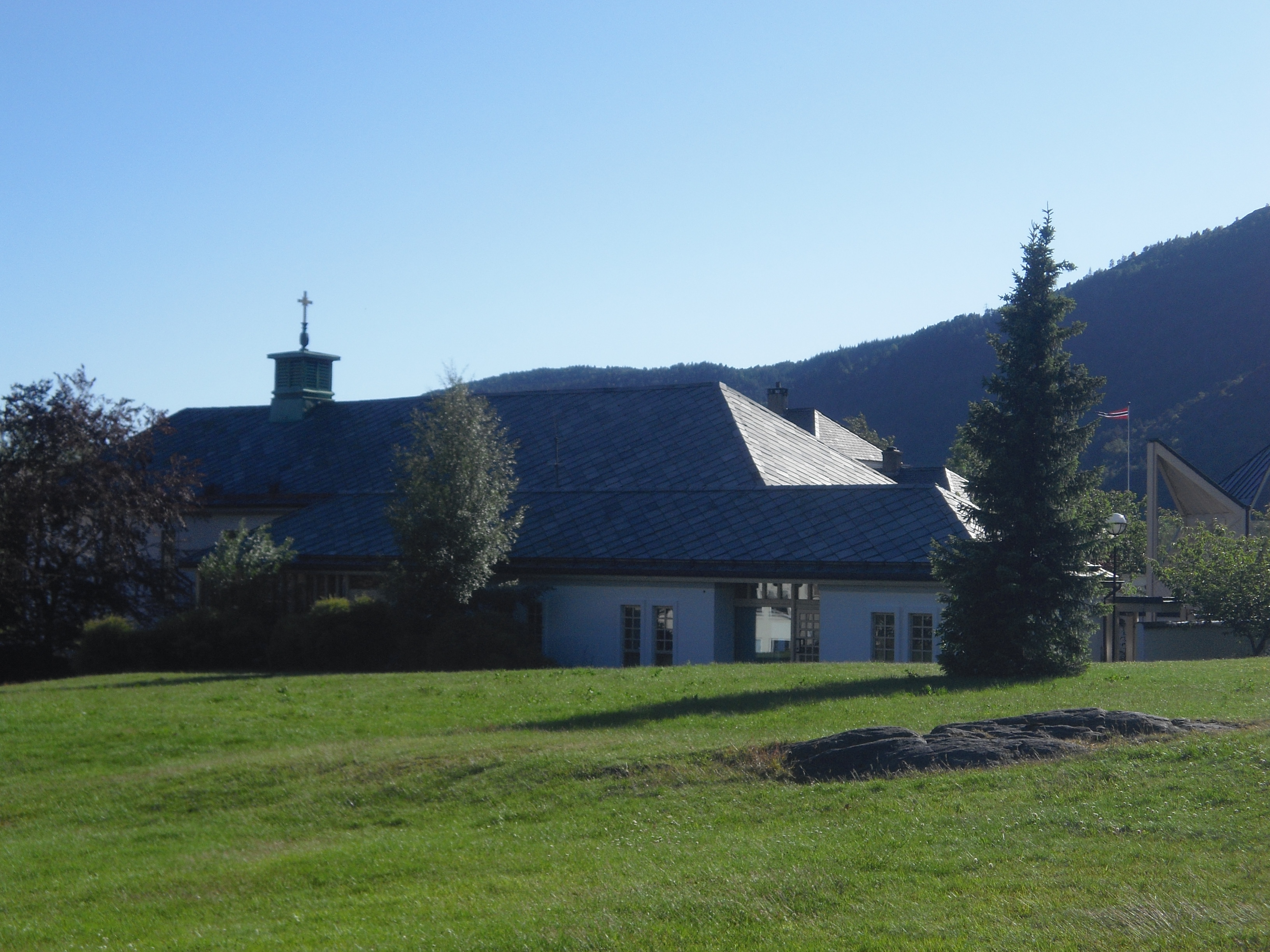
- View of the church
- Fridalen Church
- 60°21′46″N 5°21′22″E
- Location: Bergen Municipality, Vestland
- Country: Norway
- Denomination: Church of Norway
- Churchmanship: Evangelical Lutheran

History
- Status: Parish church
- Founded: 1937
- Consecrated: 6 May 1937

Architecture
- Functional status: Active
- Architect: Peter Andersen
- Architectural type: Rectangular
- Completed: 1937 (89 years ago)

Specifications
- Capacity: 450
- Materials: Stone

Administration
- Diocese: Bjørgvin bispedømme
- Deanery: Bergensdalen prosti
- Parish: Fridalen
- Norwegian Cultural Heritage Site
- Type: Church
- Status: Not protected
- ID: 84200

Fridalen Church (Norwegian: Fridalen kirke) is a parish church of the Church of Norway in Bergen Municipality in Vestland county, Norway. It is located in the Fridalen neighborhood in the borough of Årstad in the city of Bergen. It is the church for the Fridalen parish which is part of the Bergensdalen prosti (deanery) in the Diocese of Bjørgvin. The white, stone church was built in a rectangular style in 1937 using designs by the architect Peter Andersen. The church seats about 450 people.

== History ==
Construction on the new Fridalen Church took place in 1936-1937, just before the outbreak of World War II. The building was designed by Peter Andersen. It is built of plastered and whitewashed masonry and has a rectangular floor plan with a nave in the north and a choir in the south. The new building was consecrated on 6 May 1937. In 1952–1962, the choir area was enlarged, including a new sacristy and office area.

== See also ==
- List of churches in Bjørgvin
