= Landås =

Neighbourhood in Bergen, Norway

Coordinates: 60.3613°N 5.3679°E

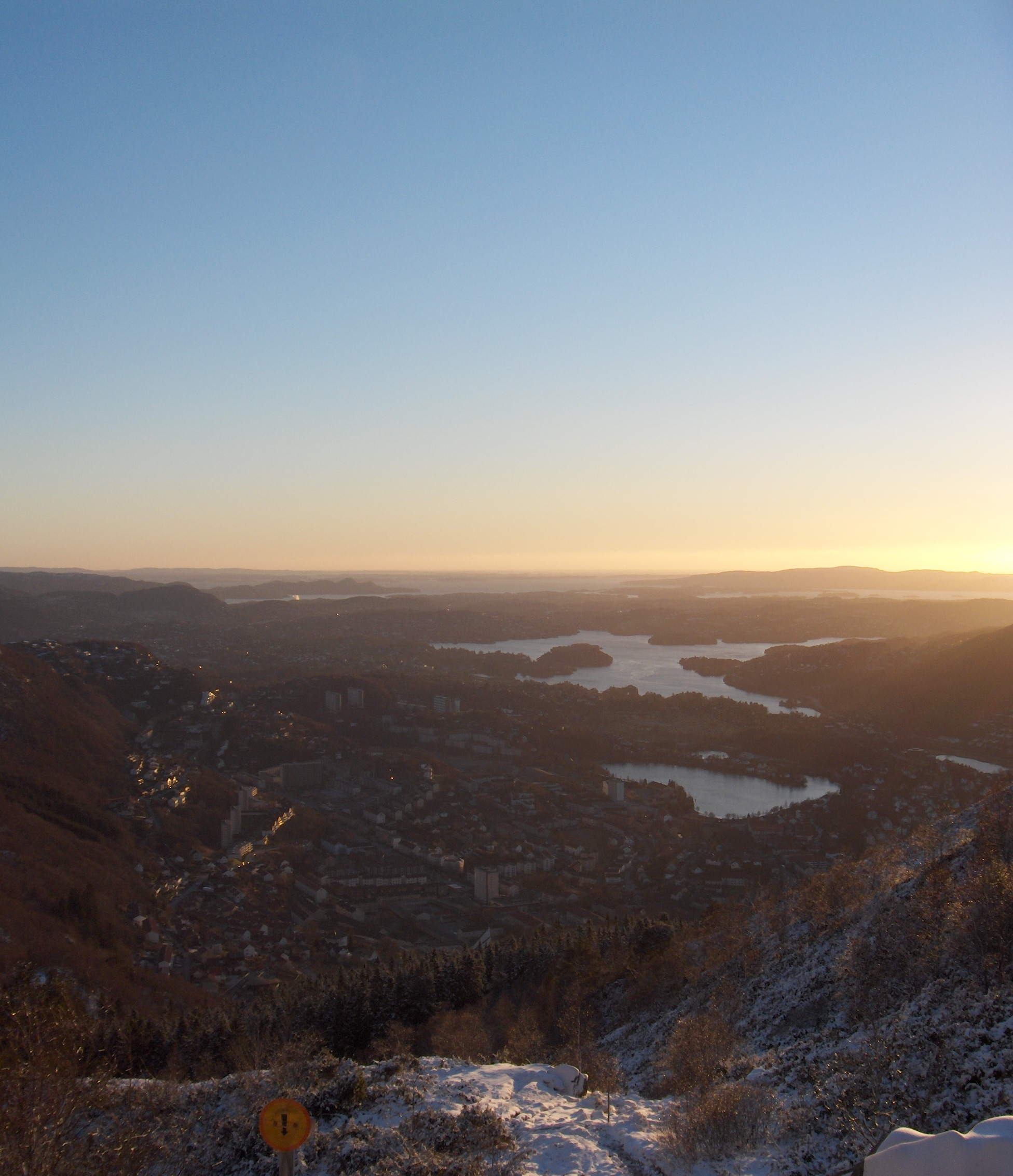
A view of Landås from Ulriken.

Landås is a neighbourhood in the city of Bergen in Vestland county, Norway. Landås is located by the western side of the Ulriken mountain massif, from southeast of Haukeland University Hospital to the neighborhood of Nattland almost 3 kilometres (1.9 mi) further south. It was the last part of the historic Aarstad Municipality to be urbanised, with the development of Landås taking place mainly after World War II. The Faculty of Education of Bergen University College is located in Landås. The Grieg Academy is the original name of the music department at this campus of Bergen University College, however the music school with a very similar name - "Grieg Academy-Institute" - is affiliated with the University of Bergen and located in downtown Bergen. The unique Landås Church is located in this neighborhood.

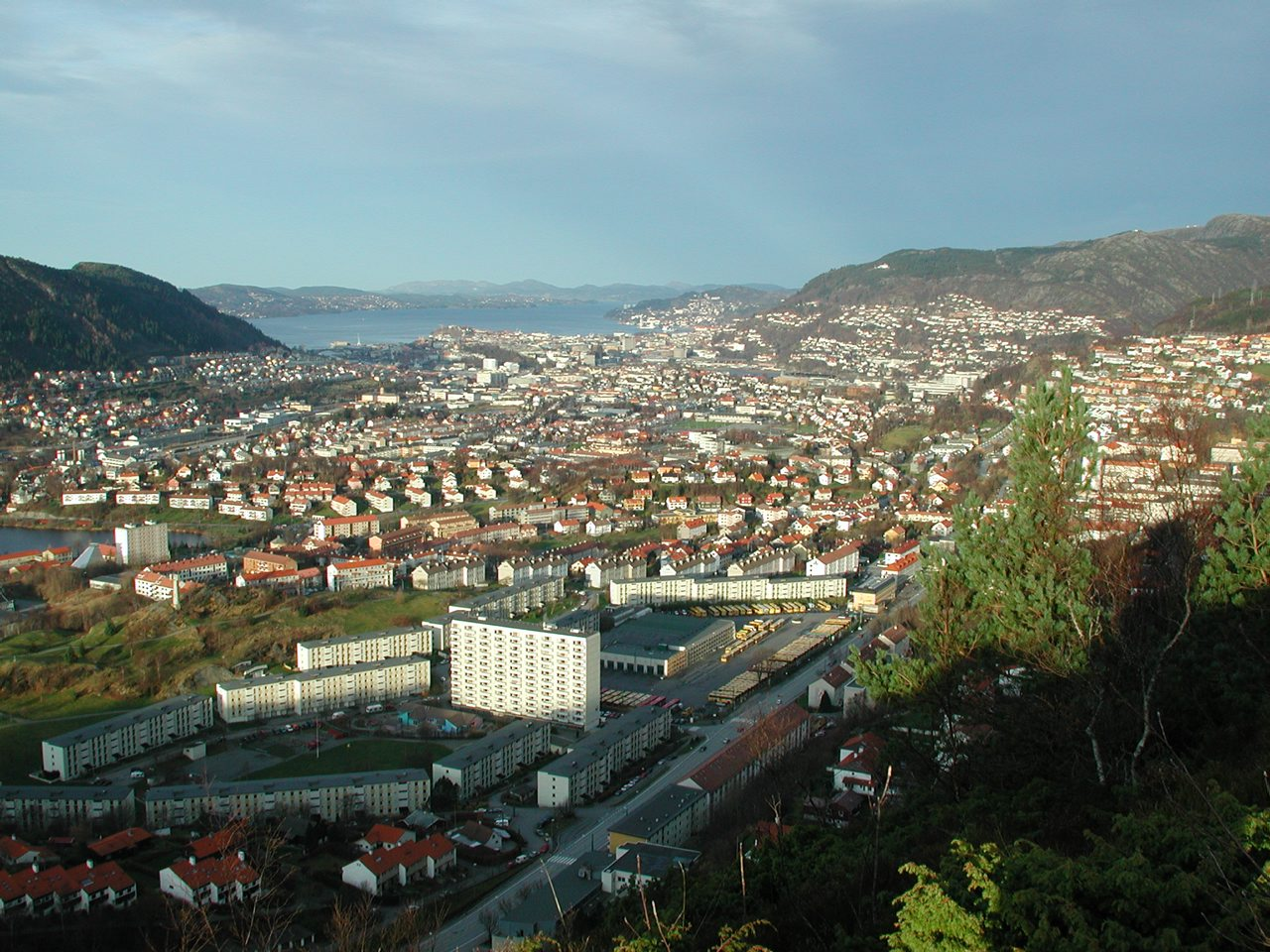
A view of Landås from Natlandsfjellet.

Landås was a separate administrative borough until the year 2000, when it was merged with the northern part of the borough of Løvstakksiden borough forming Årstad borough. In 1994, Landås borough had a population of 20,252 people.
