= Holy Cross Church, Bergen =

Church in Vestland, Norway

Holy Cross Church
- Korskirken
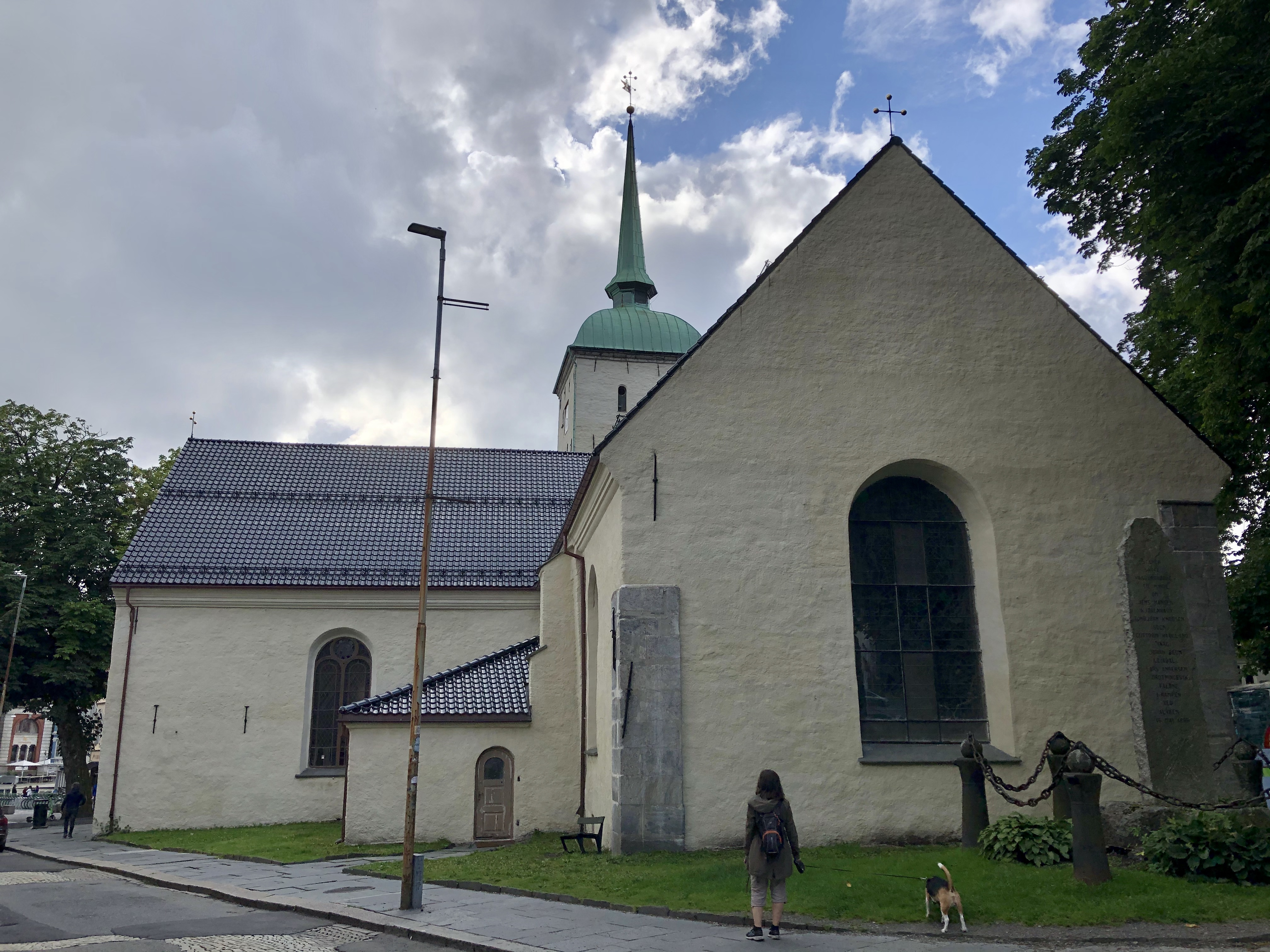
- The church in 2020
- Holy Cross Church
- 60°23′42″N 5°19′40″E
- Location: Bergen, Vestland
- Country: Norway
- Denomination: Church of Norway
- Previous denomination: Catholic Church
- Churchmanship: Evangelical Lutheran

History
- Status: Special parish church
- Founded: c. 1150
- Consecrated: c. 1150

Architecture
- Functional status: Active
- Architectural type: Cruciform
- Completed: c. 1150 (876 years ago)

Specifications
- Capacity: 600
- Materials: Stone

Administration
- Diocese: Bjørgvin bispedømme
- Deanery: Bergen domprosti
- Parish: Bergen domkirke
- Norwegian Cultural Heritage Site
- Type: Church
- Status: Automatically protected
- ID: 84827

Holy Cross Church (Norwegian: Korskirken) is a special parish church in Bergen Municipality in Vestland county, Norway. It is situated in the centre of the city of Bergen, just east of the head of the Vågen bay. The church is located at the intersection of the streets Kong Oscars gate and Nedre Korskirkeallmenningen. It is one of the churches for the Bergen domprosti parish which is part of the Bergen domprosti (arch-deanery) in the Diocese of Bjørgvin. The large stone church was built in a cruciform design around the year 1150 using plans drawn up by an unknown architect. The church seats about 600 people.

== History ==
The oldest part of the church dates back to the second half of the 12th century. The first church on the site was built around the year 1150. Holy Cross Church was first mentioned in Sverris saga from 1185. At the time of construction, the church was situated on the shore of Vågen, probably marking the southern border of settlement in Bergen.

The name refers to the True Cross (and not to its cruciform plan), and is rendered in English as "Holy Cross Church" or "Church of the Cross". This is because it was, as one of only a handful Norwegian churches, in possession of a relic from the True Cross. This relic was later stolen by the Danish king, along with several other relics from all over the country, during the Reformation.

Holy Cross Church was damaged in the fires of 1198, 1248, 1413, 1582, 1623, 1640 and 1702; the church originally had two towers, but one was destroyed in the 1582 fire and never rebuilt. It was originally built with straight rectangular plan. The church got its cruciform plan when transepts were added around 1615-1623.

In 1814, this church served as an election church (Norwegian: valgkirke). Together with more than 300 other parish churches across Norway, it was a polling station for elections to the 1814 Norwegian Constituent Assembly which wrote the Constitution of Norway. This was Norway's first national elections. Each church parish was a constituency that elected people called "electors" who later met together in each county to elect the representatives for the assembly that was to meet at Eidsvoll Manor later that year.

The church was a parish church for Holy Cross Church parish in central Bergen from 1320 until 2002. In 2002, several urban parishes in central Bergen were merged to form the "Bergen domkirke" parish. At the same time, Holy Cross Church ceased to be a regular parish church. It was given over to the Church City Mission (Kirkens Bymisjon), and is now a special church in the urban parish. The church is an "open church" that is staffed every day so that people can experience silence or participate in the lighting of candles, conversation, community, attending church services, or listening to music. The Church City Mission focuses a lot on social work among the urban neighborhood as well as religious outreach.

== Gallery ==
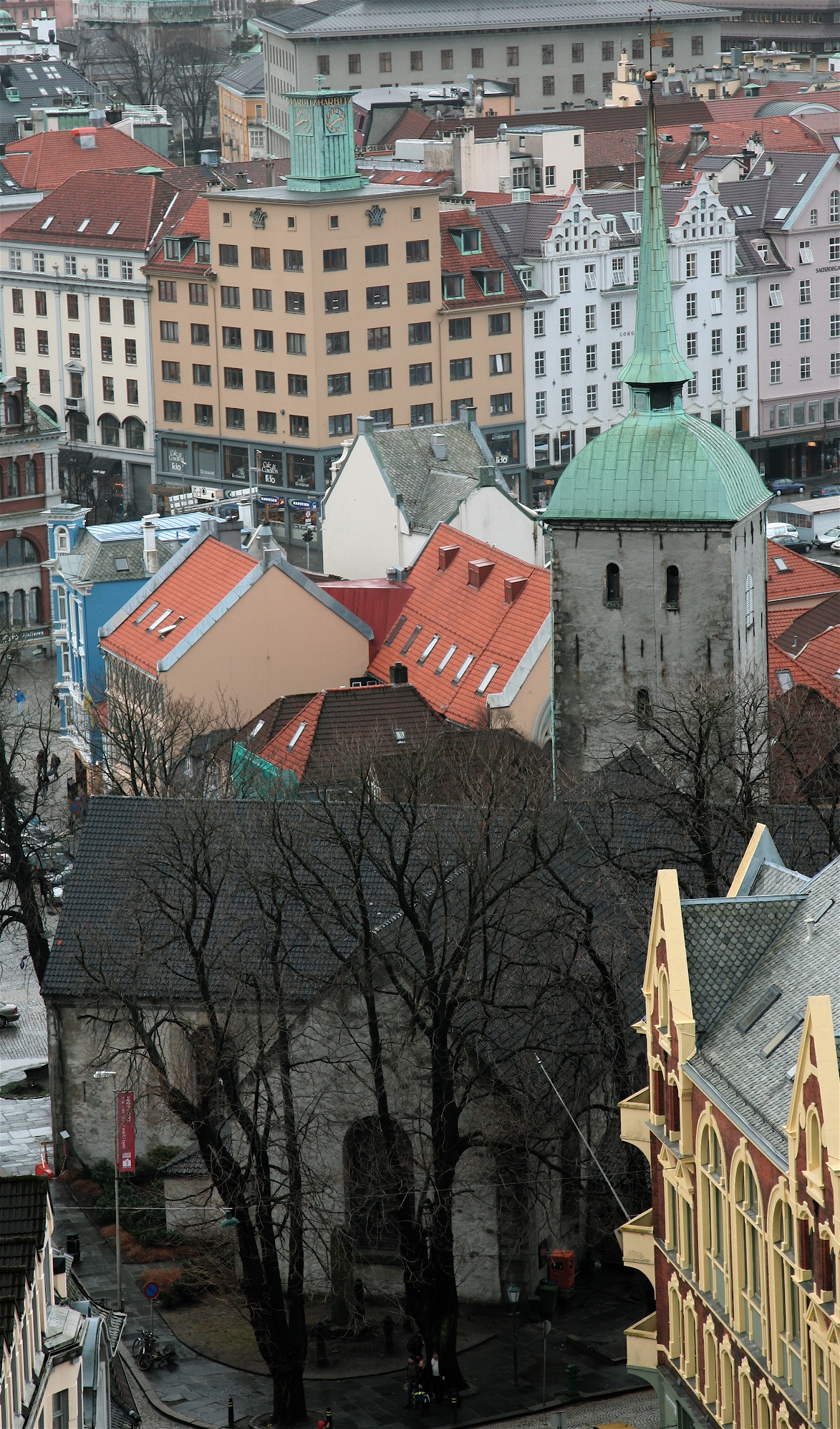
Aerial view in 2007

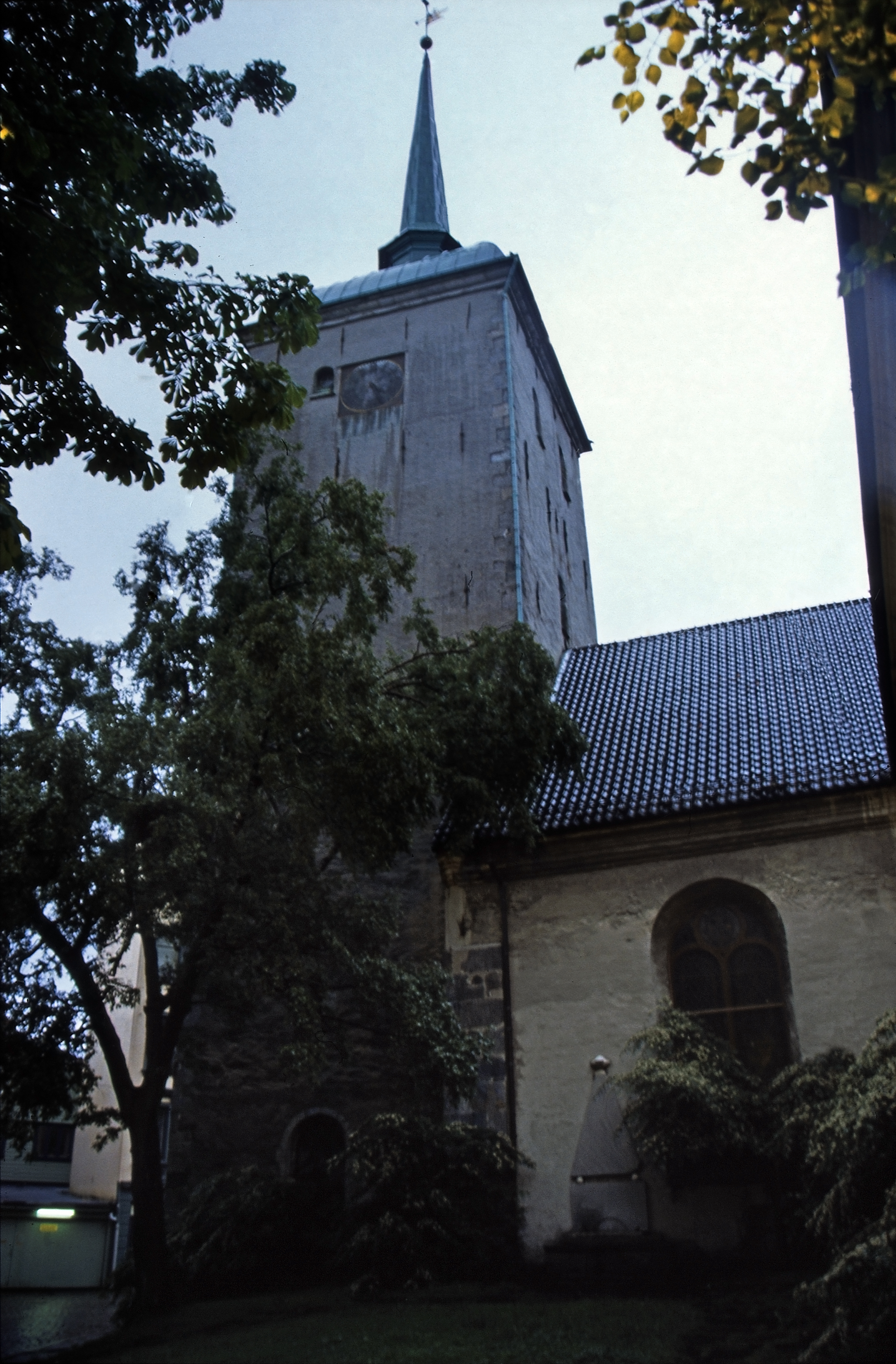
Holy Cross Church Tower

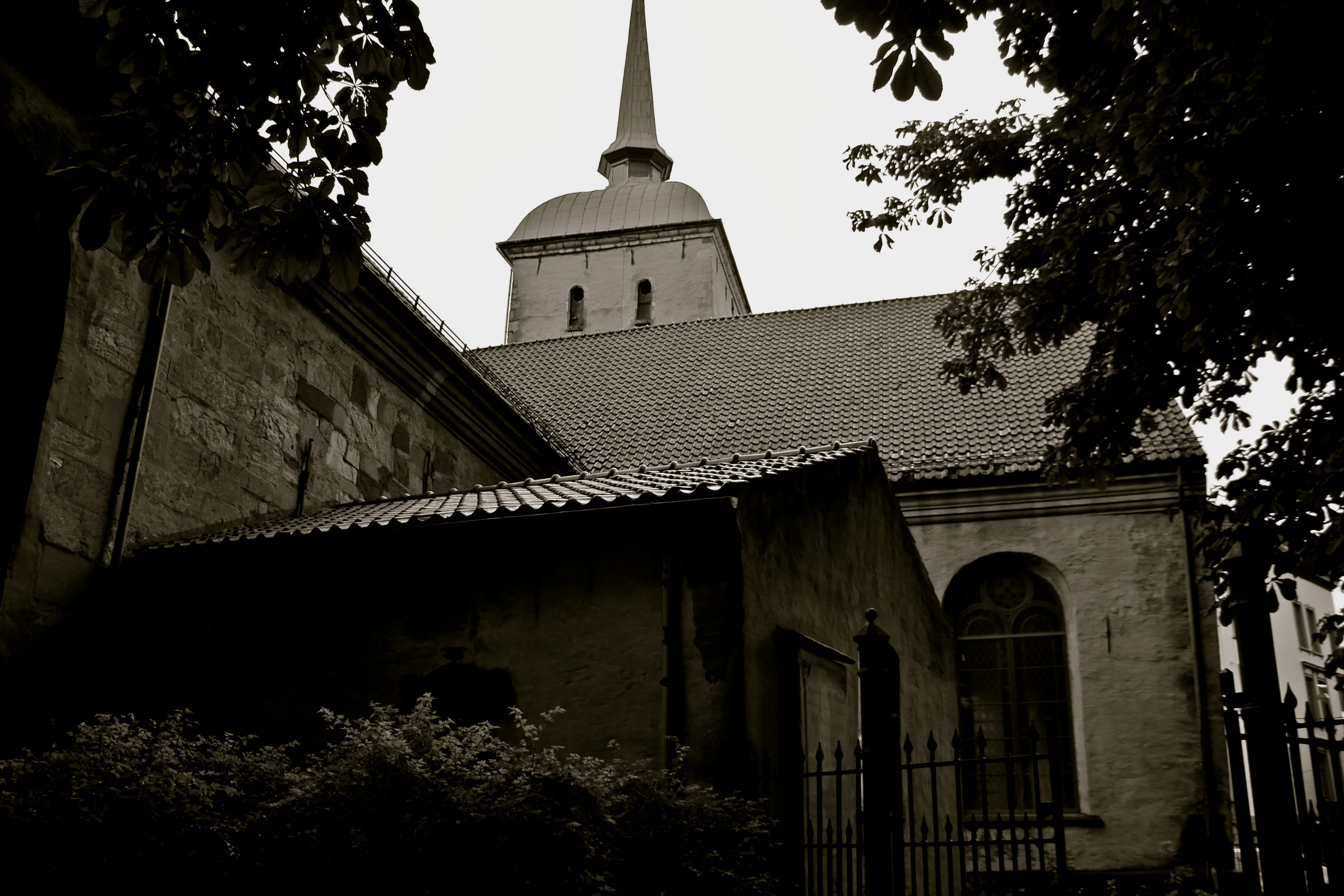
Holy Cross Church Side View

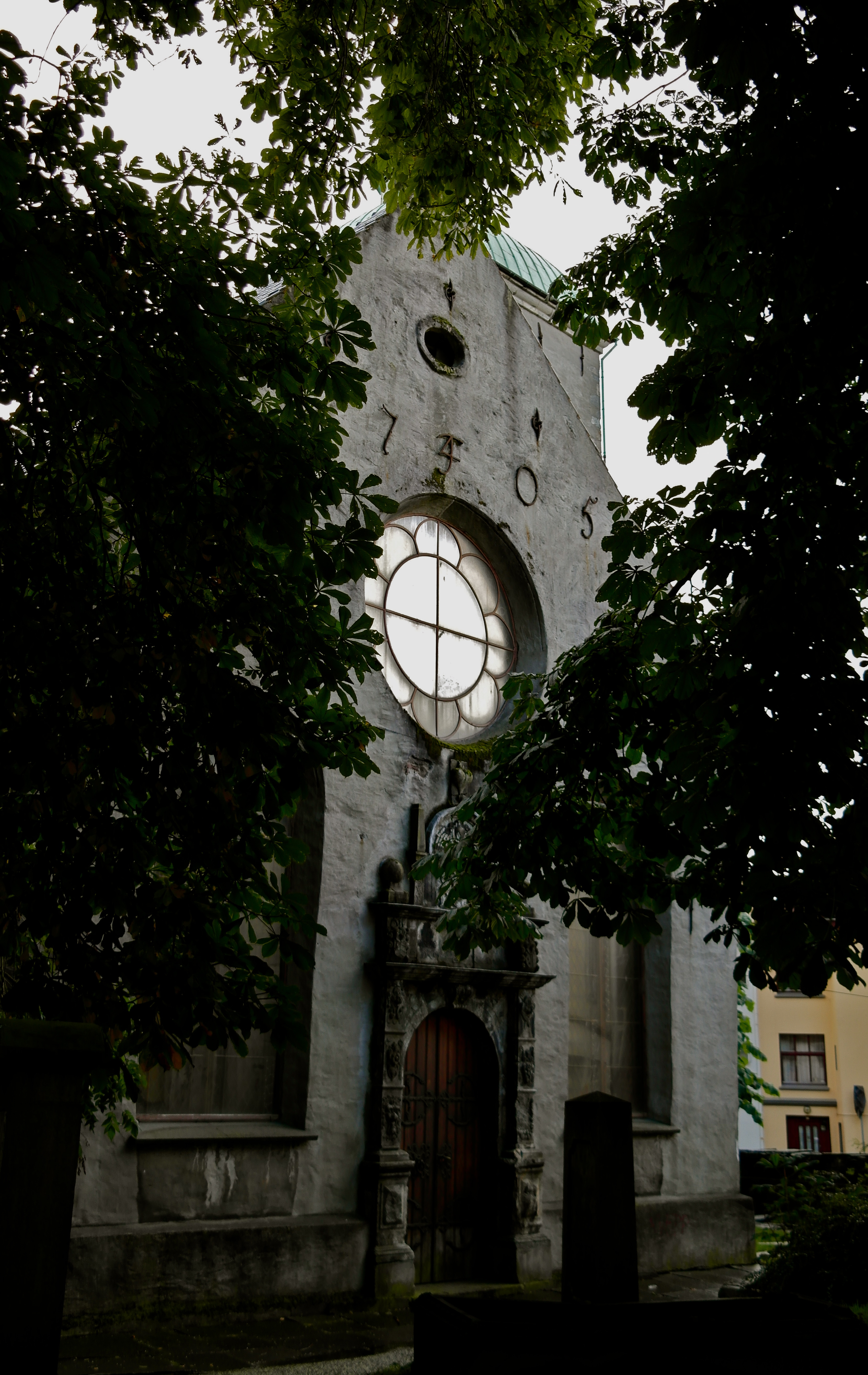
Holy Cross Church Entrance

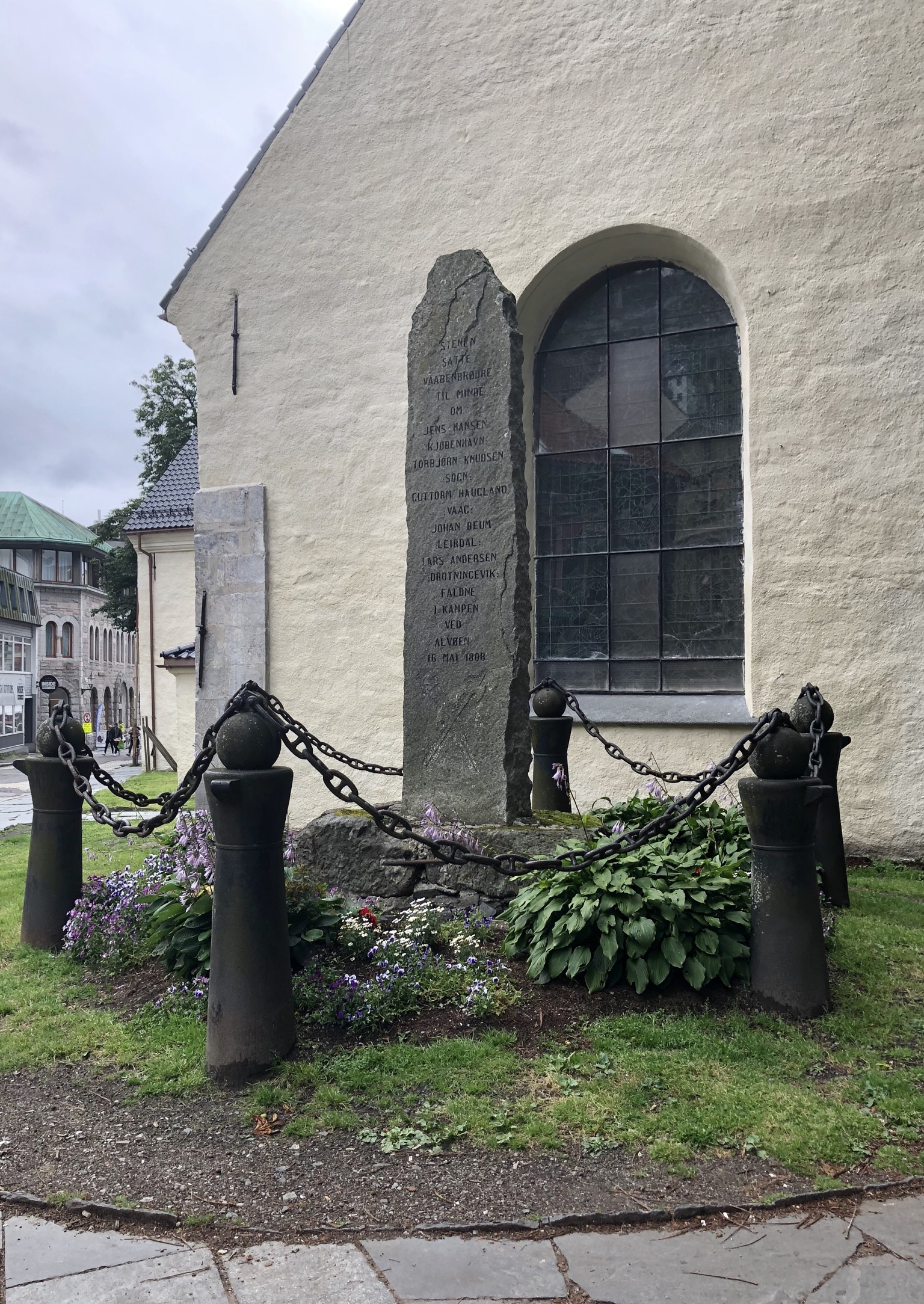

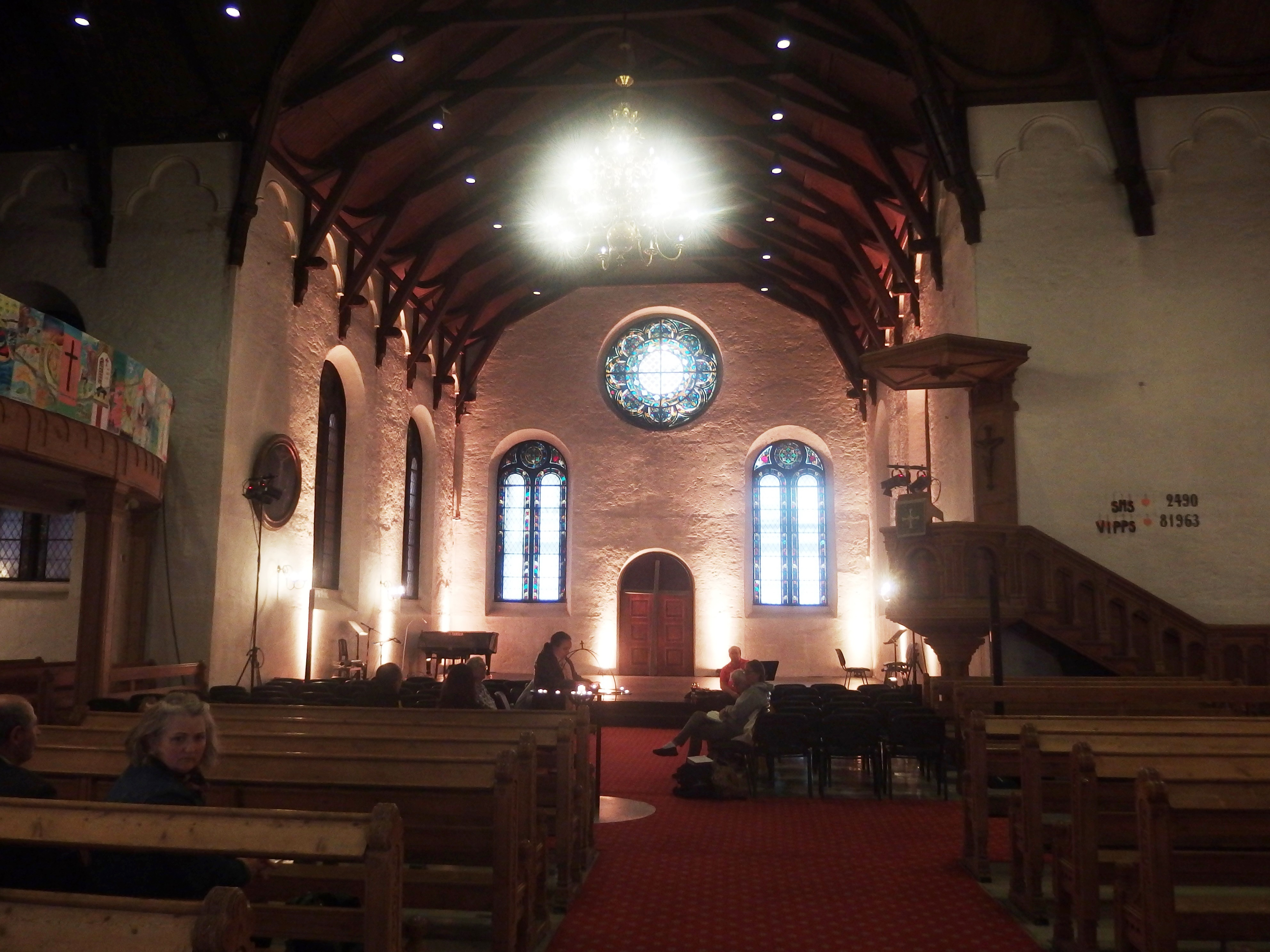
Interior view

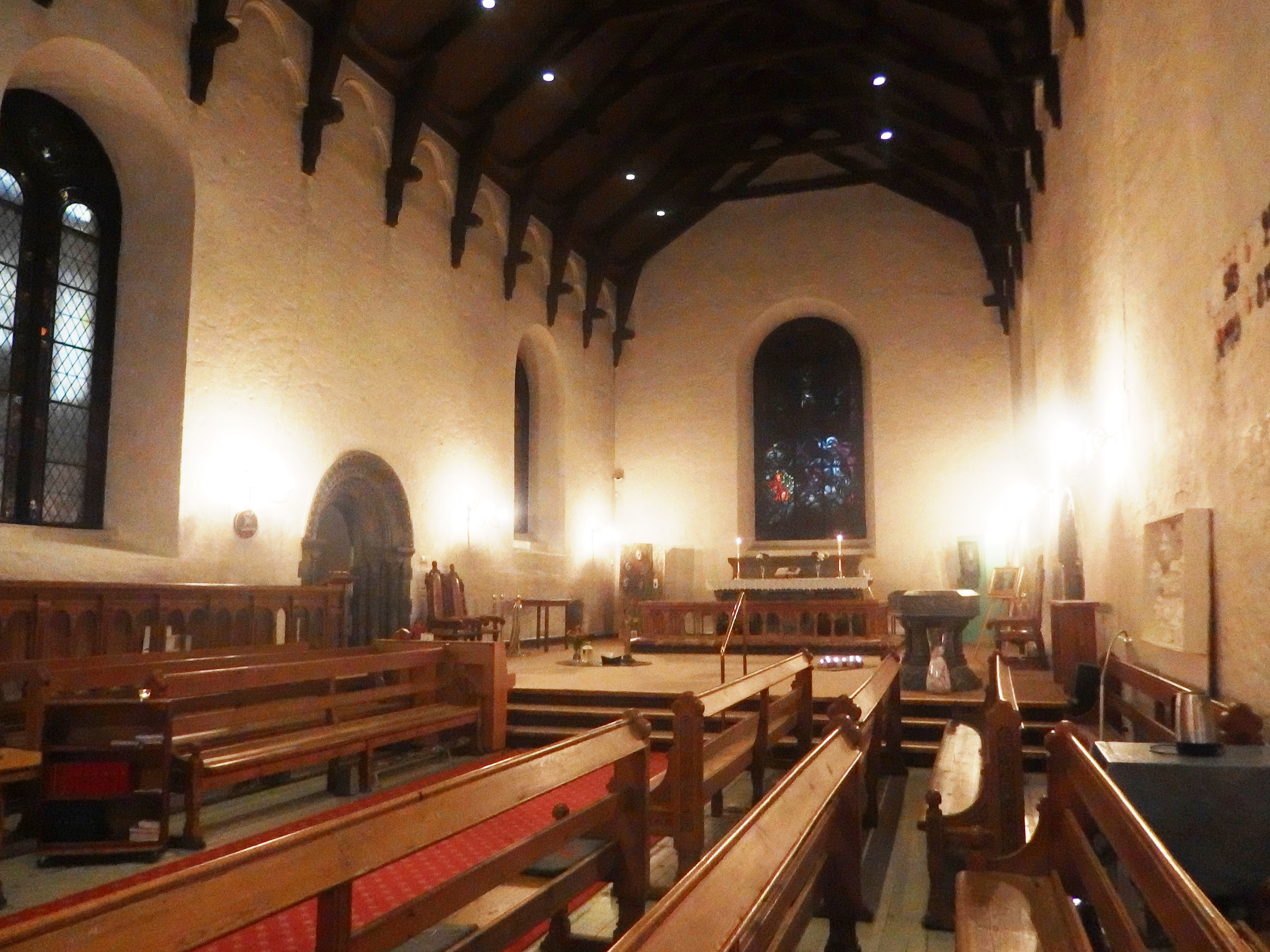
Interior view

== See also ==
- List of churches in Bjørgvin
