= Nonneseter Abbey, Bergen =

Coordinates: 60°23′23.93″N 5°19′57.13″E

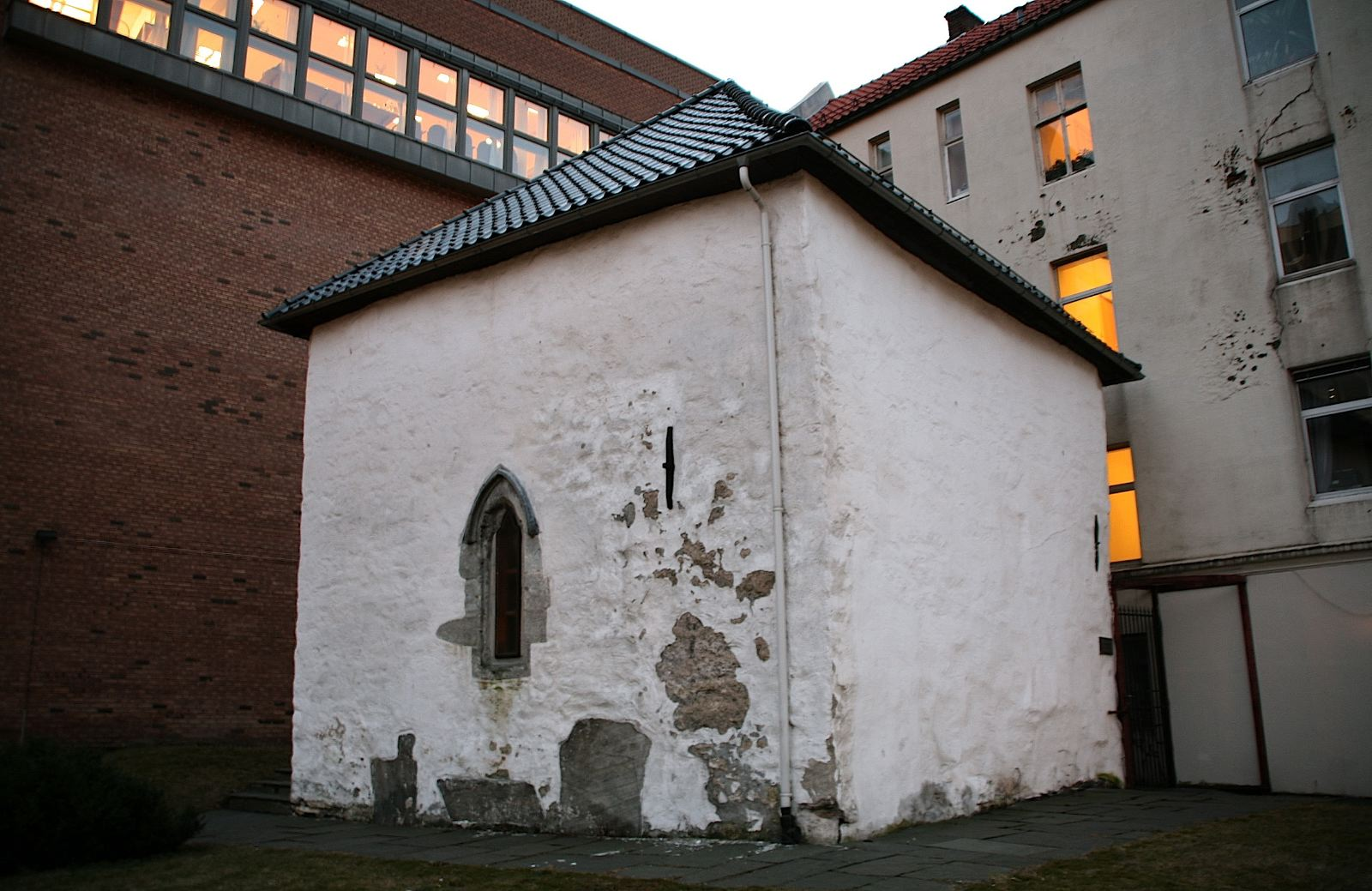
Nonneseter Chapel, Bergen, formerly a choir chapel of Nonneseter Abbey church

Nonneseter Abbey (Norwegian: Nonneseter kloster) was a Cistercian nunnery in Bergen, Norway. A small part of the former abbey church remains in use as a chapel, the Nonneseter kapell ("Nonneseter Chapel").

== History ==
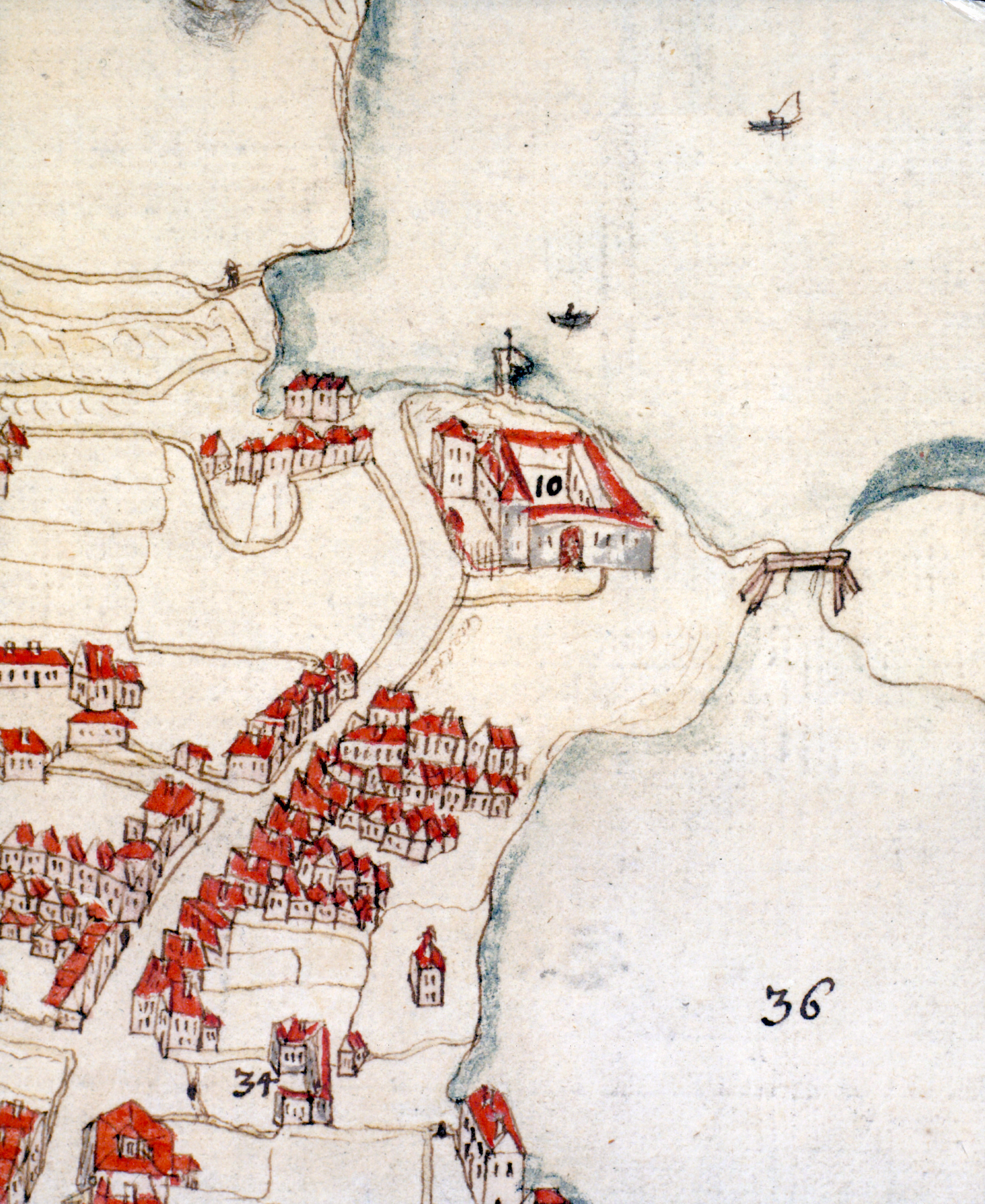
Prospect over Bergen made in 1740 shows Lungegården, built on the foundations of Nonneseter Abbey

Nonneseter Abbey is first recorded by name in 1262, but was certainly founded many years earlier, possibly in about 1150. It was dedicated to the Virgin Mary. The nuns apparently belonged to the Cistercian Order, although this is not confirmed until as late as 1494.

It was a prestigious establishment, and several members of the royal family entered the convent. The nuns elected their Abbess themselves, and the Bishop had no right to interfere except if there was a contested election. Few abbesses are known, but an abbess named Cecilia was elected in 1326. It was evidently one of the biggest convents in Norway; in 1320, the convent had 35 nuns, which was a high number even internationally. It was the richest female convent in Norway, and also richer than many of the male convents: the richest convent in Norway was Munkeliv Abbey, which had an income of 2500 lauper, with Nonneseter Abbey of Bergen not far behind at 1700 lauper.

The Nonneseter was severely devastated by the Black Death in Norway in 1349. It appears that the Nonneseter Abbey experienced a downturn after the Black death and during the 15th century. Munkeliv Abbey was devastated by fire in 1455, which caused a crisis for that abbey, which was the most important in Norway. On an unknown date, king Christian I transferred the income, estates and land of Nonneseter to the Munkeliv Abbey to compensate them for the 1455 fire. This was done since the Nonneseter Abbey was almost empty, and the few nuns which remained were moved to an unnamed convent of their order. The buildings were transferred to the Hospital Brothers of St. Anthony. It is not known when this happened, only that it must have been during the reign of Christian I (1481-1513). Tradition claims that in 1507, the nuns were ejected for immoral and unseemly behaviour. However, since it is known that the field directly outside of the convent was transformed to a shooting field by the Bishop of Bergen in 1497, the nuns must have disappeared between 1481 and 1497.

The nunnery underwent secularisation in 1528, and the premises were converted into a private fortified residence, under the name of Lungegården, by the new proprietor, Vincens Lunge.

A hospital run by the nuns at Nonneseter Abbey was first documented in 1411. It seems probable that this was the forerunner of St. Jørgen's Hospital (Sankt Jørgens Hospital) which was later associated with the research and treatment of leprosy by Daniel Cornelius Danielssen.

== Site and buildings ==
The abbey was located on a promontory on the north bank of the Lillestrømmen, a stream which once connected two bodies of water, Store Lungegårdsvannet and Lille Lungegårdsvannet, approximately in the area of the present Kaigaten. The surviving buildings were mostly destroyed by a fire in 1891, and of the monastic buildings there remains nothing to be seen. Of the abbey church there survived the base of the west tower and the Nonneseter Chapel, originally the south chapel off the choir, which after the fire were acquired in 1891 by the Society for the Preservation of Ancient Norwegian Monuments.

The single storey remaining of the west tower, the Tårnfoten ("tower foot"), measures 8.6 metres square. It was originally clad with dressed stone. In the west wall is a portal with a round arch, and in the east wall another, which would have connected to the body of the church. It is now used as a memorial chapel to the fallen of World War II.

The Romanesque tower foot is more old-fashioned in style than the body of the main church apparently was, indicating the possibility that it could have belonged to an older structure predating the arrival of the Cistercians with their characteristic building style. The church lay to the east of the tower. The original building was quite small, but seems to have been extended eastwards in the later 13th century with a new choir and choir chapels; it had a single aisle. The graveyard was to the north of the church, and the monastic buildings to the south, but there are too few remains of them to establish the exact layout. The site was archaeologically excavated in 1872 and again in 1892.

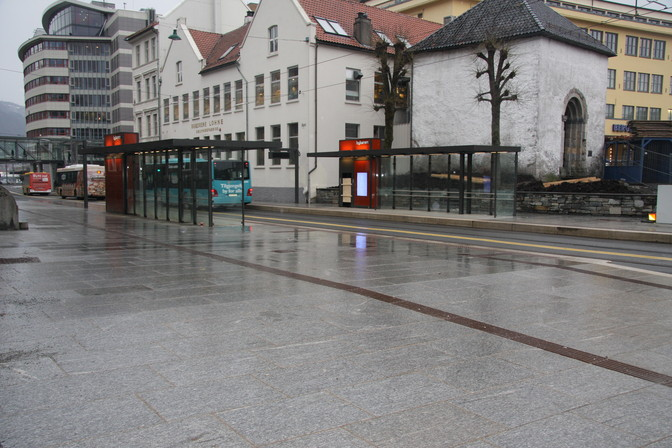
Nonneseteren station on the Bergen Light Rail

== Nonneseter Chapel ==
The Nonneseter Chapel (Nonneseter kapell) at Kaigaten 3 is believed to have been one of the choir chapels. It measures about 8 metres by 7 metres, and contains a vaulted ceiling and Gothic arched windows. It dates from around 1250, which seems to be when the church was extended. Between 1951 and 1989 it was used as a church for deaf persons. It is now used for various purposes, including as a concert hall. It is situated adjacent to the Nonneseteren station of the Bergen Light Rail and near the Bergen Public Library.

== Sources ==
- Norske kloster i middelalderen: Nonneseter kloster, Bergen (in Norwegian)
- Histos.no: Nonneseter kloster (in Norwegian)
- Kunsthistorie: Images
