= St George's Church, Bergen =

Church in Vestland, Norway

St. George's Church
- St. Jørgen kirke
- Hospitalkirken
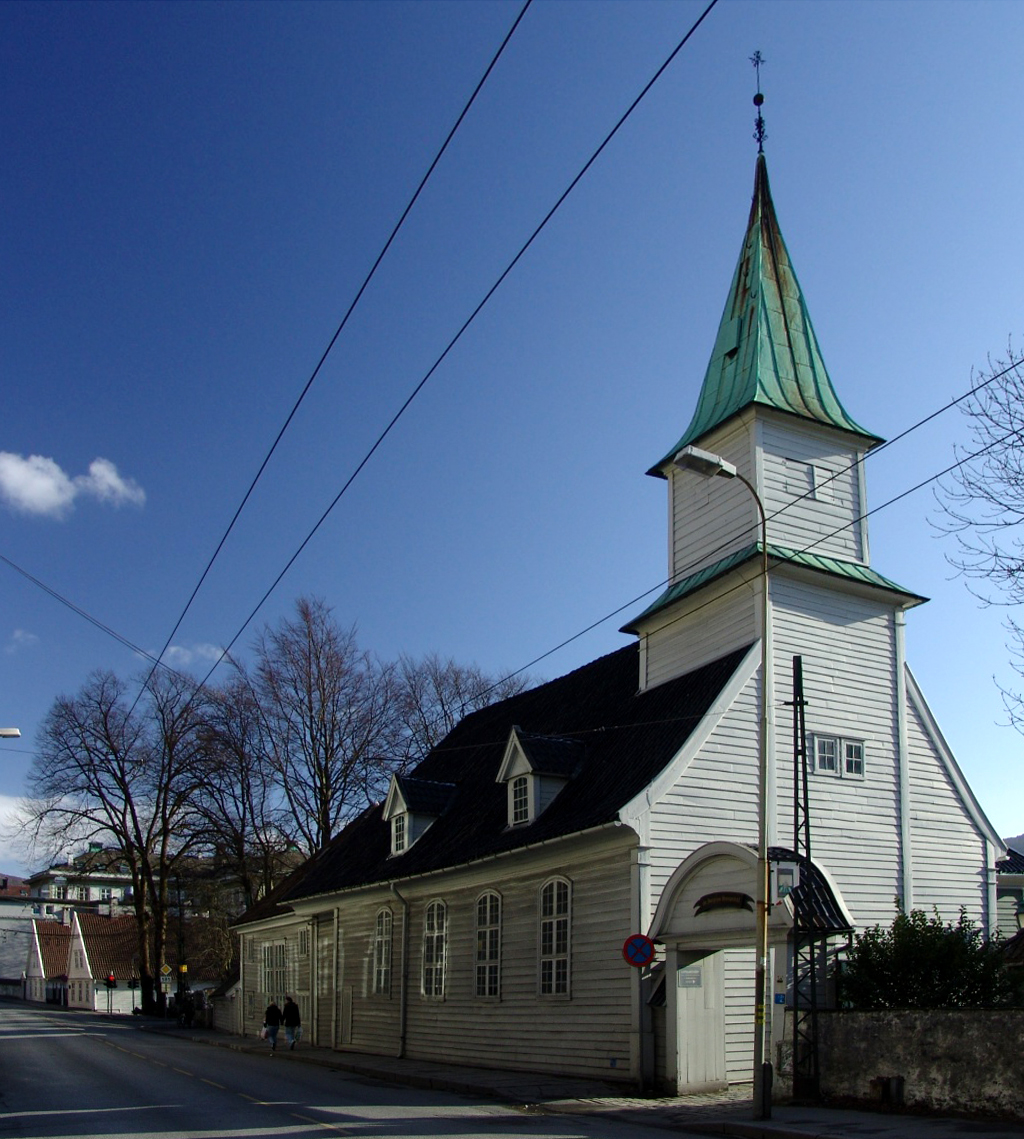
- View of the church
- St. George's Church
- 60°23′30″N 5°19′58″E
- Location: Bergen, Vestland
- Country: Norway
- Denomination: Church of Norway
- Previous denomination: Catholic Church
- Churchmanship: Evangelical Lutheran

History
- Status: Former parish church
- Founded: 15th century
- Consecrated: 1706

Architecture
- Functional status: Inactive
- Architectural type: Cruciform
- Style: Baroque
- Completed: 1706 (320 years ago)

Specifications
- Capacity: 125
- Materials: Wood

Administration
- Diocese: Bjørgvin bispedømme
- Deanery: Bergen domprosti
- Parish: Bergen domkirke
- Norwegian Cultural Heritage Site
- Type: Church
- Status: Automatically protected
- ID: 87162

St George's Church, Bergen (Norwegian: Sankt Jørgen kirke) is a historic church of the Church of Norway in Bergen Municipality in Vestland county, Norway. This is also the site of the Leprosy Museum (Lepramuseet). Although it is no longer regularly used, it is one of the churches in the Bergen domprosti parish which is part of the Bergen domprosti (arch-deanery) in the Diocese of Bjørgvin. The green, wooden church was built in a cruciform design in 1706 using plans drawn up by an unknown architect. The church seats about 125 people.

== Overview ==
The complex is located on Kong Oscars gate, close to the central railway station, in the central part of the city of Bergen. The entire site, including the church, is now open to the public as a Leprosy museum which has been open to the public since 1970. The church remains consecrated and is kept in good order and condition. The church is no longer used as a regular parish church, but it is still used twice a month for English language worship services as well as occasional Swedish language services.

== History ==
The church was originally the hospital chapel (Hospitalskirken) in Bergen. A leprosy hospital in Bergen was documented in 1411, and was run at that time by the nuns of Nonneseter Abbey in Bergen. It seems likely that this facility was the immediate forerunner of the hospital and church. The church initially just served the patients at the hospital, but eventually it became its own parish serving the surrounding parts of Årstad. The parish was also the base for chaplains at the nearby city prison, poor house, and home for widows.

The church burned down with the rest of the hospital in 1640. The church was rebuilt again after the Bergen citywide fire in 1702 when most of the city was burned to ashes. The church building was largely designed in late Baroque style. The present appearance of the church results from a major reconstruction of 1789–90.

In 1814, this church served as an election church (Norwegian: valgkirke). Together with more than 300 other parish churches across Norway, it was a polling station for elections to the 1814 Norwegian Constituent Assembly which wrote the Constitution of Norway. This was Norway's first national elections. Each church parish was a constituency that elected people called "electors" who later met together in each county to elect the representatives for the assembly that was to meet at Eidsvoll Manor later that year.

== Media gallery ==
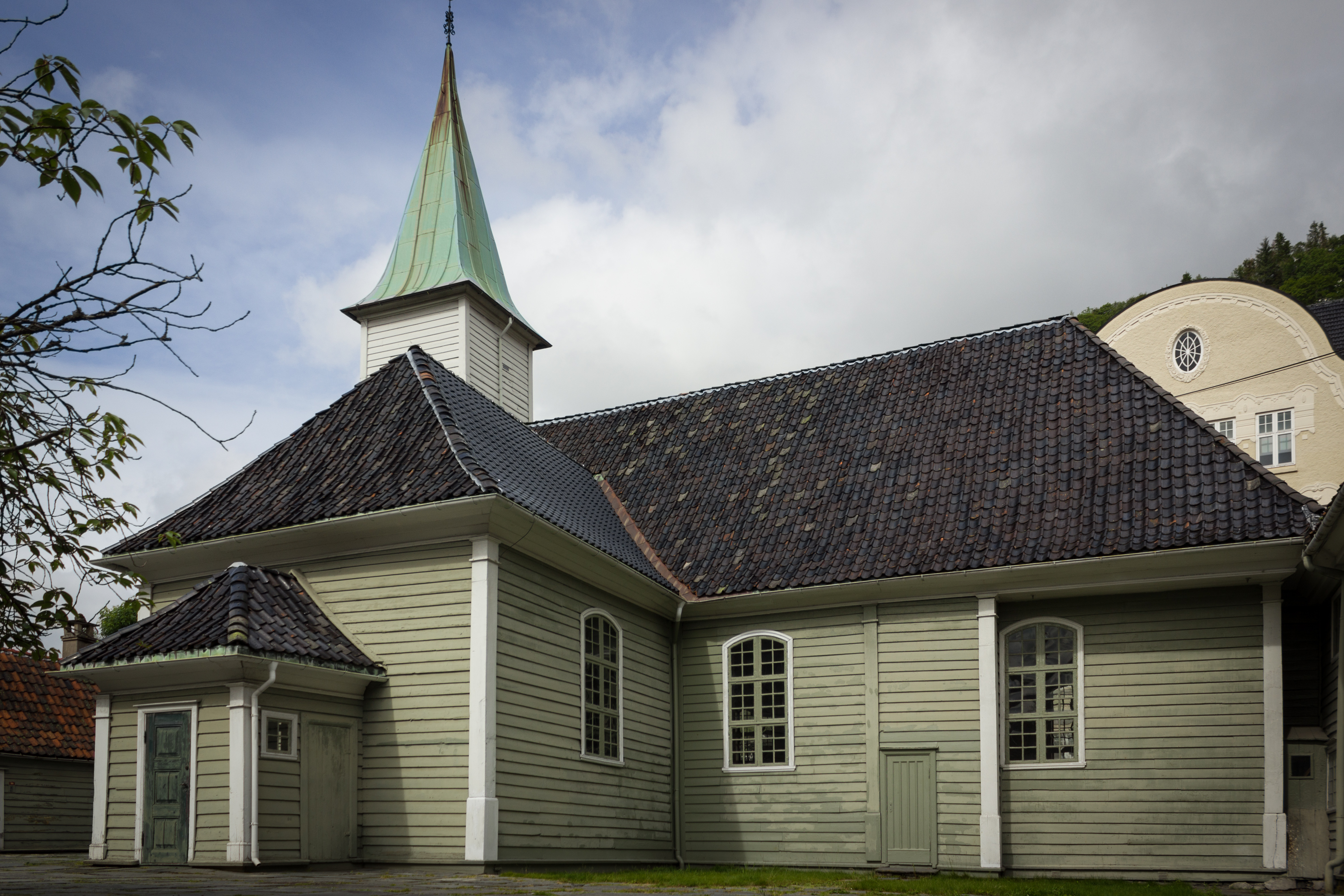
St Jørgens

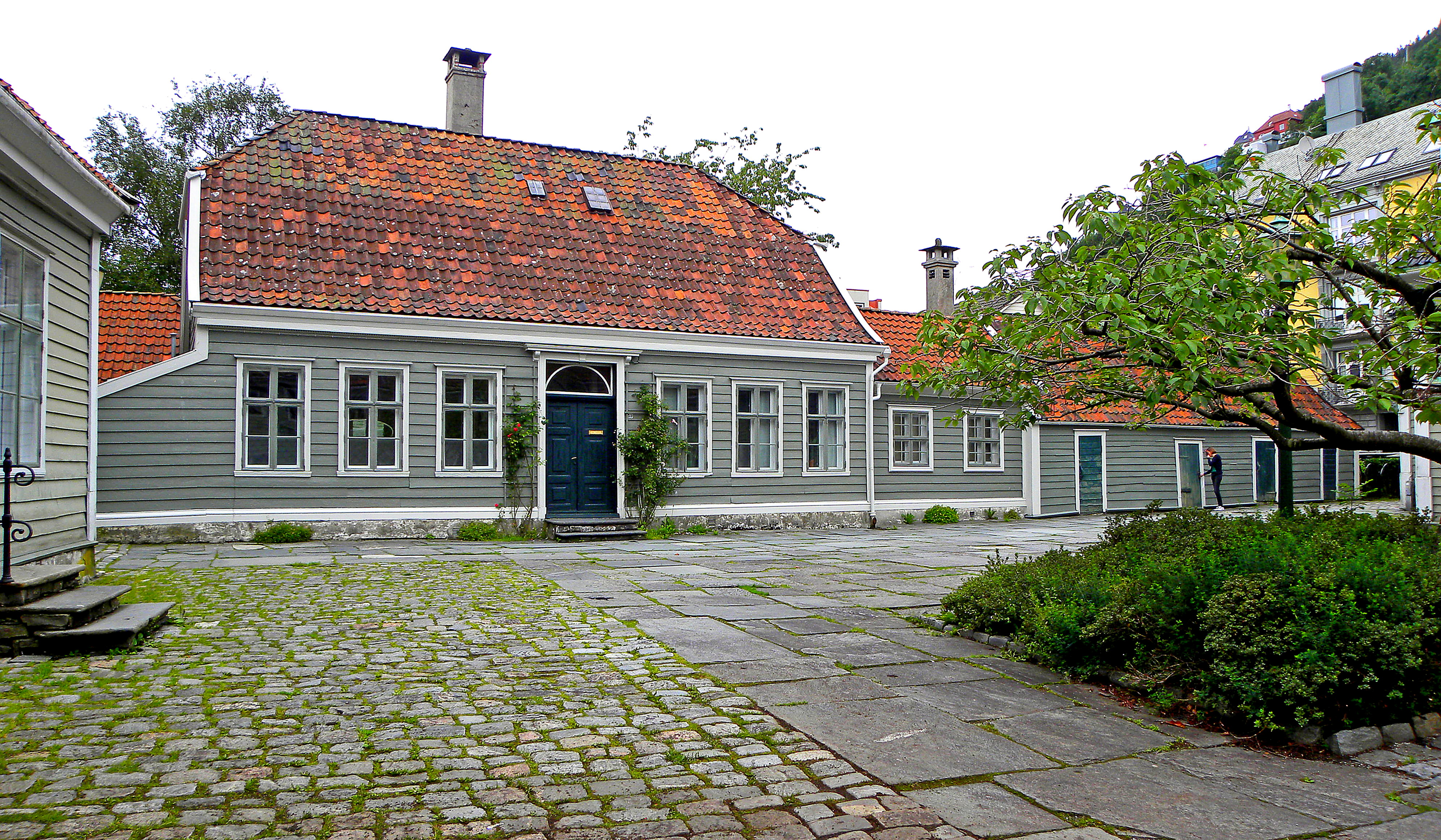
St Jørgens courtyard

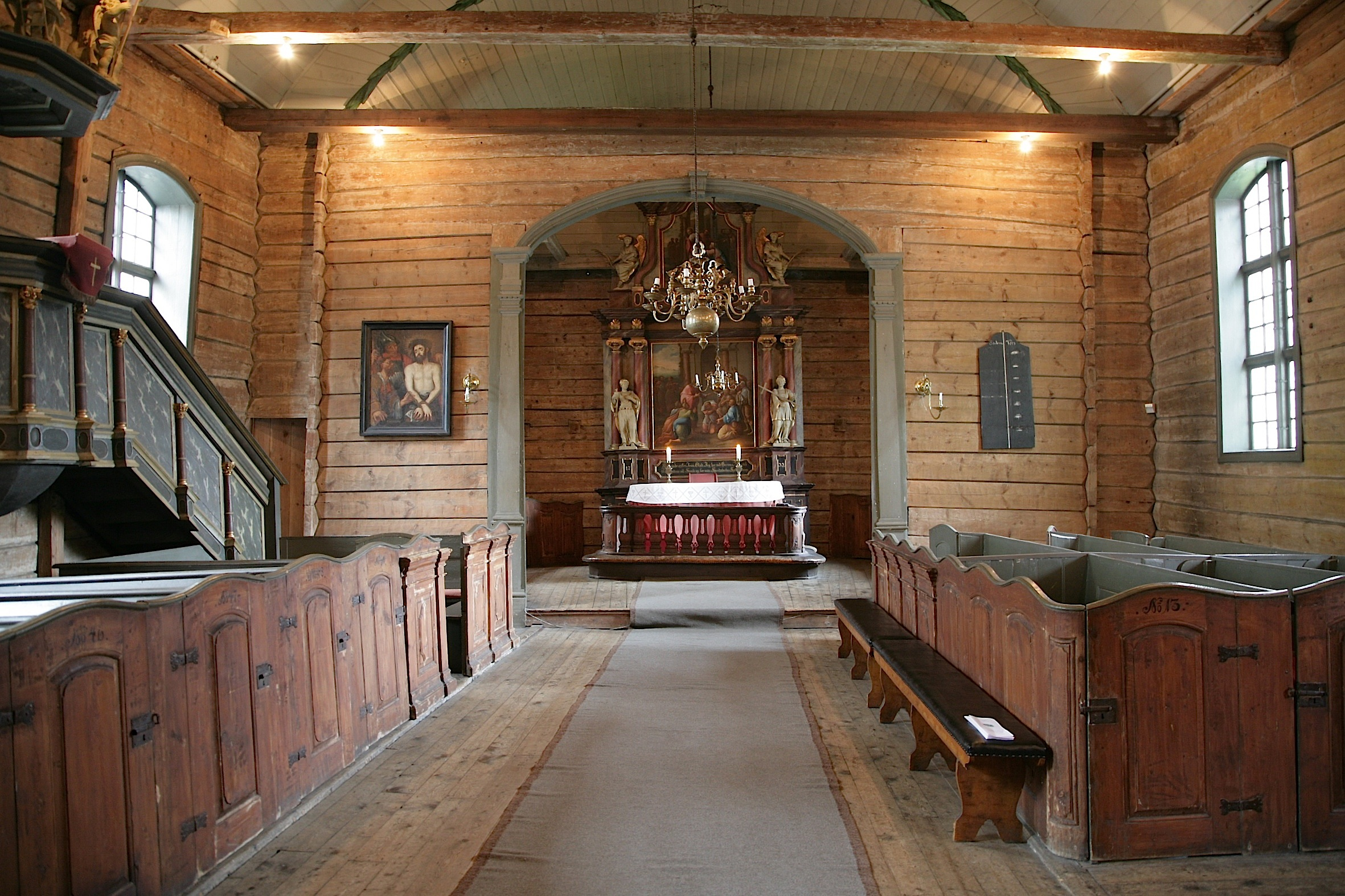
St Jørgens sanctuary

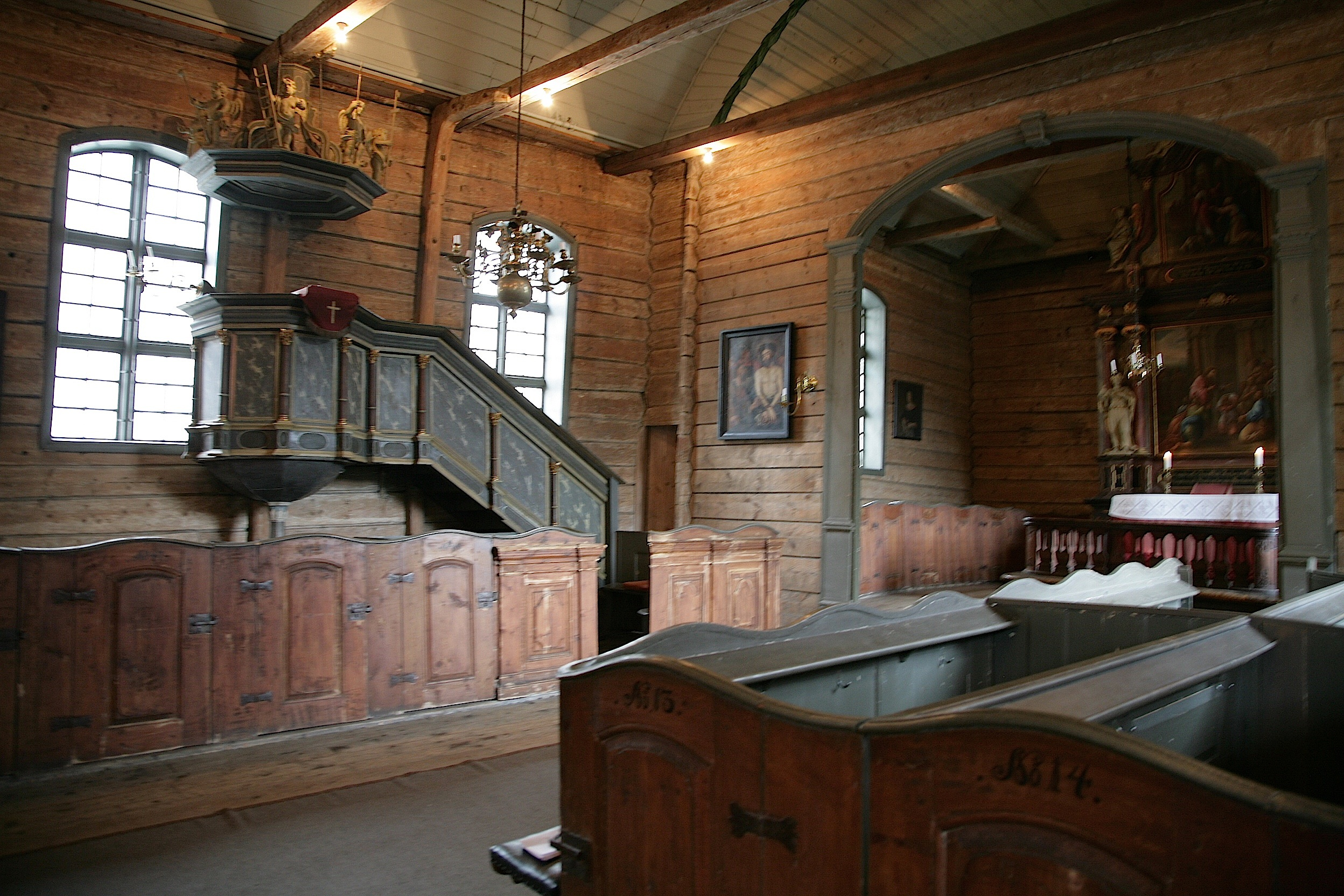
St Jørgens pulpit

== See also ==
- Daniel Cornelius Danielssen
- List of churches in Bjørgvin
