= Kong Oscars gate, Bergen =

Street in Bergen, Norway

Coordinates: 60.3926°N 5.3317°E

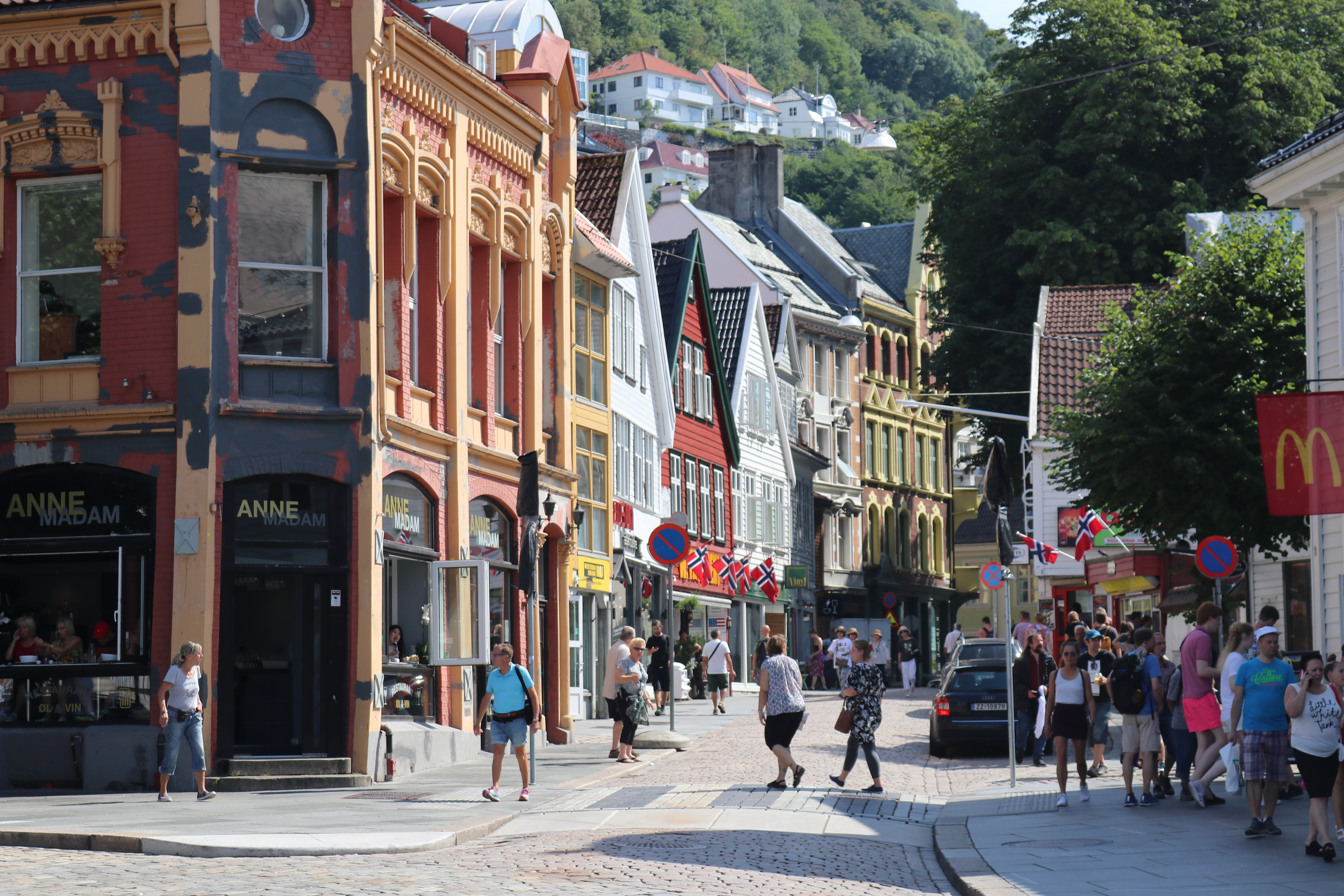
Kong Oscars gate

Kong Oscars gate is a street in the city centre of Bergen, Norway. It runs from Stadsporten, northwestwards to Bryggesporden and Vetrlidsallmenning by the bay of Vågen. The westernmost part of Kong Oscars gate is among the oldest streets in Bergen. The street was named in 1857 after king Oscar I of Sweden, who would reign over Norway and Sweden until 1859. It is a one-way road between Domkirkeplassen and its northwestern end, and otherwise a two-way road. Norwegian national road is assigned to Kong Oscars gate between its southeastern end at Stadsporten and Nygaten, which it then follows. Kong Oscars gate is approximately 0.8 km long.

== History ==
Prior to the current name's being assigned in 1857, the street had a variety of names, sometimes inspired by the businesses of the street. The northern part has been known as "Sutarestretet" (literally "the shoemaker street"), and later "Skredderstretet" ("the tailor street"), when the tailors moved into the area, and "Adelgade" in the 18th century. The southern part (south of Nygaten/Heggebakken) has been known as "Hospitalsgaden" ("the hospital street"), "St. Jacobs gade" ("Street of St. Jacob"), "Christies gade", "Portgaden", and "Domkirkegaden".

== Buildings ==
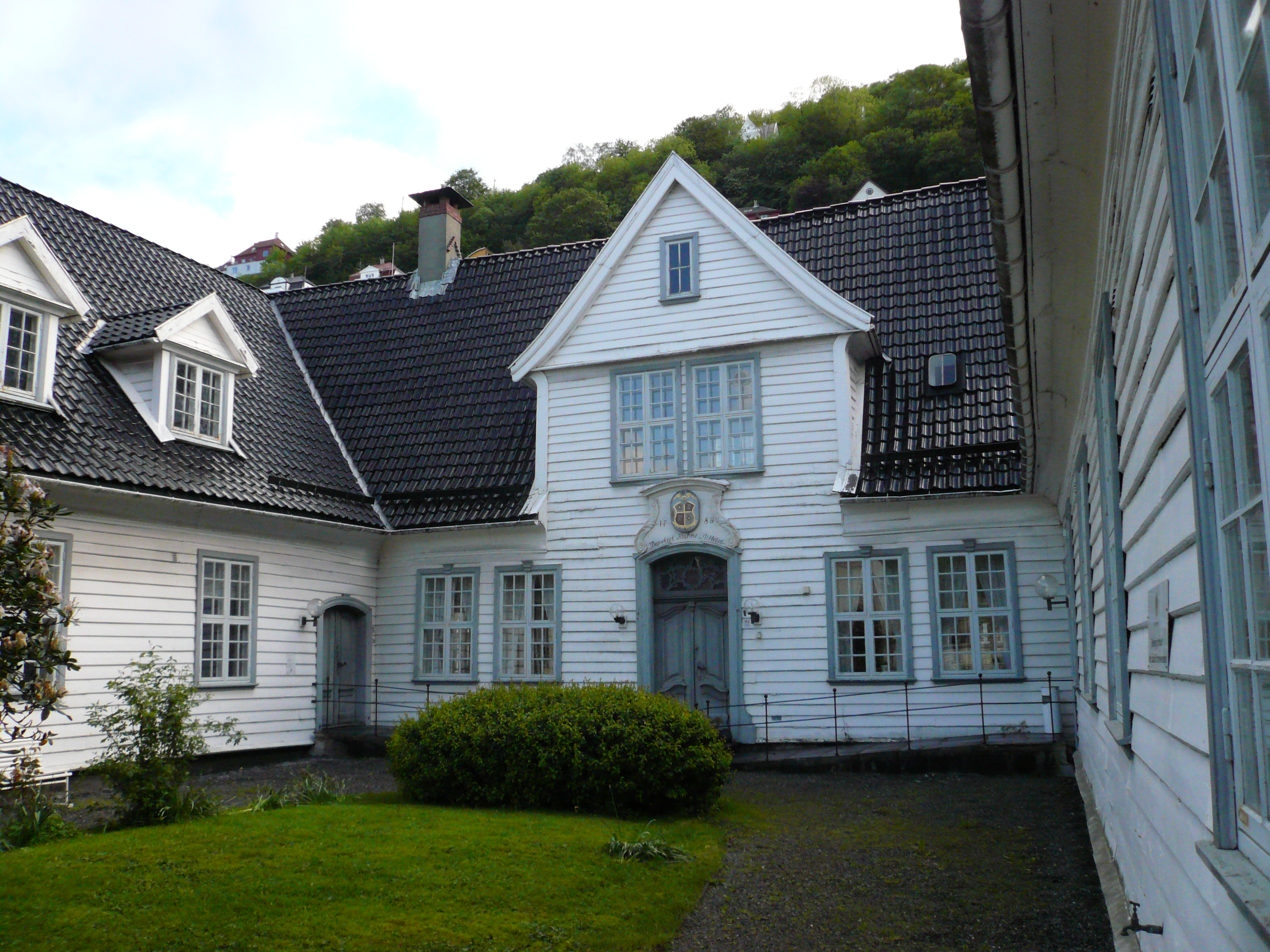
Danckert Krohn's Foundation

A number of significant buildings are located along Kong Oscars gate. The street's south-eastern end is at Stadsporten, the old city gate of Bergen. The intersection between Kong Oscars gate and Strømgaten, further north, is the location of Zander Kaae's Foundation (Zander Kaaes stiftelse, Kong Oscars gate 67), built in the 18th century for a charity and now the rooms are rented to students. On the west side of the intersection is St. Jørgens hospital, an 18th-century leprosy hospital and today a leprosy museum. Directly north of the museum is Danckert Krohn's Foundation, another charity for the elderly, built in the late 18th century.

Further up the street, by the intersection with Nygaten and Heggebakken, is Bergen katedralskole, one of the three upper secondary schools in Kong Oscars gate. Danielsen videregående skole is located directly opposite Bergen katedralskole on the west side of the street. Bergen Cathedral, one of Bergen's medieval churches, is located by the intersection with Lille Øvregate and Domkirkeplassen on the east side. Tanks videregående skole is located north of the intersection with Domkirkegaten and Lille Øvregate on the west side. Holy Cross Church, another medieval church, is situated by Nedre Korskirkeallmenningen near the north-western end of the street.
