= Camille-Melchior Gibert =

French dermatologist (1797–1866)

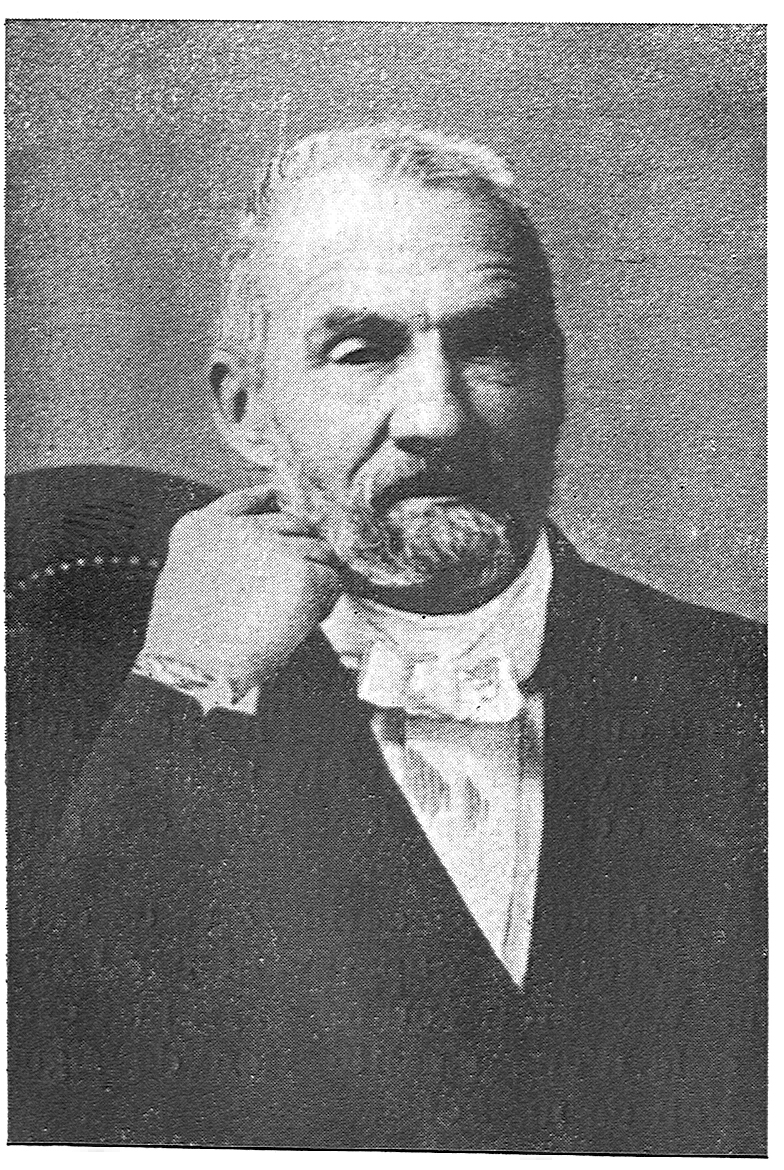
Camille-Melchior Gibert

Camille-Melchior Gibert (18 September 1797 – 30 July 1866) was a French dermatologist who was a native of Paris.

He studied medicine in Paris, where in 1818–19 he served as an interne to Laurent-Théodore Biett at the Hôpital Saint-Louis. In 1822, he received his medical doctorate, and in 1826, he obtained his agrégation. From 1836, he was a physician at the Hôpital Lourcine, and from 1840 to 1863, was associated with the Hôpital Saint-Louis. In 1847, he became a member of the Académie de médecine. He died during the 1866 Paris cholera epidemic.

Gibert contributed to the Medical section of the Encyclopédie Méthodique.

Gibert is remembered for providing the first accurate description of a papulosquamous skin disorder that he named pityriasis rosea. Historically, this condition was also referred to as "Gibert disease". His best written work on skin diseases was a book called "Traité pratique des maladies spéciales de la peau" (second edition, 1840).

In 1859, with Dr. Joseph-Alexandre Auzias-Turenne (1812–1870), Gibert took part in controversial experiments in which three volunteers were inoculated with secondary syphilis.
