= Daniel Cornelius Danielssen =

Norwegian dermatologist (1815–1894)

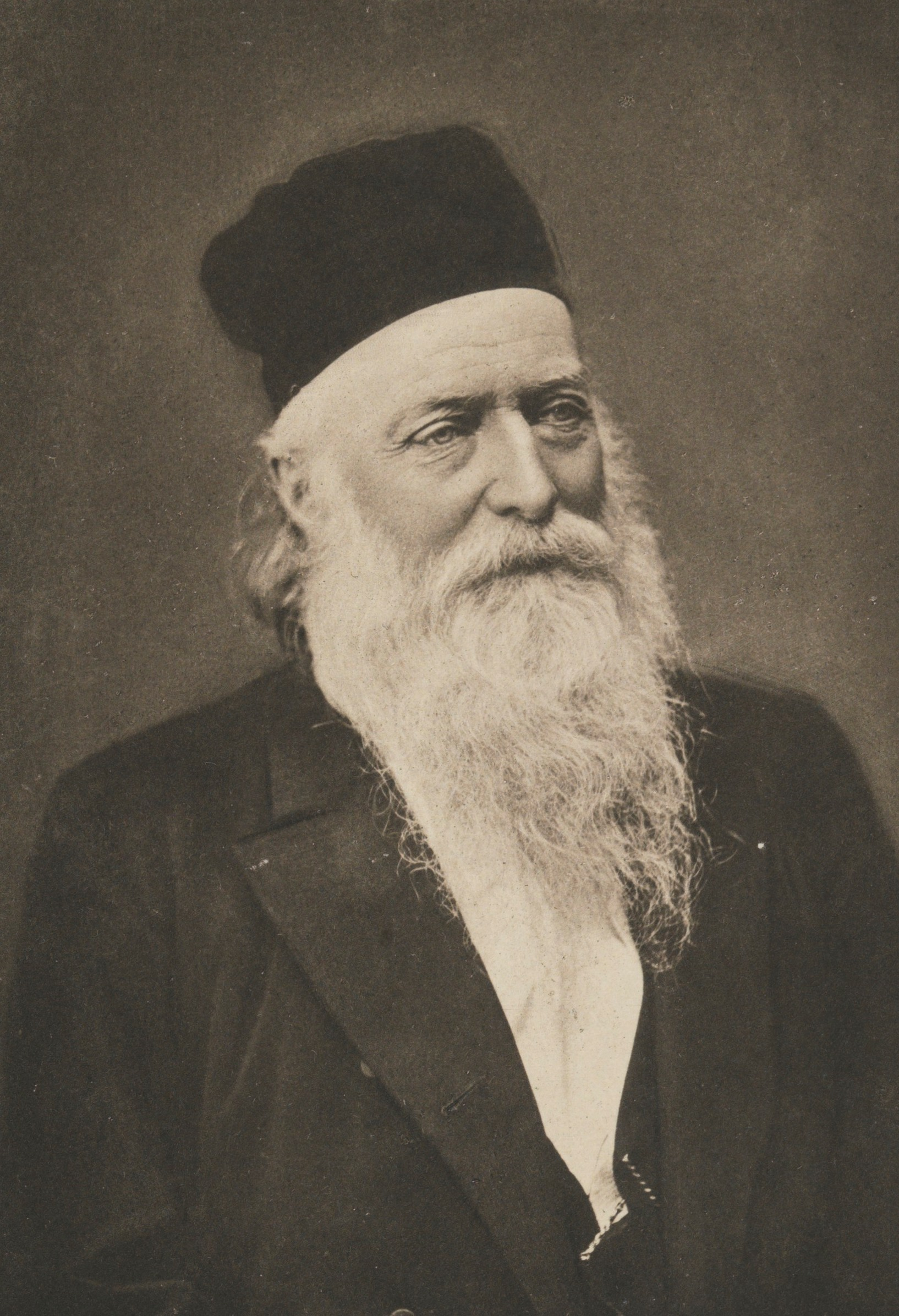
Daniel Cornelius Danielssen

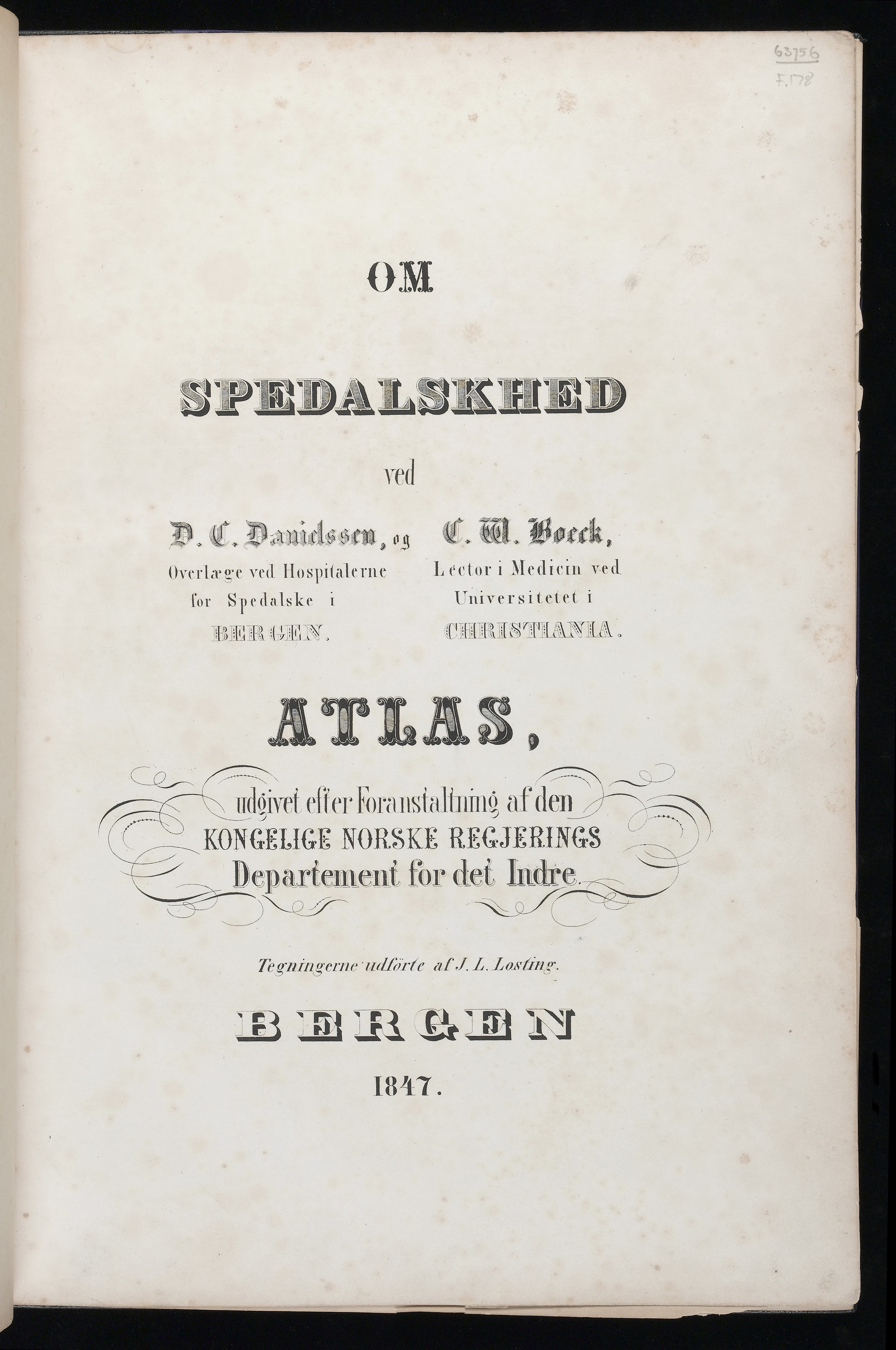
Title page of Om Spedalskhed

Daniel Cornelius Danielssen (4 July 1815 – 13 July 1894) was a Norwegian physician. He was most noted for his research regarding the causes and treatment of leprosy.

== Biography ==
Danielssen was from Bergen, Norway. Dating from 1839, he was associated with St. Jørgens Hospital (Sankt Jørgens Hospital) in Bergen. He later worked with Gerhard Armauer Hansen, discovering the bacteria causing leprosy, and made Bergen a world centre of lepra research in the middle of the nineteenth century.

With dermatologist Carl Wilhelm Boeck, he was co-author of an acclaimed study on lepra titled Om Spedalskhed (1847). In October 1849, he was named head physician of research at Lungegaard Hospital (Lungegaardshospitalet). In 1859, German pathologist Rudolf Virchow visited Danielssen in Bergen in order to study lepra.

In 1876–78 he served as a zoologist on a Norwegian expedition to northern waters, and for several years was chairman of the Society for the Advancement of Norwegian Fisheries (Selskabet for de norske Fiskeriers Fremme). Also, for a number of years, Danielssen was a representative of Bergen to the Stortinget, 1862–64, 1871–73 and 1875–76. Danielssen was a member of the Royal Swedish Academy of Sciences from 1877.

The characteristic anesthesia of the extremity affected by untreated leprosy is sometimes called "Danielssen's Sign" in his honor.

== See also ==
- Danielssen-Boeck disease
