= Joseph-Alexandre Auzias-Turenne =

French physician

Joseph-Alexandre Auzias-Turenne, born on March 1, 1812, in Pertuis (Vaucluse) and died on May 27, 1870, in Paris, was a French medical doctor.

== Biography ==
He advocated the preventive inoculation of syphilis, on the model of the variolation, and dedicated his life to this idea that posterity has not ratified.

In 1859, with Camille-Melchior Gibert, he took part in a controversial experiment in which human patients were deliberately infected with syphilis in order to prove the infectious nature of secondary syphilis.

He supported a theory of immunization as depletion, in the subject, of a substance necessary for the infectious agent. This theory, although adopted by Louis Pasteur, has not been ratified by posterity either.

He advocated the use of microbial antagonisms for therapeutic purposes (cure of diseases like favus, elephantiasis, lupus and cancer). This idea was also defended by Pasteur and, this time, ratified by posterity, but was not implemented neither by Auzias-Turenne, nor by Pasteur.

== Publications ==
- Jenner et la vaccine, Paris : Imprimerie Divry et cie., 1862
- Questions, 1° Des causes des scrofules : 2° Des luxations, des causes qui les déterminent et de leur mécanisme : 3° Quelles sont les diverses substances qui entrent dans la composition du cervelet ? Quelle est leur situation respective et dans quelles propositions concourent-elles à la formation de l'organe ? : 4° Quelles sont les préparations dont l'aconit fait la base. Les décrire et les comparer entre elles, Paris : Imp. Rignoux, 1841
- Théorie ou mécanisme de la migraine, Paris, Plon, 1849
- La variole et la vaccine ne sont pas produites par un même principe virulent, Paris, 1850
- De la syphilisation et de la contagion des accidents secondaires de la syphilis : communications à l'Académie Nationale de Médecine, par MM. Ricord, Bégin, Malgaigne; avec les communications de MM. Auzias-Turenne et C. Sperino à l'Académie des Sciences de Paris et à l'Académie de Médecine de Turin, Paris : J.-B. Baillière, 1853
- Lettre à M. le préfet de police sur la syphilisation, Paris, 1853
- Discussion sur la syphilis : Extrait des procès-verbaux de la Société médicale du Panthéon, Paris : Imprimerie de Moquet, 1856
- Correspondance syphilographique, suivi du Rapport fait par M. Gibert à l'Acad. imp. d. Méd., Paris : Leclerc, 1860
- Communication sur le traitement de la blennorragie et de la blennorrée, faite à la Société médicale du Panthéon, le 10 août 1859, Paris, L. Leclerc, 1860
- Discours sur la syphilisation..., Paris : Bailly, 1861
- De la syphilis vaccinale : Communications à l'Académie impériale de médecine, par Depaul, Suivies de mémoires sur la transmission de la syphilis par la vaccination et la vaccination animale, par A. Viennois, Paris : J.-B. Baillière et fils, 1865
- Les Virus au tribunal de l'Académie & dans la Presse, Paris : Imp. Divry, 1868
- La syphilisation, Publication de l'oeuvre du docteur Auzias-Turenne faite par les soins de ses amis. Paris, G. Baillière, 1878
- Théorie ou mécanisme de la migraine, Paris, Plon, 1849. Electronic edition online.
- Discours prononcés sur la tombe de M. Isidore Geoffroy-St-Hilaire, le 13 Octobre 1861, Henri Milne-Edwards, Paris, F. Didot

== Bibliography ==
- Burke D. S., « Joseph-Alexandre Auzias-Turenne, Louis Pasteur, and early concepts of virulence, attenuation, and vaccination », Perspectives in biology and medicine, 1996, vol. 39, n° 2, pp. 171–186.
- Dracobly, Alex. « Ethics and Experimentation on Human Subjects in Mid-Nineteenth-Century France: The Story of the 1859 Syphilis Experiments », Bulletin of the History of Medicine, vol. 77, n° 2, 2003, online.
