= Vågen, Bergen =

Bay in Bergen, Norway

Vågen
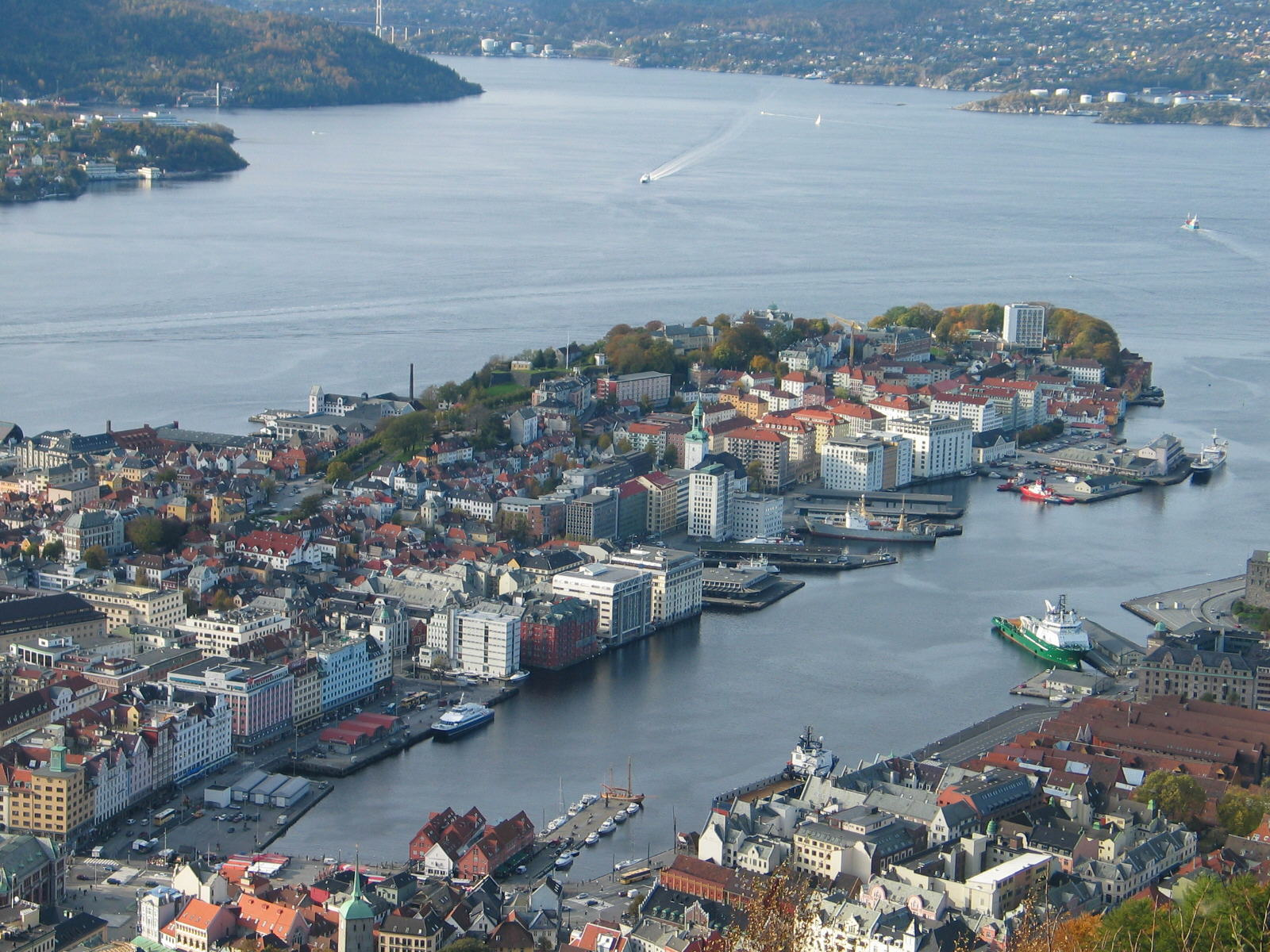
- View of Vågen photographed from Fløyen looking west
- Interactive map of Vågen
- Location: Vestland county, Norway
- Coordinates: 60.39848°N 5.31525°E
- Type: Bay
- Basin countries: Norway
- Max. length: 1,200 metres (0.7 mi)
- Settlements: Bergen

Vågen is a bay in the centre of the city of Bergen in Vestland county, Norway. It is the central harbour of the city centre, and is the center of the historical core of the city. The city of Bergen originated on the east shore of the bay, and from there it expanded to the southern and western shores over a few centuries. Today, Bergen is the second largest city in the nation.

The 1,200-metre (3,900 ft) long bay branches off the main Byfjorden. The Nordnes peninsula lies on the south side of the bay, and the Bergenhus Fortress lies on the northern shore. The Bryggen UNESCO World Heritage Site also lies along the northern shore of the bay. Bryggen includes many old buildings, some of which date back to the 11th century.

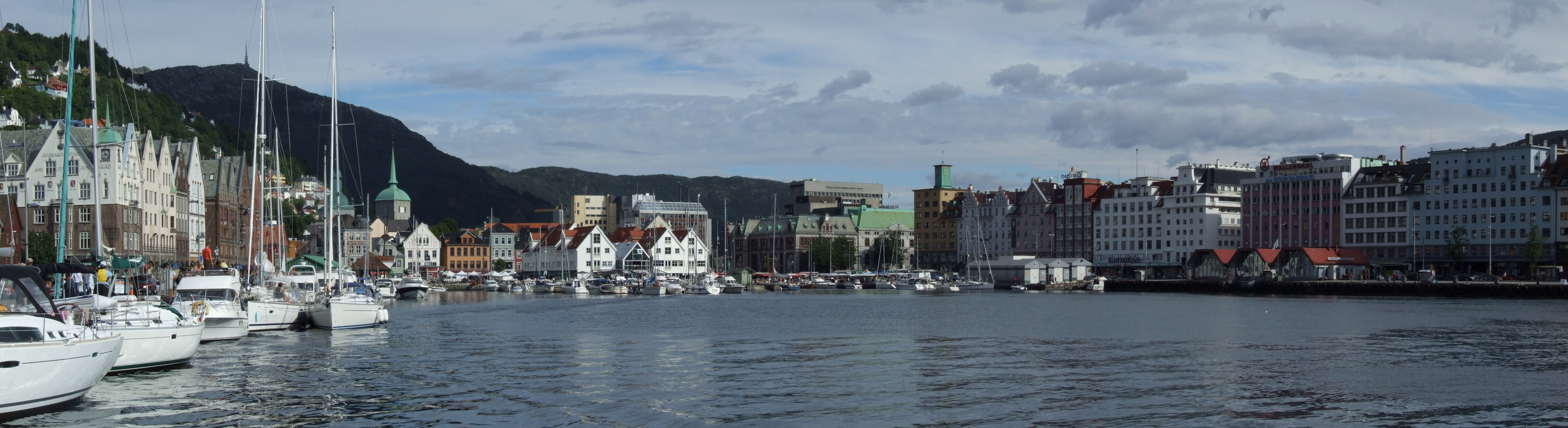
The inner part of the bay

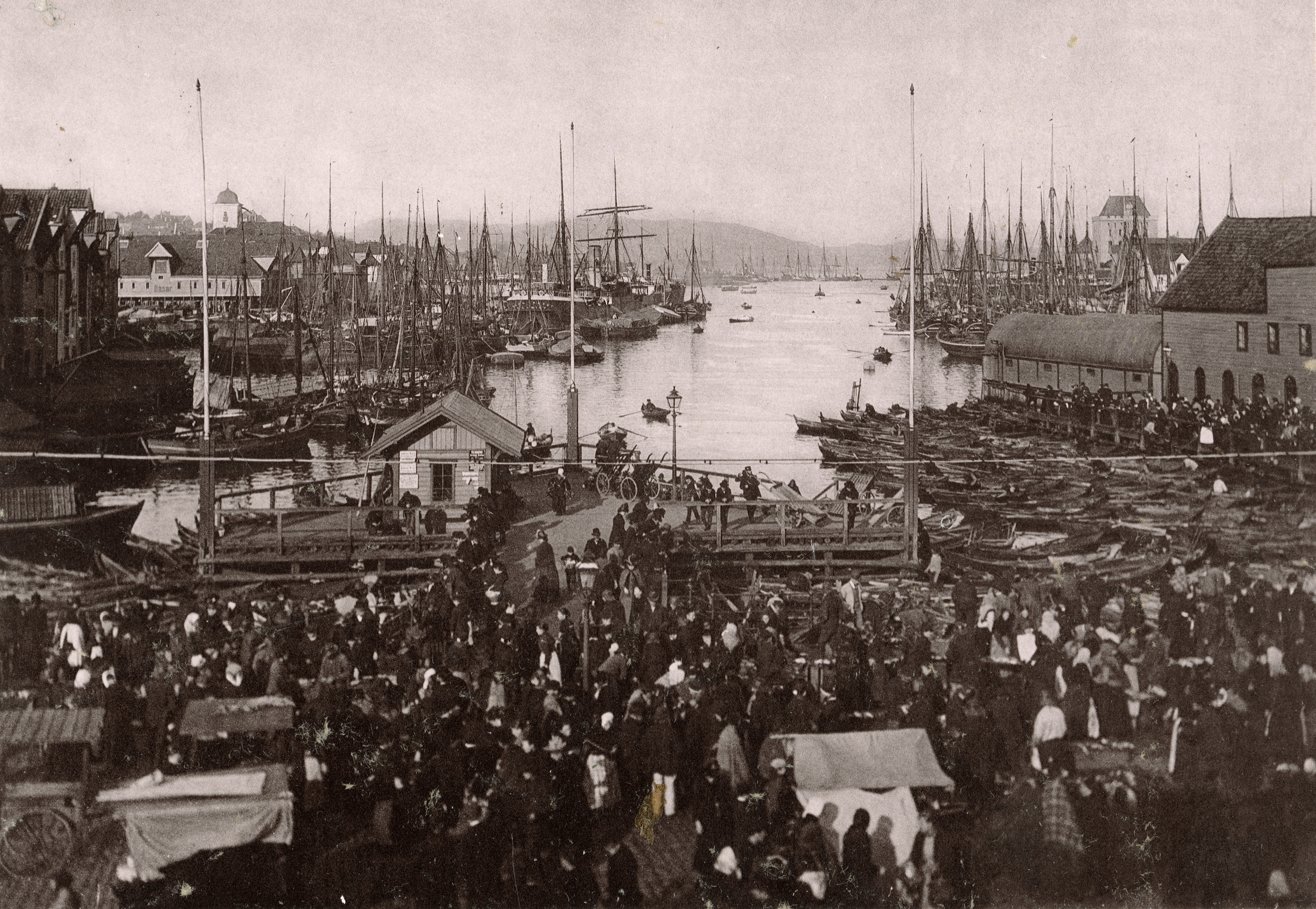
Vågen in the old days
