= Falkanger =

Falkanger is a Norwegian surname. Notable people with the surname include:

- Aage Thor Falkanger (born 1965), Norwegian judge and legal scholar
- Aage Thor Falkanger, Sr. (1902–1981), Norwegian judge
- Thor Falkanger (born 1934), Norwegian legal scholar
- Torbjørn Falkanger (1927–2013), Norwegian ski jumper
