= Fosen District Court =

District court in Trøndelag, Norway

- Fosen tingrett
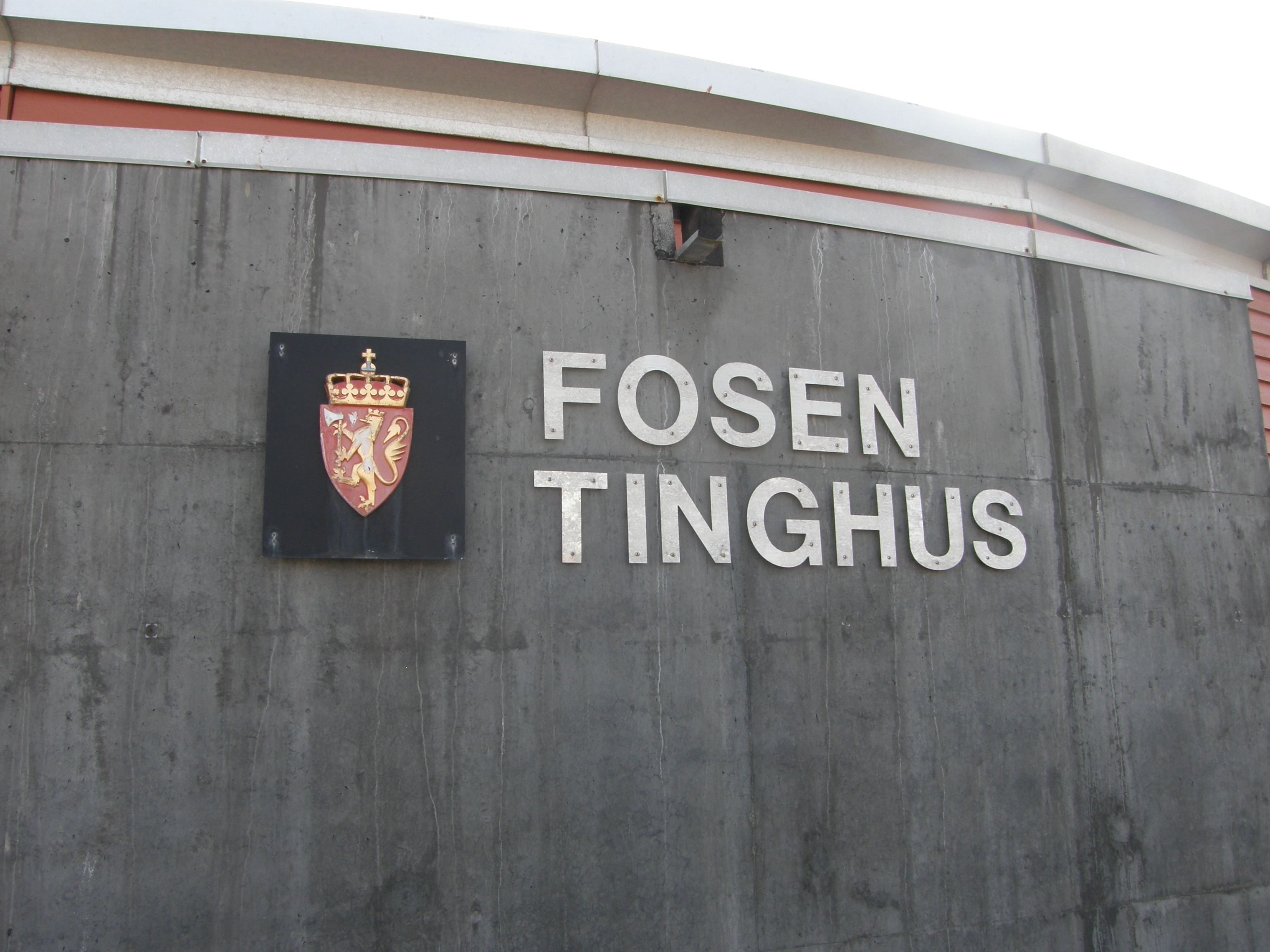
- Fosen Tinghus, the sight of the Fosen District Court

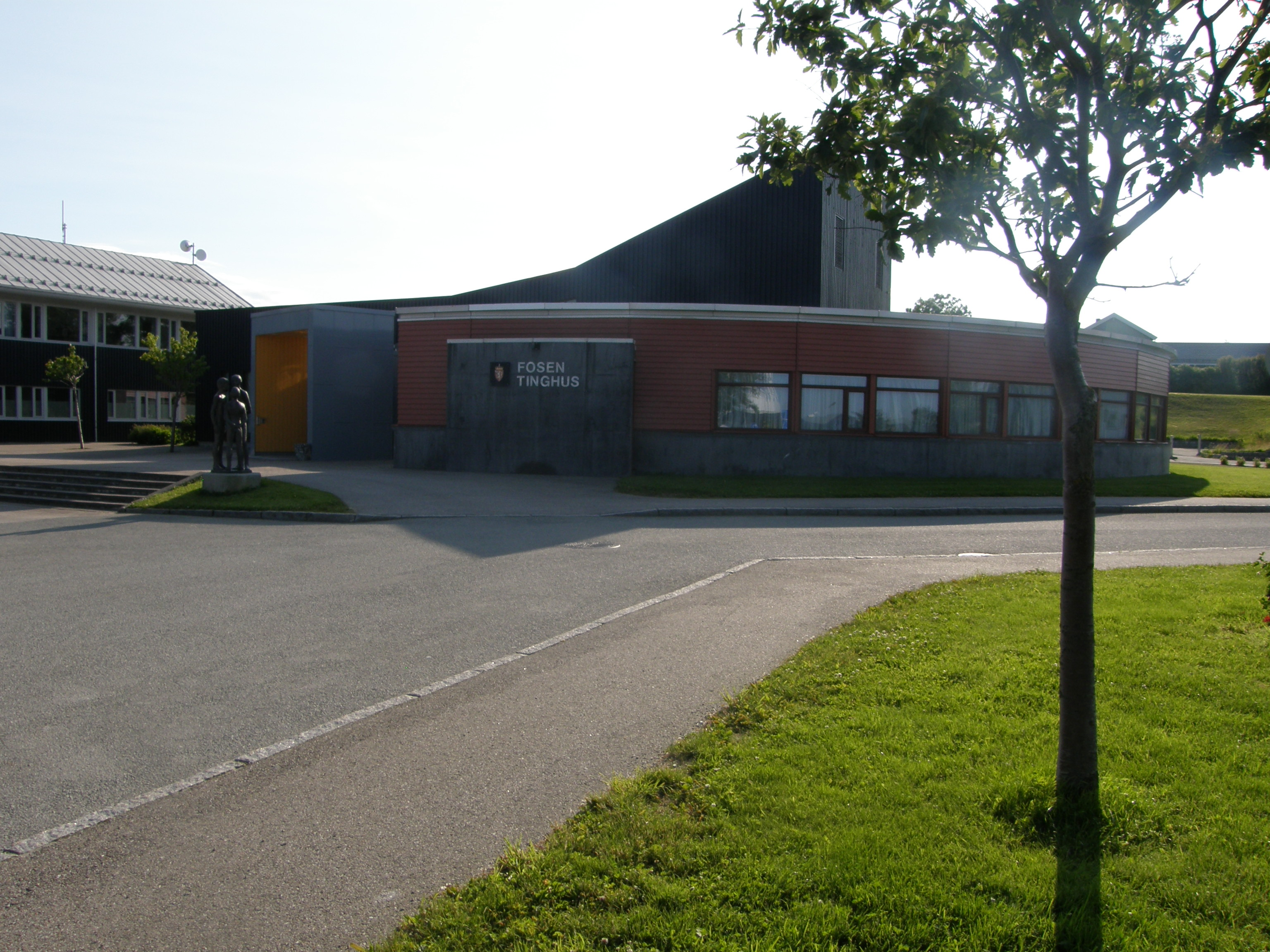
- Fosen Courthouse in Brekstad is the seat of Fosen District Court
- 63.68615°N 9.66587°E
- Established: 1591
- Dissolved: 12 April 2021
- Jurisdiction: Fosen
- Location: Brekstad, Norway
- Coordinates: 63.68615°N 9.66587°E
- Appeals to: Frostating Court of Appeal

Fosen District Court (Norwegian: Fosen tingrett) was a district court in Trøndelag county, Norway. The court was based at the Fosen Tinghus in the town of Brekstad in Ørland Municipality. The court existed from 1591 until 2021. It had jurisdiction over the municipalities of Ørland, Bjugn, Frøya, Hitra, Indre Fosen, Osen, Roan, and Åfjord. Cases from this court could be appealed to Frostating Court of Appeal. The court was last led by the acting chief judge (Sorenskriver) Leif Otto Østerbø. This court employed a chief judge, two other judges, and several prosecutors and administrators.

The court was a court of first instance. Its judicial duties were mainly to settle criminal cases and to resolve civil litigation as well as bankruptcy. The administration and registration tasks of the court included death registration, issuing certain certificates, performing duties of a notary public, and officiating civil wedding ceremonies. Cases from this court were heard by a combination of professional judges and lay judges.

== History ==
This court was established in 1591 when district courts were originally established in Norway. On 26 April 2021, the court was merged with the Namdal District Court, Inntrøndelag District Court, and Sør-Trøndelag District Court to create the new Trøndelag District Court.
