= Ørland Church =

Church in Trøndelag, Norway

- Ørland kirke
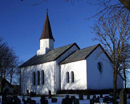
- View of the church
- Ørland Church
- 63.6915869°N 09.65113118°E
- Location: Ørland Municipality, Trøndelag
- Country: Norway
- Denomination: Church of Norway
- Previous denomination: Catholic Church
- Churchmanship: Evangelical Lutheran

History
- Former name: Viklem kirke
- Status: Parish church
- Founded: 12th century
- Consecrated: 12th century

Architecture
- Functional status: Active
- Architectural type: Long church
- Style: Romanesque
- Completed: 12th century

Specifications
- Capacity: 330
- Materials: Stone

Administration
- Diocese: Nidaros bispedømme
- Deanery: Fosen prosti
- Parish: Ørland
- Norwegian Cultural Heritage Site
- Type: Church
- Status: Automatically protected
- ID: 85908

Ørland Church (Norwegian: Ørland kirke) is a parish church of the Church of Norway in Ørland Municipality in Trøndelag county, Norway. It is located in the town of Brekstad, along the Trondheimsfjorden. It is one of the churches for the Ørland parish which is part of the Fosen prosti (deanery) in the Diocese of Nidaros. The white, stone church was built in a long church style during the 12th century. The church seats about 330 people.

== History ==
The earliest existing historical records of the church date back to the year 1342, the white, Romanesque, stone building was likely built during the 1100s. Originally, it had a rectangular nave and a smaller, narrower, rectangular chancel. The 1.3-metre (4 ft 3 in) thick walls are whitewashed stone. The church was built on the Viklem farm, so historically, the church was known as Viklem Church. Around the year 1500, the church was renovated and received it current shape and structural configuration.

In 1659, the small tower atop the church roof blew down in a storm and had to be repaired and rebuilt. The church was struck by lightning and burned down during a severe storm on 15 October 1766. It was repaired and rebuilt by Marcus Bauch from Trondheim from 1767 to 1768. Written historical records from afterwards state that "The church has now, after the fire, been restored, but it has been given a far too small and disproportionate spire. It has windows only on the south side, and these have formerly been very narrow and small; but now a couple of them have been made bigger." None of the medieval interior furnishings survived the fire, but the original walls remained intact. During this repair, a sacristy and entry porch were added as a wooden extension on the north side of the building. High mansard roofs were erected over the nave and chancel, and a bell tower with a spire was built over the left part of the roof. On 29 September 1767, the church was re-consecrated and put back into use. In 1792, the bell tower was being repaired when one of the workers fell from the roof in a terrible accident which caused his death.

In 1814, this church served as an election church (Norwegian: valgkirke). Together with more than 300 other parish churches across Norway, it was a polling station for elections to the 1814 Norwegian Constituent Assembly which wrote the Constitution of Norway. This was Norway's first national elections. Each church parish was a constituency that elected people called "electors" who later met together in each county to elect the representatives for the assembly that was to meet at Eidsvoll Manor later that year.

In 1816–1817, the roof structure over the nave and chancel and bell tower was demolished. The roof was rebuilt in the same mansard roof design as before. The bell tower was made larger at the same time. The tower now took on an octagonal shape, with a new spire and a tarred chipboard roof. On 14 February 1854, the church was struck by lightning and caught fire again needing to be rebuilt once again. The parish priest Rasmus Brochmann Parelius Gaarder wrote in the church records "Tuesday 14 February at 1:00 in the afternoon Ørland Church was set on fire by lightning and burned down within a few hours during a westerly and northwesterly storm. Only some walls are now left." The church was again rebuilt and put back into use in February 1856, although the work wasn't finished until the summer that year. The church was renovated in 1916 and again in 1960. The most recent design was by the architect Carl Riiber.

== Media gallery ==
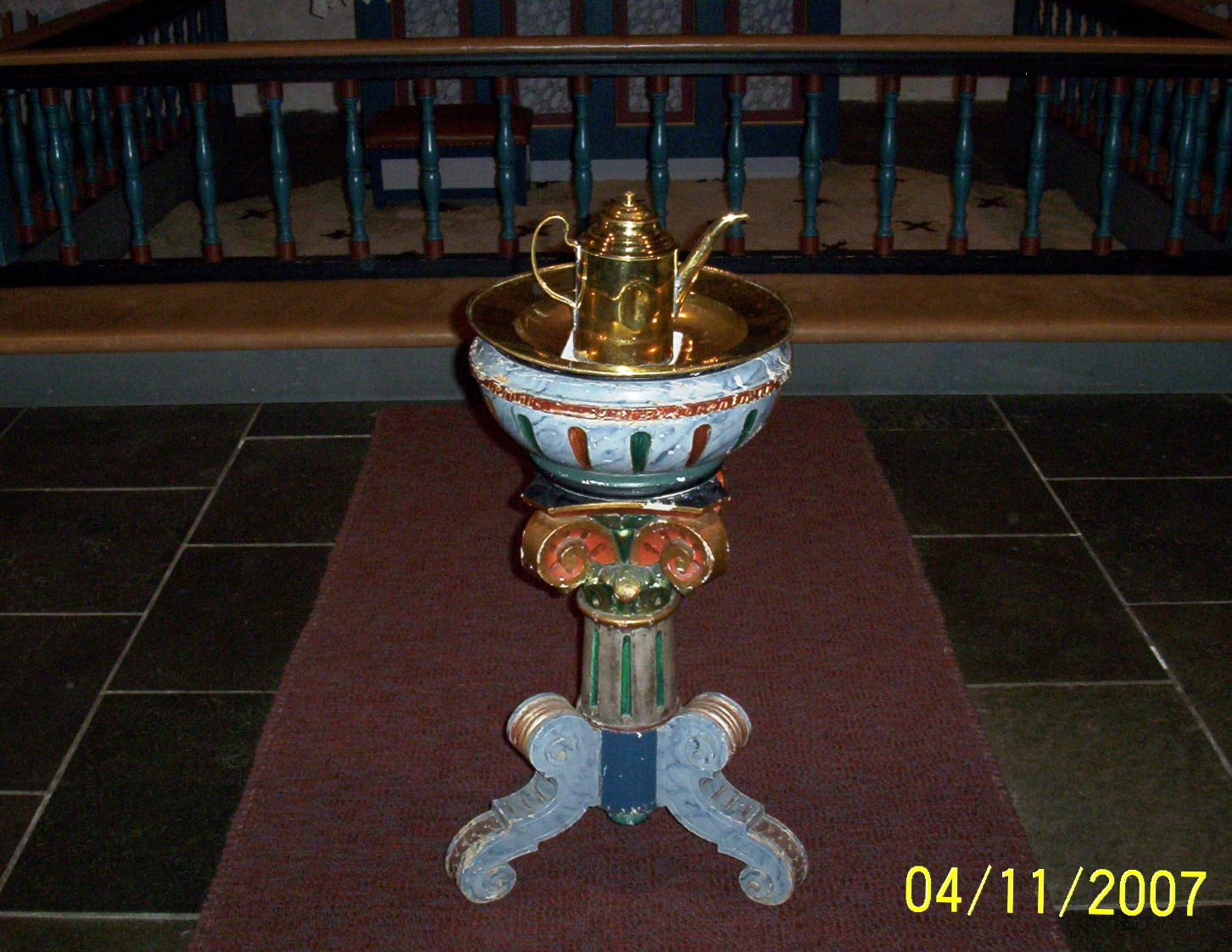
Baptismal font

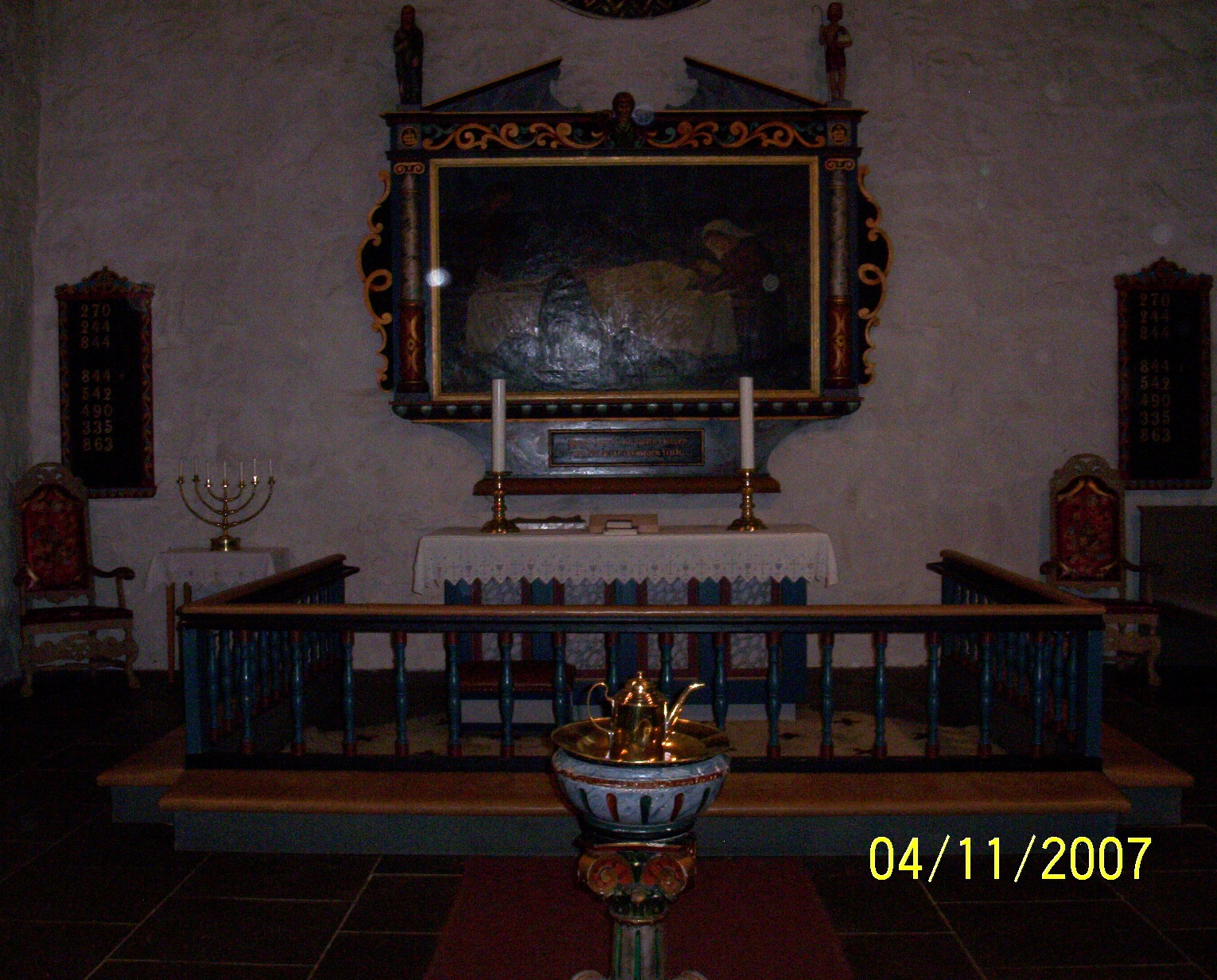
Altar

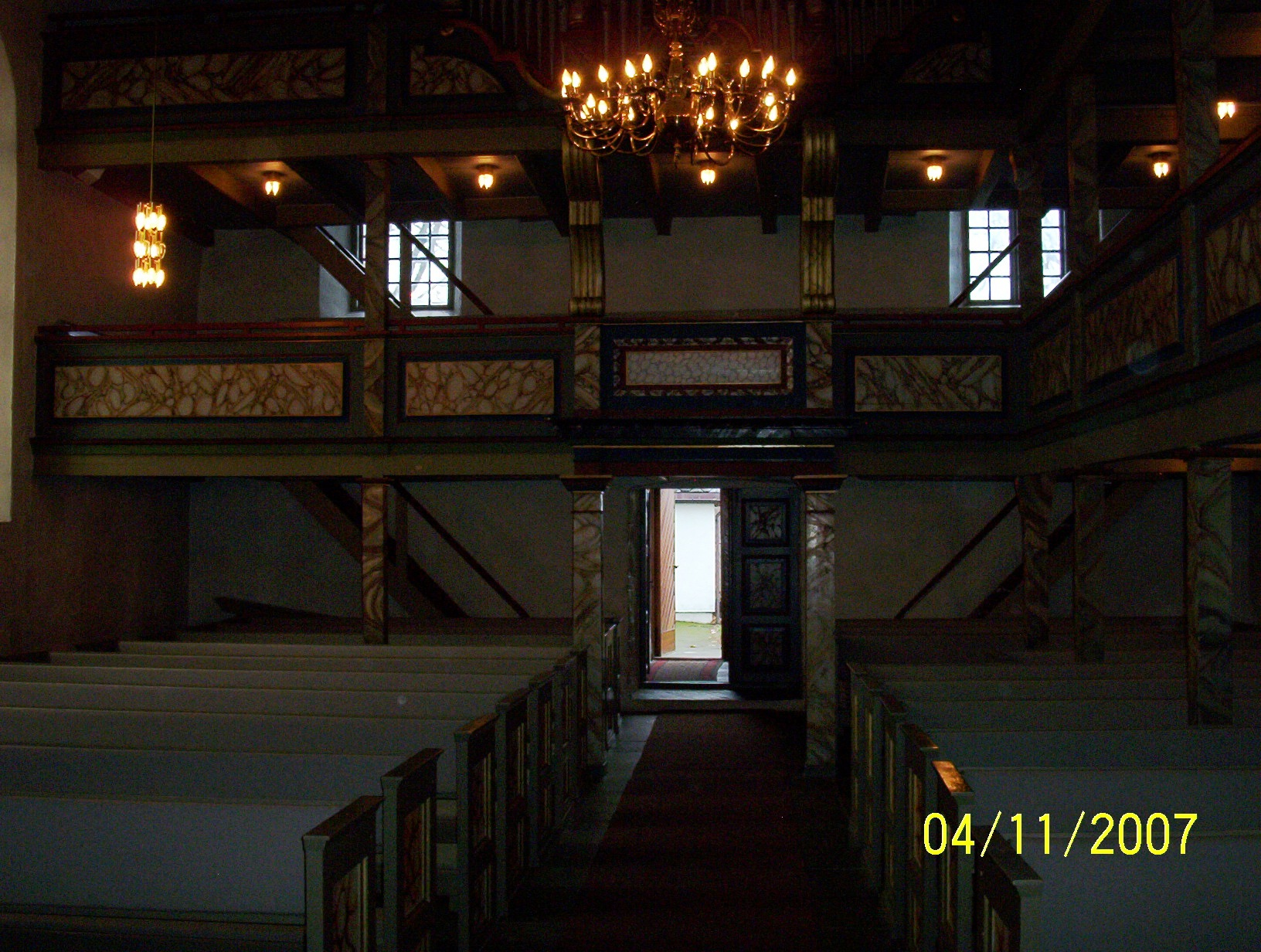
Gallery

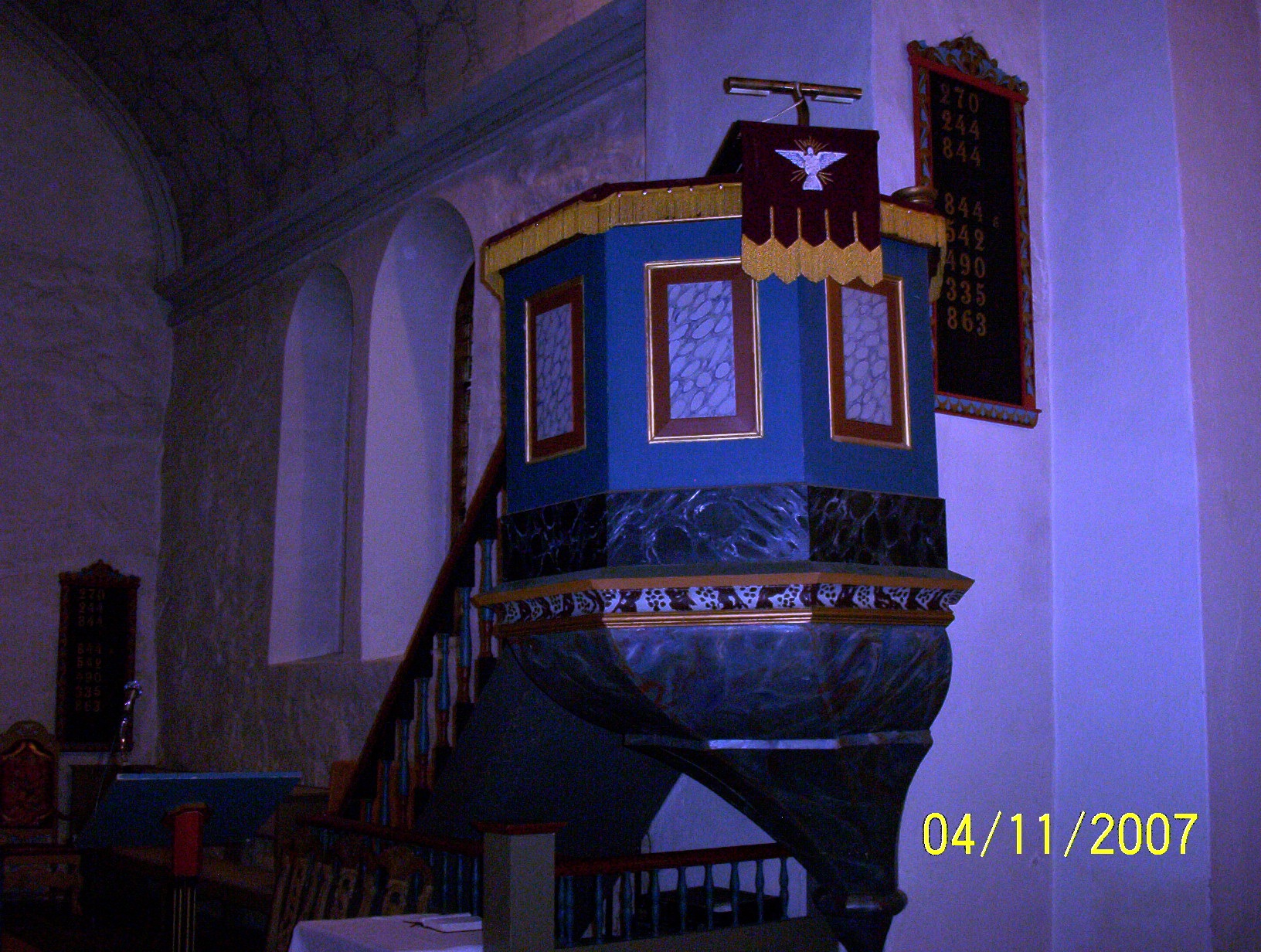
Pulpit

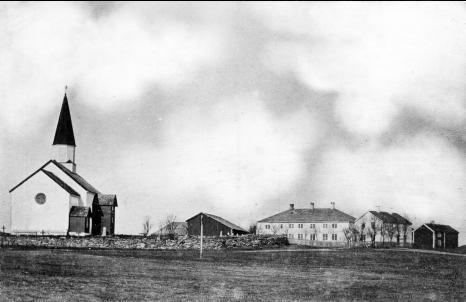
Church exterior in 1900

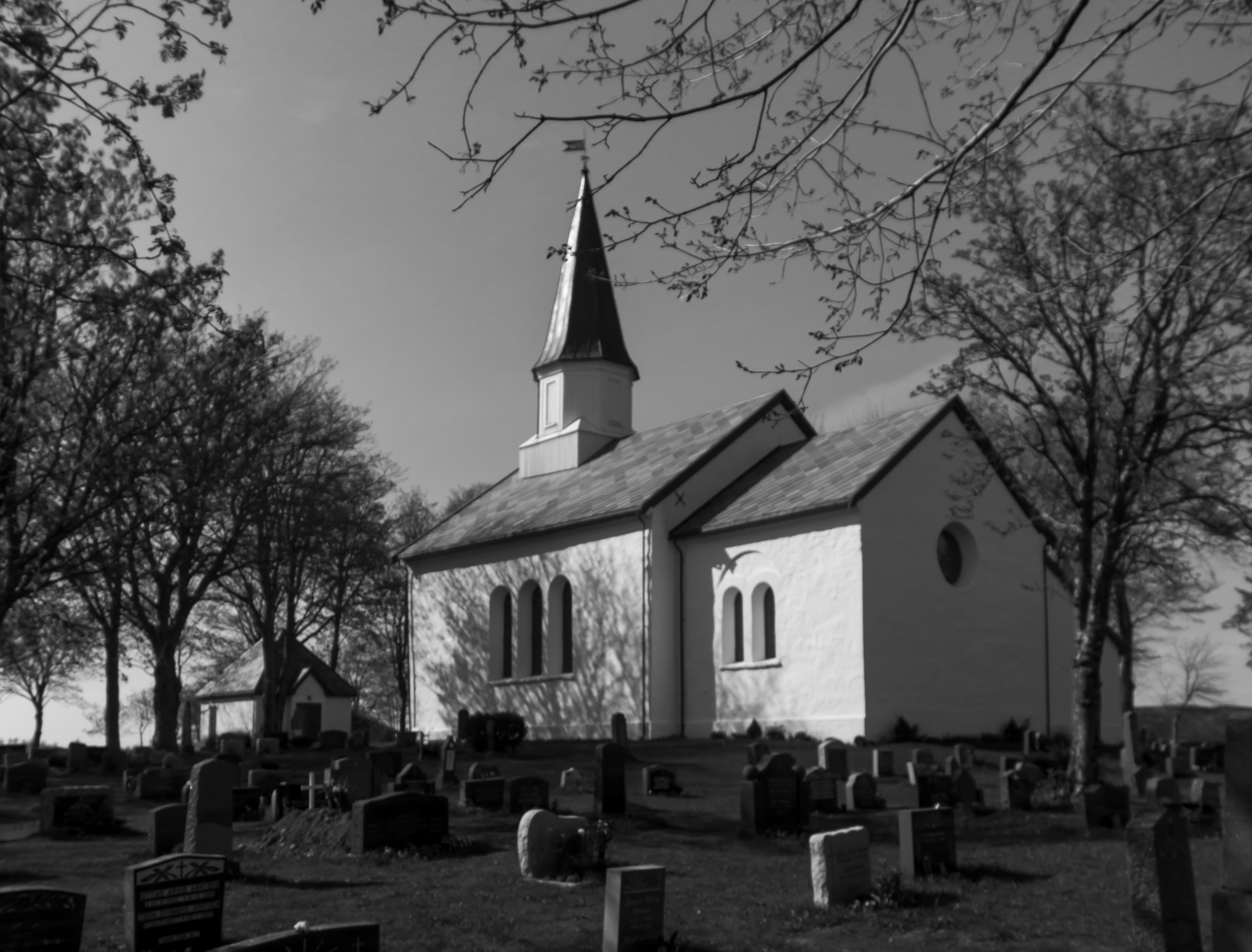
Exterior

== See also ==
- List of churches in Nidaros
