= Inntrøndelag District Court =

Former district court in Trøndelag, Norway

- Inntrøndelag tingrett
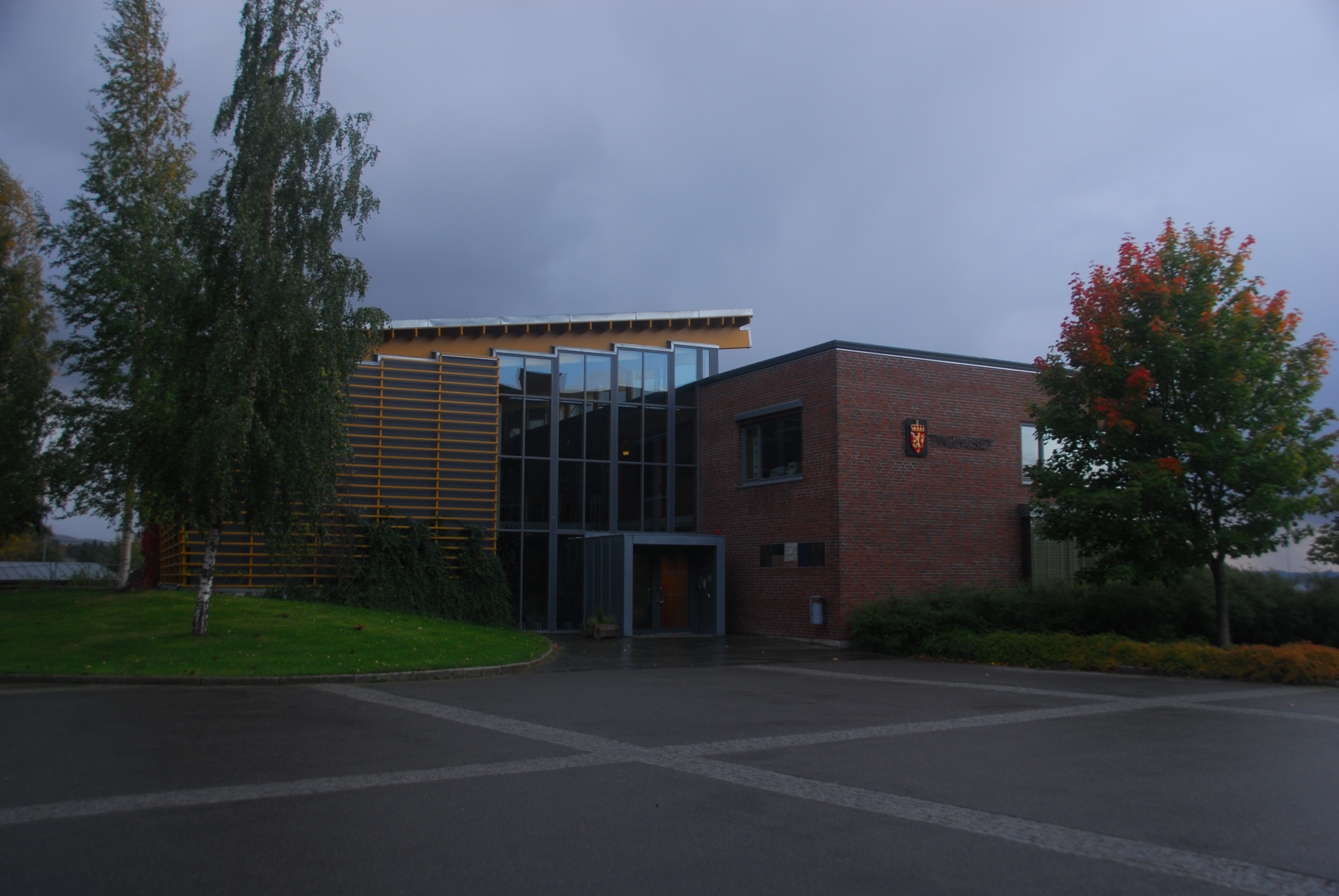
- View of the courthouse
- 64.0074°N 11.5011°E
- Established: 1 Jan 2011
- Dissolved: 12 April 2021
- Jurisdiction: Inntrøndelag
- Location: Steinkjer, Norway
- Coordinates: 64.0074°N 11.5011°E
- Appeals to: Frostating Court of Appeal

Inntrøndelag District Court (Norwegian: Inntrøndelag tingrett) was a district court in the Inntrøndelag region in Trøndelag county, Norway. The court was based in Steinkjer. The court existed until 2021. It had jurisdiction over the municipalities of Steinkjer, Inderøy, Snåsa, Verran, Verdal, Levanger, Frosta, Stjørdal, Meråker, and Namdalseid. Cases from this court could be appealed to Frostating Court of Appeal. The courthouse was built in 1997 for the old Inderøy District Court, and in 2010 there was a 25 million kr addition built to accommodate the new court. The court has seven judges and eleven clerks. The final presiding judge of the court was Odd Arve Bartnes.

The court was a court of first instance. Its judicial duties were mainly to settle criminal cases and to resolve civil litigation as well as bankruptcy. The administration and registration tasks of the court included death registration, issuing certain certificates, performing duties of a notary public, and officiating civil wedding ceremonies. Cases from this court were heard by a combination of professional judges and lay judges.

== History ==
This court was established on 1 January 2011 to replace the old Inderøy District Court (also located in Steinkjer) and the Stjør- and Verdal District Court (located in the town of Levanger). The court was formally opened on 14 June 2011. On 26 April 2021, the court was merged with the Namdal District Court, Fosen District Court, and Sør-Trøndelag District Court to create the new Trøndelag District Court.
