= Garten =

Island in Trøndelag, Norway

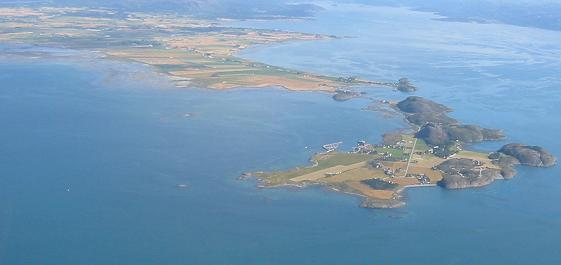
- Interactive map of Garten

Geography
- Location: Trøndelag, Norway
- Coordinates: 63.6423°N 09.5157°E
- Area: 1.5 km^{2} (0.58 sq mi)
- Length: 2.8 km (1.74 mi)
- Width: 900 m (3000 ft)
- Highest elevation: 74 m (243 ft)
- Highest point: Synnørsfjellet

Administration
- Norway
- County: Trøndelag
- Municipality: Ørland Municipality

Garten is a populated island in Ørland Municipality in Trøndelag county, Norway. The island is located on the north side of the mouth of the Trondheimsfjorden, just southwest of the mainland. The 1.5-square-kilometre (370-acre) island lies about 2 kilometres (1.2 mi) southeast of the island of Storfosna. The main population center on the island is also referred to as the village of Garten.

There is a bridge to the mainland as well as car ferry connections to the nearby island of Storfosna (also in Ørland Municipality) and also to the island of Leksa (in neighboring Orkland Municipality) and to the mainland of Orkland.

== See also ==
- List of islands of Norway
