= Ørland Municipality =

Municipality in Trøndelag, Norway

Ørland Municipality Ørland kommune
- Municipality
- Ørlandet herred (historic name)
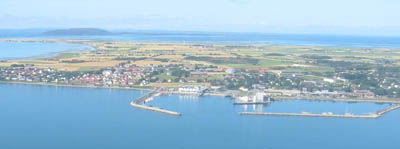
- View of the shoreline of Ørland

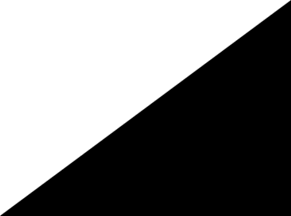
- Flag Coat of arms

- Trøndelag within Norway

- Ørland within Trøndelag
- Coordinates: 63°47′N 09°48′E
- Country: Norway
- County: Trøndelag
- District: Fosen
- Established: 1 Jan 1838
  - Created as: Formannskapsdistrikt
- Administrative centre: Bjugn

Government
  - Mayor (2023): Hallgeir Grøntvedt (Sp)

Area
  - Total: 457.15 km^{2} (176.51 sq mi)
  - Land: 429.10 km^{2} (165.68 sq mi)
  - Water: 28.05 km^{2} (10.83 sq mi) 6.1%
  - Rank: #218 in Norway
- Highest elevation: 492.57 m (1,616.0 ft)

Population (2024)
  - Total: 10,522
  - Rank: #110 in Norway
  - Density: 23/km^{2} (60/sq mi)
  - Change (10 years): ▲ +6.6%
- Demonym: Ørlending

Official language
  - Norwegian form: Bokmål
- Time zone: UTC+01:00 (CET)
  - Summer (DST): UTC+02:00 (CEST)
- ISO 3166 code: NO-5057
- Website: Official website

Ørland is a municipality in Trøndelag county, Norway. It is part of the Fosen region. Ørland Municipality is located at the southwestern tip of the Fosen peninsula at the northern shore of the mouth of Trondheimsfjord where the Stjørnfjorden arm begins. The administrative centre of the municipality is the village of Bjugn. Other larger settlements in Ørland include the town of Brekstad and the villages of Uthaug, Opphaug, Ottersbo, Høybakken, Jøssund, Lysøysundet, Nes, Oksvoll, and Vallersund.

The 457-square-kilometre (176 sq mi) municipality is the 218th largest by area out of the 357 municipalities in Norway. Ørland Municipality is the 110th most populous municipality in Norway with a population of 10,522. The municipality's population density is 23 inhabitants per square kilometre (60/sq mi) and its population has increased by 6.6% over the previous 10-year period.

== General information ==
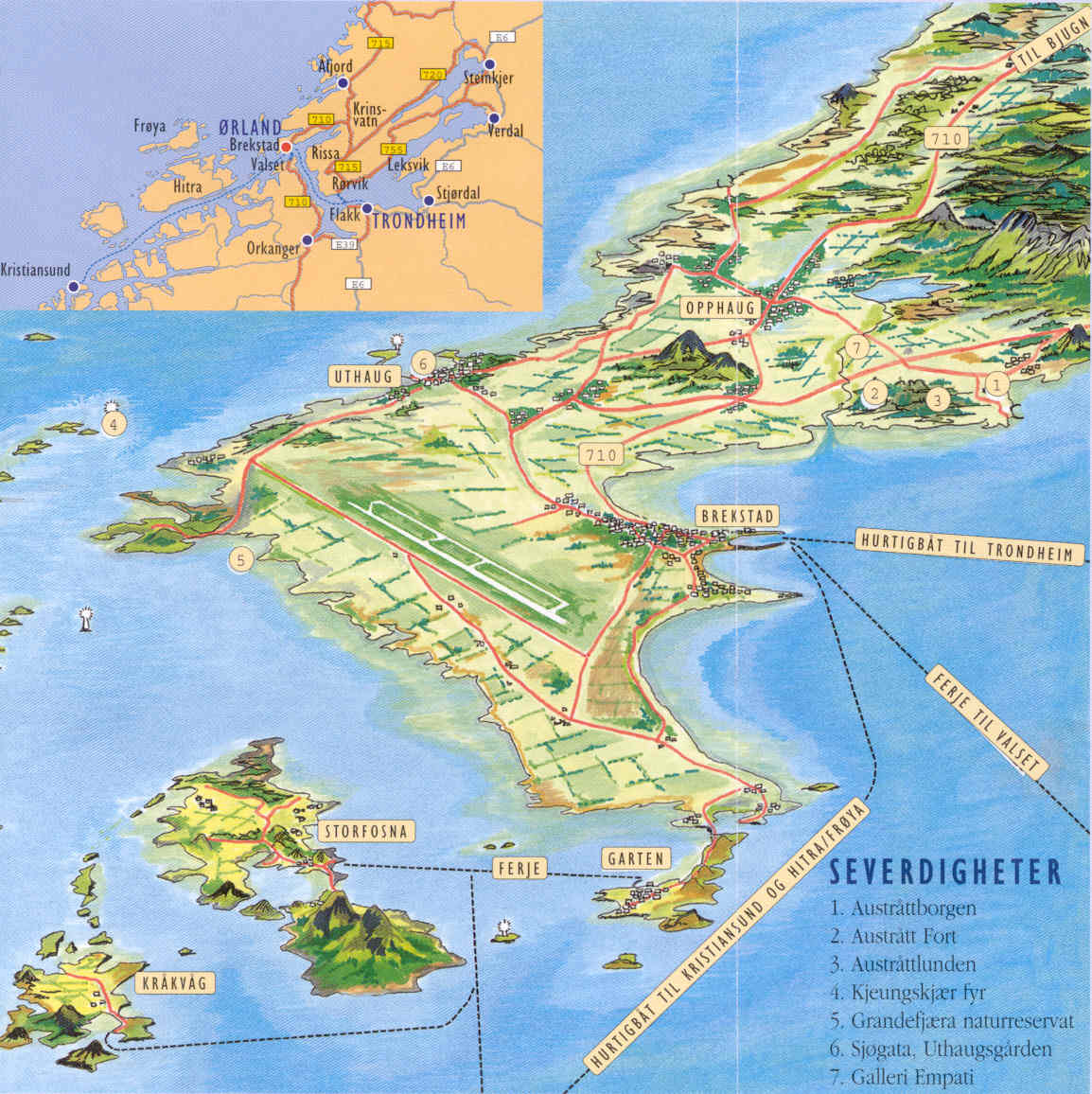
Map of Ørland

The municipality of Ørland was established on 1 January 1838 (see formannskapsdistrikt law). In 1853, the northern part of the municipality was separated to become the new Bjugn Municipality. This left Ørland with 3,361 residents. On 1 January 1896, the southern district of the municipality was separated from Ørland to become the new Værnes Municipality. After the division, Ørland had 3,649 residents and it was just a fraction of its original size.

On 1 January 2018, the municipality switched from the old Sør-Trøndelag county to the new Trøndelag county.

On 1 January 2020, Ørland Municipality and Bjugn Municipality merged to form a new, larger Ørland Municipality. At the same time, the administrative centre of the newly enlarged Ørland was moved from Brekstad to the village of Bjugn.

=== Name ===
The municipality (originally the parish) is named "Ørland" (Old Norse: Yrjar). The first element of the current name is Yrjar which is a plural form of aurr which means "gravel". During the 16th century, the suffix land (which means "land") was added. In 1590, the name was spelled Ørieland, and by the 1700s, the name was standardized to Ørlandet. On 3 November 1917, a royal resolution changed the spelling of the name of the municipality to Ørland, removing the definite form ending -et.

=== Coat of arms ===
The coat of arms was granted on 9 February 1979. The official blazon is "Party per bend sinister argent and sable" (Norwegian: Venstre skrådelt sølv og svart). This means the arms have a field (background) that is divided diagonally from the bottom left to the top right. The left side of the line has a tincture of argent which means it is commonly colored white, but if it is made out of metal, then silver is used. The right side of the line has a tincture of black. The design is derived from the historic coat of arms of Inger, Lady of Austraat, a noblewoman from the Rømer family who lived at the Austrått manor in Ørland from 1488 to 1555. She played a major role in the history of the area. She was later portrayed by Henrik Ibsen in his play Lady Inger of Ostrat. The arms were designed by Hallvard Trætteberg. The municipal flag has the same design as the coat of arms.

=== Churches ===
The Church of Norway has four parishes (sokn) within Ørland Municipality. It is part of the Fosen prosti (deanery) in the Diocese of Nidaros.

Churches in Ørland Municipality
Parish (sokn)	Church name	Location of the church	Year built
Bjugn	Bjugn Church	west of Bjugn	1956
Bjugn	Hegvik Church	Høybakken	1858
Jøssund	Jøssund Church	Jøssund	1875
Nes	Nes Church	Nes	1878
Nes	Tarva Chapel	Nordbuen, Tarva	1972
Ørland	Ørland Church	Brekstad	1342
Ørland	Storfosna Church	Storfosna	1915

== Geography ==
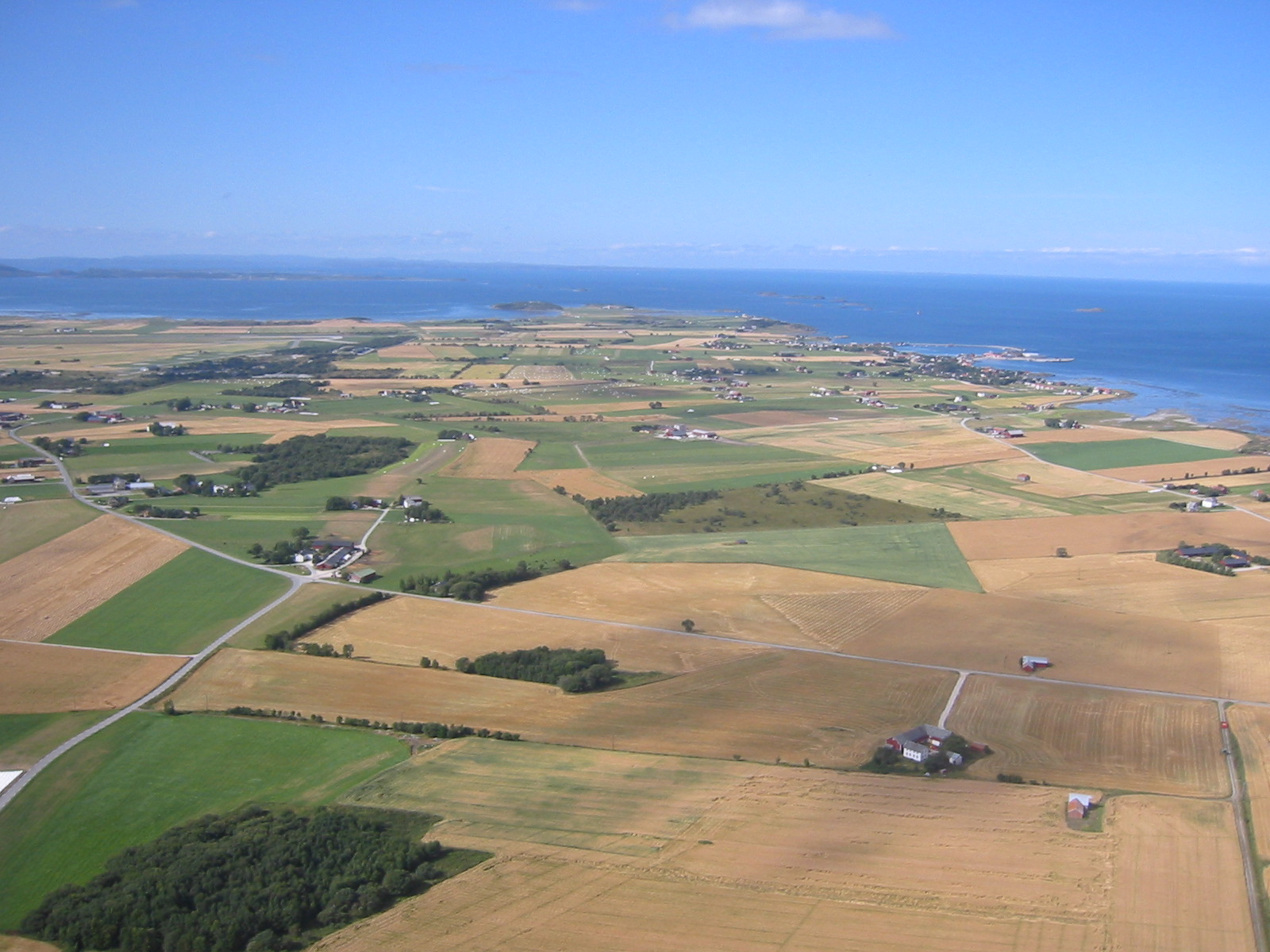
Ørland is coastal lowland

Ørland is on the Norwegian mainland, situated on the northern shore of the mouth of the Trondheimsfjord, and is largely flat lowland. Ørland faces the Norwegian Sea to the west with Trondheimsfjord and the mouth of the Stjørnfjord to the east. Ørland's topography differs markedly from most other areas in Norway. Only 2% of the municipality exceeds an altitude of 160 metres (520 ft) above sea level. Ørland consists of wide open spaces mainly used by Norway's Ørland Main Air Station, agriculture, nature conservation areas and residential neighborhoods. The municipality also includes three inhabited islands (Garten, Kråkvåg and Storfosna) as well as many islets. The Kjeungskjær lighthouse lies at the mouth of the Bjugnfjorden in the northeastern part of the municipality.

The highest point in the municipality is the 492.57-metre (1,616.0 ft) tall mountain Seksortklumpen. Fosenheia, a peak south of Storfosna, is also highly visible in the landscape. The Convention on Wetlands, called the Ramsar Convention, is an intergovernmental treaty that provides the framework for national action and international cooperation for the conservation and wise use of wetlands and their resources. Ørland has four Ramsar areas: Grandefjæra nature conservancy, and the wildlife protection areas of Hovsfjæra, Innstrandfjæra, and Kråkvågsvaet, all of which are significant for seabirds, wading birds and migratory birds. The area around Rusasetvatnet is important for bird life. Austråttlunden landscape conservancy also has protected status.

=== Climate ===
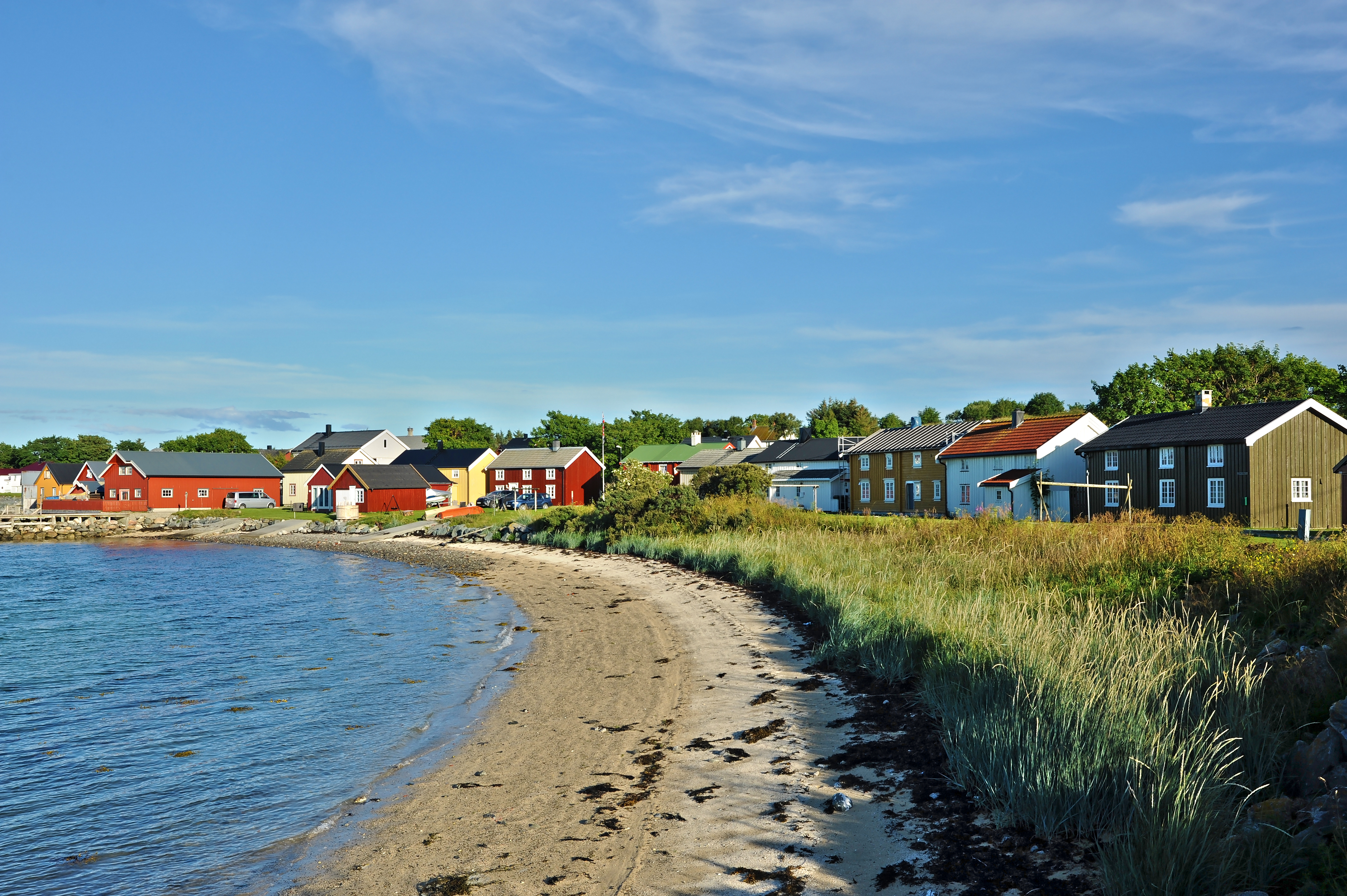
Sjøgata in Uthaug

Ørland has a very mild climate for the latitude, albeit at times windy. Ørland is one of the northernmost locations to have a mild enough winter and long enough summer to fulfill all criteria as a temperate oceanic climate (Cfb). The all-time high is 32.7 °C (90.9 °F) recorded 17 July 2025. The warmest month on record is July 2025 with mean 18.4 °C (65.1 °F) and average daily high 23.3 °C (73.9 °F). The all-time low is −20.5 °C (−4.9 °F) recorded February 1958, and the coldest low after 2000 is −18.6 °C (−1.5 °F) from February 2010. The coldest month on record is February 1966 with mean −6.1 °C (21.0 °F) and average daily low −9.3 °C (15.3 °F). The average date for the last overnight freeze (low below 0 °C (32.0 °F)) in spring is 27 April and average date for first freeze in autumn is 21 October (1981–2010 average) giving a frost-free season of 176 days. The prevailing wind direction is from the southwest, a wind sometimes accompanied by precipitation. Snow rarely remains after 3–4 days in the town Brekstad and other coastal areas of the municipality. However, in the eastern parts of the municipality the snow remains longer making possible skiing and other winter activities at the lighted track near the Yrjar ski cabin. The weather station is located at Ørland Main Air Station.

Climate data for Ørland Main Air Station 1991–2020 (10 m, precipitation days 1961–90, extremes 1955–present)
Month	Jan	Feb	Mar	Apr	May	Jun	Jul	Aug	Sep	Oct	Nov	Dec	Year
Record high °C (°F)	12.4 (54.3)	10.9 (51.6)	14.3 (57.7)	22.6 (72.7)	28.9 (84.0)	30.7 (87.3)	32.7 (90.9)	31.8 (89.2)	25.9 (78.6)	19.6 (67.3)	14.2 (57.6)	12.2 (54.0)	32.7 (90.9)
Mean daily maximum °C (°F)	3.1 (37.6)	2.8 (37.0)	4.7 (40.5)	8.8 (47.8)	12.6 (54.7)	15.3 (59.5)	17.9 (64.2)	18 (64)	14.5 (58.1)	9.4 (48.9)	5.6 (42.1)	3.8 (38.8)	9.7 (49.4)
Daily mean °C (°F)	1.1 (34.0)	0.7 (33.3)	2.1 (35.8)	5.4 (41.7)	8.8 (47.8)	11.7 (53.1)	14 (57)	14.1 (57.4)	11.3 (52.3)	7 (45)	3.7 (38.7)	1.7 (35.1)	6.8 (44.3)
Mean daily minimum °C (°F)	−1.3 (29.7)	−1.7 (28.9)	−0.7 (30.7)	2.1 (35.8)	5.3 (41.5)	8.4 (47.1)	10.6 (51.1)	10.7 (51.3)	8.4 (47.1)	4.5 (40.1)	1.4 (34.5)	−0.7 (30.7)	3.9 (39.0)
Record low °C (°F)	−19.8 (−3.6)	−20.5 (−4.9)	−16.5 (2.3)	−8.6 (16.5)	−3.1 (26.4)	0.1 (32.2)	3.6 (38.5)	1 (34)	−3.3 (26.1)	−8 (18)	−15.4 (4.3)	−18 (0)	−20.5 (−4.9)
Average precipitation mm (inches)	88 (3.5)	82 (3.2)	76 (3.0)	55 (2.2)	52 (2.0)	69 (2.7)	63 (2.5)	91 (3.6)	110 (4.3)	104 (4.1)	92 (3.6)	111 (4.4)	993 (39.1)
Average precipitation days (≥ 1.0 mm)	16	15	15	11	10	12	11	13	14	15	14	16	162
Source 1:
Source 2:

== Government ==
Ørland Municipality is responsible for primary education (through 10th grade), outpatient health services, senior citizen services, welfare and other social services, zoning, economic development, and municipal roads and utilities. The municipality is governed by a municipal council of directly elected representatives. The mayor is indirectly elected by a vote of the municipal council. The municipality is under the jurisdiction of the Trøndelag District Court and the Frostating Court of Appeal.

Both Ørland and Bjugn joined the inter-municipal waste management agency Fosen Renovasjon when it was founded in 1997, and it carried over operations with the municipal merger.

=== Municipal council ===
The municipal council (Kommunestyre) of Ørland Municipality is made up of 31 representatives that are elected to four year terms. The tables below show the current and historical composition of the council by political party.

Ørland kommunestyre 2023–2027
Party name (in Norwegian)	Number of representatives
Labour Party (Arbeiderpartiet)	8
Progress Party (Fremskrittspartiet)	2
Green Party (Miljøpartiet De Grønne)	1
Conservative Party (Høyre)	6
Industry and Business Party (Industri‑ og Næringspartiet)	4
Red Party (Rødt)	1
Centre Party (Senterpartiet)	7
Socialist Left Party (Sosialistisk Venstreparti)	1
Liberal Party (Venstre)	1
Total number of members:	31

Ørland kommunestyre 2019–2023
Party name (in Norwegian)	Number of representatives
Labour Party (Arbeiderpartiet)	12
Progress Party (Fremskrittspartiet)	2
Green Party (Miljøpartiet De Grønne)	1
Conservative Party (Høyre)	6
Centre Party (Senterpartiet)	12
Socialist Left Party (Sosialistisk Venstreparti)	2
Total number of members:	35
Note: On 1 January 2020, Bjugn Municipality became part of Ørland Municipality.

Ørland kommunestyre 2015–2019
Party name (in Norwegian)	Number of representatives
Labour Party (Arbeiderpartiet)	5
Progress Party (Fremskrittspartiet)	1
Conservative Party (Høyre)	10
Centre Party (Senterpartiet)	7
Socialist Left Party (Sosialistisk Venstreparti)	1
Liberal Party (Venstre)	1
Total number of members:	25

Ørland kommunestyre 2011–2015
Party name (in Norwegian)	Number of representatives
Labour Party (Arbeiderpartiet)	4
Progress Party (Fremskrittspartiet)	2
Conservative Party (Høyre)	8
Centre Party (Senterpartiet)	8
Socialist Left Party (Sosialistisk Venstreparti)	1
Liberal Party (Venstre)	2
Total number of members:	25

Ørland kommunestyre 2007–2011
Party name (in Norwegian)	Number of representatives
Labour Party (Arbeiderpartiet)	4
Progress Party (Fremskrittspartiet)	3
Conservative Party (Høyre)	6
Christian Democratic Party (Kristelig Folkeparti)	1
Pensioners' Party (Pensjonistpartiet)	1
Centre Party (Senterpartiet)	8
Socialist Left Party (Sosialistisk Venstreparti)	1
Liberal Party (Venstre)	1
Total number of members:	25

Ørland kommunestyre 2003–2007
Party name (in Norwegian)	Number of representatives
Labour Party (Arbeiderpartiet)	3
Progress Party (Fremskrittspartiet)	2
Conservative Party (Høyre)	6
Pensioners' Party (Pensjonistpartiet)	2
Centre Party (Senterpartiet)	9
Socialist Left Party (Sosialistisk Venstreparti)	2
Liberal Party (Venstre)	1
Total number of members:	25

Ørland kommunestyre 1999–2003
Party name (in Norwegian)	Number of representatives
Labour Party (Arbeiderpartiet)	4
Progress Party (Fremskrittspartiet)	1
Conservative Party (Høyre)	6
Christian Democratic Party (Kristelig Folkeparti)	1
Pensioners' Party (Pensjonistpartiet)	2
Centre Party (Senterpartiet)	9
Socialist Left Party (Sosialistisk Venstreparti)	1
Liberal Party (Venstre)	1
Total number of members:	25

Ørland kommunestyre 1995–1999
Party name (in Norwegian)	Number of representatives
Labour Party (Arbeiderpartiet)	4
Conservative Party (Høyre)	5
Christian Democratic Party (Kristelig Folkeparti)	1
Pensioners' Party (Pensjonistpartiet)	1
Centre Party (Senterpartiet)	11
Socialist Left Party (Sosialistisk Venstreparti)	1
Liberal Party (Venstre)	1
Non-party list (Upolitisk liste)	1
Total number of members:	25

Ørland kommunestyre 1991–1995
Party name (in Norwegian)	Number of representatives
Labour Party (Arbeiderpartiet)	4
Conservative Party (Høyre)	5
Christian Democratic Party (Kristelig Folkeparti)	1
Centre Party (Senterpartiet)	10
Socialist Left Party (Sosialistisk Venstreparti)	2
Pensioner and insured list (Pensjonister og trygdedes liste)	2
Non-party list (Upolitisk liste)	1
Total number of members:	25

Ørland kommunestyre 1987–1991
Party name (in Norwegian)	Number of representatives
Labour Party (Arbeiderpartiet)	7
Progress Party (Fremskrittspartiet)	1
Conservative Party (Høyre)	8
Christian Democratic Party (Kristelig Folkeparti)	1
Centre Party (Senterpartiet)	6
Socialist Left Party (Sosialistisk Venstreparti)	1
Liberal Party (Venstre)	1
Total number of members:	25

Ørland kommunestyre 1983–1987
Party name (in Norwegian)	Number of representatives
Labour Party (Arbeiderpartiet)	7
Progress Party (Fremskrittspartiet)	1
Conservative Party (Høyre)	7
Christian Democratic Party (Kristelig Folkeparti)	2
Centre Party (Senterpartiet)	6
Socialist Left Party (Sosialistisk Venstreparti)	1
Liberal Party (Venstre)	1
Total number of members:	25

Ørland kommunestyre 1979–1983
Party name (in Norwegian)	Number of representatives
Labour Party (Arbeiderpartiet)	6
Conservative Party (Høyre)	6
Christian Democratic Party (Kristelig Folkeparti)	3
Centre Party (Senterpartiet)	7
Socialist Left Party (Sosialistisk Venstreparti)	1
Joint list of the Liberal Party (Venstre) and New People's Party (Nye Folkepartiet)	2
Total number of members:	25

Ørland kommunestyre 1975–1979
Party name (in Norwegian)	Number of representatives
Labour Party (Arbeiderpartiet)	7
Conservative Party (Høyre)	5
Christian Democratic Party (Kristelig Folkeparti)	3
New People's Party (Nye Folkepartiet)	1
Centre Party (Senterpartiet)	7
Socialist Left Party (Sosialistisk Venstreparti)	1
Non-party list (Upolitisk Liste)	1
Total number of members:	25

Ørland kommunestyre 1971–1975
Party name (in Norwegian)	Number of representatives
Labour Party (Arbeiderpartiet)	7
Conservative Party (Høyre)	4
Christian Democratic Party (Kristelig Folkeparti)	2
Centre Party (Senterpartiet)	7
Liberal Party (Venstre)	3
Total number of members:	25

Ørland kommunestyre 1967–1971
Party name (in Norwegian)	Number of representatives
Labour Party (Arbeiderpartiet)	8
Conservative Party (Høyre)	4
Christian Democratic Party (Kristelig Folkeparti)	2
Centre Party (Senterpartiet)	8
Liberal Party (Venstre)	3
Total number of members:	25

Ørland kommunestyre 1963–1967
Party name (in Norwegian)	Number of representatives
Labour Party (Arbeiderpartiet)	8
Conservative Party (Høyre)	4
Christian Democratic Party (Kristelig Folkeparti)	3
Centre Party (Senterpartiet)	7
Liberal Party (Venstre)	2
Local List(s) (Lokale lister)	1
Total number of members:	25

Ørland herredsstyre 1959–1963
Party name (in Norwegian)	Number of representatives
Labour Party (Arbeiderpartiet)	4
Conservative Party (Høyre)	1
Christian Democratic Party (Kristelig Folkeparti)	3
Centre Party (Senterpartiet)	5
Liberal Party (Venstre)	1
Local List(s) (Lokale lister)	3
Total number of members:	17

Ørland herredsstyre 1955–1959
Party name (in Norwegian)	Number of representatives
Labour Party (Arbeiderpartiet)	4
Conservative Party (Høyre)	1
Christian Democratic Party (Kristelig Folkeparti)	2
Farmers' Party (Bondepartiet)	6
Liberal Party (Venstre)	2
Local List(s) (Lokale lister)	2
Total number of members:	17

Ørland herredsstyre 1951–1955
Party name (in Norwegian)	Number of representatives
Labour Party (Arbeiderpartiet)	4
Conservative Party (Høyre)	1
Christian Democratic Party (Kristelig Folkeparti)	5
Farmers' Party (Bondepartiet)	5
Liberal Party (Venstre)	2
Total number of members:	16

Ørland herredsstyre 1947–1951
Party name (in Norwegian)	Number of representatives
Labour Party (Arbeiderpartiet)	2
Christian Democratic Party (Kristelig Folkeparti)	3
Farmers' Party (Bondepartiet)	6
Liberal Party (Venstre)	3
List of workers, fishermen, and small farmholders (Arbeidere, fiskere, småbrukere liste)	1
Local List(s) (Lokale lister)	1
Total number of members:	16

Ørland herredsstyre 1945–1947
Party name (in Norwegian)	Number of representatives
Labour Party (Arbeiderpartiet)	2
Farmers' Party (Bondepartiet)	7
Liberal Party (Venstre)	3
List of workers, fishermen, and small farmholders (Arbeidere, fiskere, småbrukere liste)	3
Local List(s) (Lokale lister)	1
Total number of members:	16

Ørland herredsstyre 1937–1941*
Party name (in Norwegian)	Number of representatives
Labour Party (Arbeiderpartiet)	2
Farmers' Party (Bondepartiet)	6
Liberal Party (Venstre)	4
List of workers, fishermen, and small farmholders (Arbeidere, fiskere, småbrukere liste)	3
Local List(s) (Lokale lister)	1
Total number of members:	16
Note: Due to the German occupation of Norway during World War II, no elections were held for new municipal councils until after the war ended in 1945.

=== Mayors ===
The mayor (Norwegian: ordfører) of Ørland Municipality is the political leader of the municipality and the chairperson of the municipal council. Here is a list of people who have held this position:

- 1838–1841: Augustinius Gaarder
- 1842–1845: Rasmus Gaarder
- 1846–1849: Eiler Hagerup Nannestad
- 1850–1853: Rasmus Gaarder
- 1854–1857: Eiler Hagerup Nannestad
- 1857–1859: Jacob C. Uthaug
- 1860–1864: Johan Nicolai Franzen
- 1865–1865: Johan Arnt Vik
- 1866–1869: Jonas Angell
- 1870–1877: Ole Wiggen
- 1878–1879: Carl Grann
- 1880–1881: Hans Aage Uthaug
- 1882–1916: Jakob T. Hoff (V)
- 1917–1928: Peder Næsset (Bp)
- 1929–1934: Per J. Gjelvold (Bp)
- 1935–1940: Leiv Aas (V)
- 1941–1945: Harald A. Dahl (Bp/NS)
- 1945–1951: Leiv Aas (V)
- 1952–1963: Akim Murvold (Sp)
- 1964–1969: Johan Bakken (Sp)
- 1970–1973: Alf Bjørkum (V)
- 1974–1975: Leif Johan Lyngstad (H)
- 1976–1983: Oddbjørn Hågård (Sp)
- 1984–1987: Einar Løkra (Sp)
- 1988–1989: Turid Skogstad (Ap)
- 1990–1997: Oddvar Hoøen (Sp)
- 1997–1999: Hallgeir Grøntvedt (Sp)
- 1999–2003: Knut Ring (Ap)
- 2003–2015: Hallgeir Grøntvedt (Sp)
- 2015–2022: Tom Myrvold (H)
- 2022–2023: Ogne Undertun (Ap)
- 2023–present: Hallgeir Grøntvedt (Sp)

== Economy ==
Major occupations are the Ørland Air Base, part of the Royal Norwegian Air Force; agriculture; industry, public services; and commerce.

The largest employer of the Fosen peninsula is the military air force base located in Ørland municipality. In 2013 about 650 employees and 254 drafted soldiers worked at the base. With the upgrade of the base it is estimated that the base will have 1070 employees and 565 drafted soldiers in 2020. Ørland Air Base is currently one of two main air force bases in Norway. The Norwegian parliament decided in 2012 to concentrate most of fighter planes at one base: Ørland. The base is currently in the process of upgrading to be able to operate Norway's new fighter jet, the F-35 Joint Strike Fighter. Fifty-two planes are to be acquired from Lockheed Martin, most of which will be stationed in Ørland. Ørland is also operating Westland Sea King search and rescue helicopters as well as being a forward operations location of NATO's surveillance plane the E-3/AWACS. The Norwegian F-16 Immediate Reaction Force is stationed at Ørland along with support and administration.

Mascot Høie, established in 1986, is the largest industrial employer in the municipality. The company produces duvets, pillows, blankets duvet covers and bed linens. Headquarters are located in Brekstad, Ørland and employs about 100.

Grøntvedt Pelagic, established in 1988, employs around 100 and processes herring, mackerel and other pelagic species in their factories in Uthaug and Kråkvåg. The company is the world's largest producer of barrel-marinated herring.

In 2010, agriculture employed about 8% of the population of Ørland and the sector is dominating the landscape of Ørland. The most important products were milk, grain and meat. Ørland Cheese and Milk Factory closed its doors in 2011. Ørland Savings Bank was established in 1849, only 26 years after the first of its kind in Norway (in Christiania). The bank is an independent bank, but is part of Eika-Gruppen.

Ørland is a regional center for both shopping and business services. In the city of Brekstad shoppers can visit and enjoy several clothing stores, grocery stores, cafes, lumber, and hardware stores, goldsmiths, flower shop, convenience stores, sports stores, gift stores, restaurants, optometry store, health food store, drug store, Asian grocery store, bookshop, banks, office supply, pet supplies, paint store, art galleries, furniture store, bakeries, car dealers and liquor store. Business services like accountants, attorneys, banks, consultants, advertising agencies, office supplies, auditing, print shops, collection agency and office services are readily available.

== Transportation and communication ==
Passenger ferries run between Brekstad and Trondheim eight times each direction on weekdays (reduced service on weekends). This makes commuting convenient and many commute to and from Trondheim for work or studies on a daily basis. Several employees of the air force live outside of Ørland. There is a daily weekday average of about 900 passengers – 400 of which travels to or from Hitra/Frøya or Kristiansund.

Automobile ferry service connects Brekstad to Valset in Agdenes municipality. This connection is a part of Norwegian County Road 710 (Fv 710) from Orkanger to Krinsvatn. On weekdays the ferry departs every 30 minutes during rush hour; hourly the rest of the day.

Air Norway is an airline owned by Ørland municipality, Nordic Air AS and North Flying AS. The company operates direct flights between Ørland and Oslo Airport, Gardermoen as well continuation of flight to Aalborg, Denmark.

In 1923, the island of Garten was connected to the mainland by bridge. The bridge between the two islands of Storfosna and Kråkvåg opened in 2003. A ferry connects Garten to Storfosna. The ferry also connects Garten and Storfosna with Leksa and Værnes in Agdenes municipality across the Trondheim Fjord.

Good electronic communications is available via fiber network to most residents in Brekstad and the towns of Uthaug and Opphaug while ADSL/VDSL is available everywhere else. Mobile G4 service is available in most of Ørland.

== Education and health services ==
The municipality has two recently renovated public primary schools: Opphaug skole (which serves the villages of Opphaug, Ottersbo and Uthaug) and Hårberg skole (which serves the city of Brekstad as well as the villages of Beian, Garten, Grande, Kråkvåg, Rønne, and Storfosna). A new primary school in Brekstad is planned completed by the school year starting in 2017. Middle school kids attend a school renovated in 2009: Ørland ungdomsskole in Brekstad. Most high school students attend Fosen videregående skole in the village of Bjugn.

For preschool children, the municipality offers services at Futura and Borgen childcare centers. The private childcare centers Marihøna Music and Outdoors childcare center, Teletun Nature- and Farm childcare center and Solblomsten Steiner childcare center.

The municipal health services are located in Ørland Medical Center (Ørland Medisinske Senter)/ Fosen Helse IKS/Fosen DMS. The center has developed from being a health clinic and birthing center founded and run by the Norwegian Women's Public Health Association (N.K.S) to a health care center that offers a wide range of services. The municipality has one of the largest offering within decentralized health services in Norway: emergency room, health promotion and disease prevention center, cancer coordinators, mental health services, psychologist, X-ray services, dermatologist, phototherapy, endocrinology (stomach and intestinal diseases), otorhinolaryngology (ear, nose and throat), gynecology, surgery, orthopedics. In addition, the center offers services such as specialized rehabilitation, ambulance, midwife and ophthalmologist.

== Attractions ==
Major attractions are the Ramsar Convention Bird Protection areas, the coastal areas themselves, and the Manor of Austrått, dated 1656 and with a known history from around 1000 AD. Other attractions are the single, large Sessile oak (the northernmost in the world, known as Austråtteika) in the nearby forest; and the fortifications of the triple 28-centimetre (11 in) gun turret from World War II, which is now open to public viewing.

== History ==
Archaeological digs have shown that Ørland has been a regional center at least starting at the Iron Age. One of the longhouses found has a unique structure, believed to have served a special purpose, for example a court, customs house or assembly hall. Excavation ongoing as of 2015 for expansion of the airport revealed post holes for long houses and a large midden (rubbish pile), giving detailed information about how the inhabitants lived.

A hillfort from the Migration Period (about 500 A.D.) similarly shows that there must have been something to defend in the area. The hillfort is located on Borgklinten, east of Ottersbo and Austrått. Due to Ørlands geographical location at the entrance of the Trondheim fjord it must have been a strategically important place for the exercise of power or to control trade.

Austrått Manor is the municipality's most important historical building. Austrått has been the site of a manor or royal estate since about 1000 A.D. and several historical figures have been associated with the place. At the time of the Battle of Stiklestad, Finn Árnasson was lord of Austrått. His wife was Bergljot (Bergljót Halvdansdóttir), niece of Kings Harald Hardrada and Olaf II of Norway. Finn's daughter Ingibiorg Finnsdottir became the wife of Thorfinn, earl of the Orkney Islands.

Lady Inger of Austrått (1473–1555) was at the time Norway's most prominent woman. Through inheritance, use of force and other methods Lady Inger increased her wealth and controlled vast land areas. After the death of her husband, Niels Henrikssøn (ca. 1458–1523), she had strong political and economical influence. Henrik Ibsen's romantic portrayal of her as an idealistic freedom fighter is probably not accurate. It is believed that Lady Inger and Niels started what later Ove Bjelke completed: the Austrått Manor. Ove Bjelke (1611–1674) built Austrått Manor the way we see it today. It is a manor with a sense of symmetry and symbols of power and inspired by the builder's time as a student in Italy. The complex, which was built around a church from the Middle Ages, was probably completed around 1656. The manor was consumed by a fire in 1916, but was later restored—a process which was completed in 1961.

Storfosen Manor (Storfosen Gods) also has a long history dating at least as far back as the 12th century. This manor was a royal estate in the 14th century, but was for the next 300 years part of the land holdings of the rulers at Austrått. Lady Inger lived here as a widow. The property is still amongst the biggest farms in the county. Ruins of a 14th-century chapel is located on the property. The manor changed hands in 2014; the new owners are developing the manor into a hotel.

Uthaug Manor (Uthaugsgården) owned by the Lund family from 1829, developed throughout the 19th century to become a full-fledged trading company comprising trade in fish and other commodities as well as a guesthouse, post office, telegraph and a steamship terminal. The place is today occupied by Museet Uthaugsgården and is unique due to the preservation of many rooms and items in their original condition.

At the same time Ørland was the center for a large coastal district with a district judge and tax collector. The district comprised the area from Hemne to Osen including islands to the west. Starting in 1837 the church parish and the municipality included what is today Ørland, Bjugn and the northern parts of Agdenes municipalities. The Savings bank, established in 1849, covered the same area. In 1853, Bjugn incorporated as a separate municipality. Ørland got its present-day shape and size when Agdenes incorporated into its own municipality in 1896.

The people of Ørland has for generations made their living as coastal farmers who combined farming, coastal fishing, and seasonal work at the fishing grounds further out. Ørland has had its own cheese and milk factory since 1878 and a grain mill predating written records. Later fish processing has been part of the mix.

With the arrival of the 20th century came new problems and new opportunities. The German occupation was a boom time for workers who built the airport. The airport changed the landscape significantly. Several prison camps, in places like Austrått, Uthaug and Hovde, made a strong impression on the population leading to Fosen being a key area for Norwegian-Yugoslav relations. After the war, in 1954, the airport reopened as a NATO facility. The establishment of the airport the air force became a good opportunity for jobs and careers for the locals. As of 2016, the Ørland air force base is the biggest employer in the Fosen. The military employees are often in relationships where both partners have high income jobs.

Ørland had its own dairy school from 1894 to 2001, school of home economics since 1923 and vocational school since 1960. The latter two were merged into the Fosen videregående skole in 2000.

== Sister Cities ==
Ørland has sister city agreements with:

(United States) Glendale, Arizona, USA	Koceljeva, Serbia

== Notable people ==
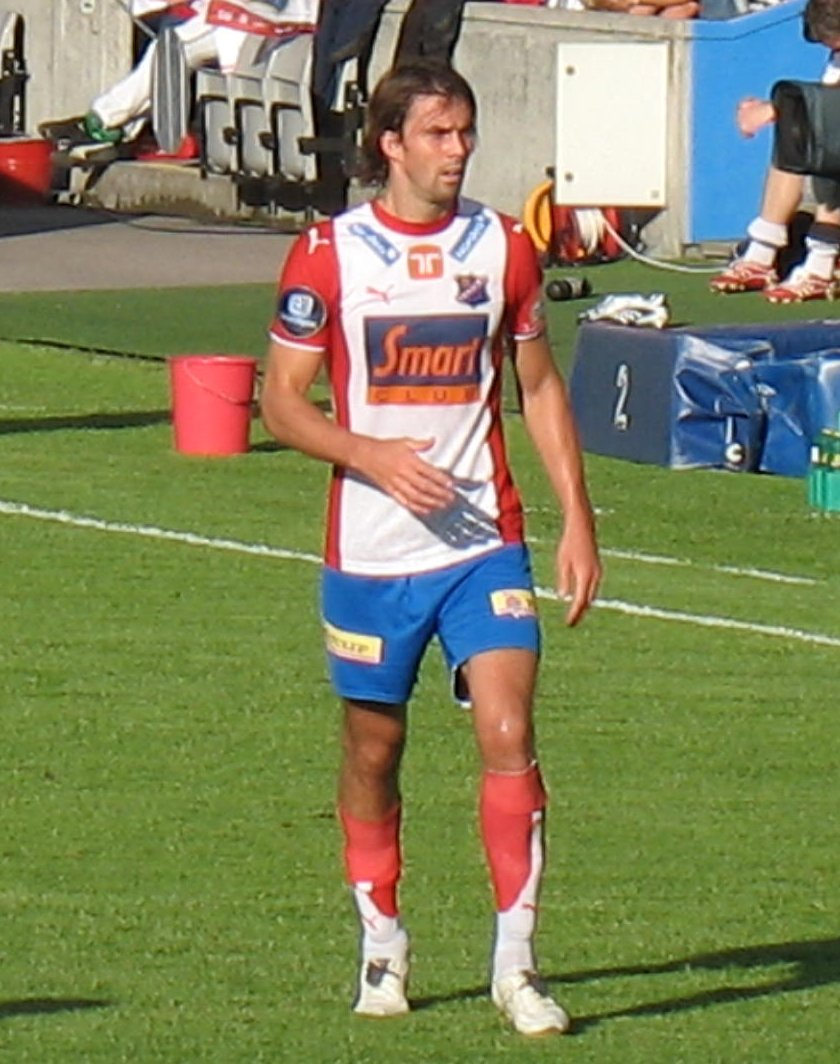
Jo Tessem, 2007

- John Aalberg (born 1960), a Norwegian-born American skier
- Håkon Grjotgardsson (ca.860–870 – ca.900–920), the first Earl of Lade and an ally of King Harald Fairhair of Norway; lived in Ørland
- Otte Rømer (ca.1330–1409), a nobleman, state councilor, and landowner who established his family ownership of the Austrått estate
- Inger Ottesdotter Rømer (ca.1475–1555), the wealthiest landowner in Norway, ultimate heiress of the noble Rømer family, and a political intriguer
- Peter Høier Holtermann (1820 in Austrått – 1865), a Norwegian architect
- Jørleif Uthaug (1911 in Brekstad – 1990), a Norwegian illustrator, painter, and sculptor
- Oddbjørn Hågård (1940 in Ørland – 2013), a Norwegian politician and Mayor of Ørland from 1975–1983
- Hallgeir Grøntvedt (born 1959), a Norwegian politician and Mayor of Ørland from 1997–1999 and 2003–2015
- Tom Nordtvedt (born 1963), a retired Paralympic swimmer and twice silver medallist who lives in Ørland
- Jo Tessem (born 1972 in Brekstad), a Norwegian footballer with over 400 club caps

== Media gallery ==
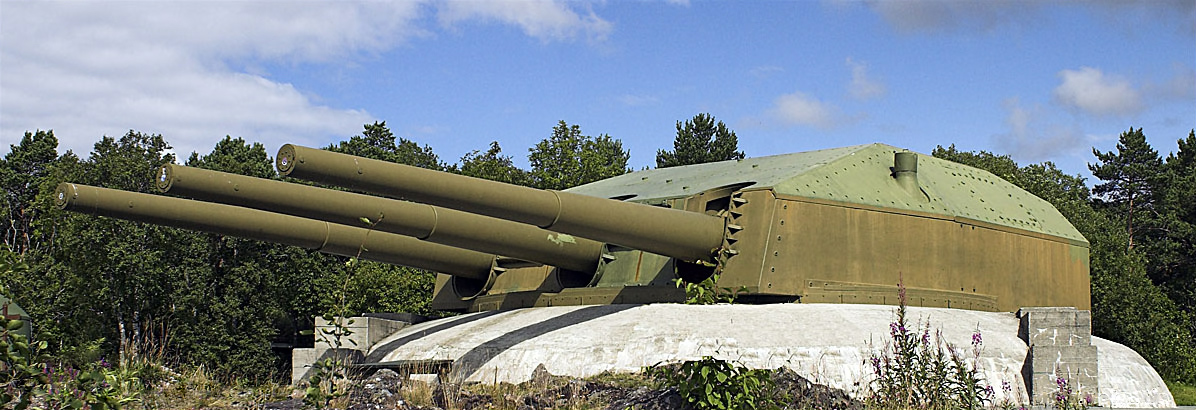
Austrått Fort, gun turret was taken from the German battleship Gneisenau.

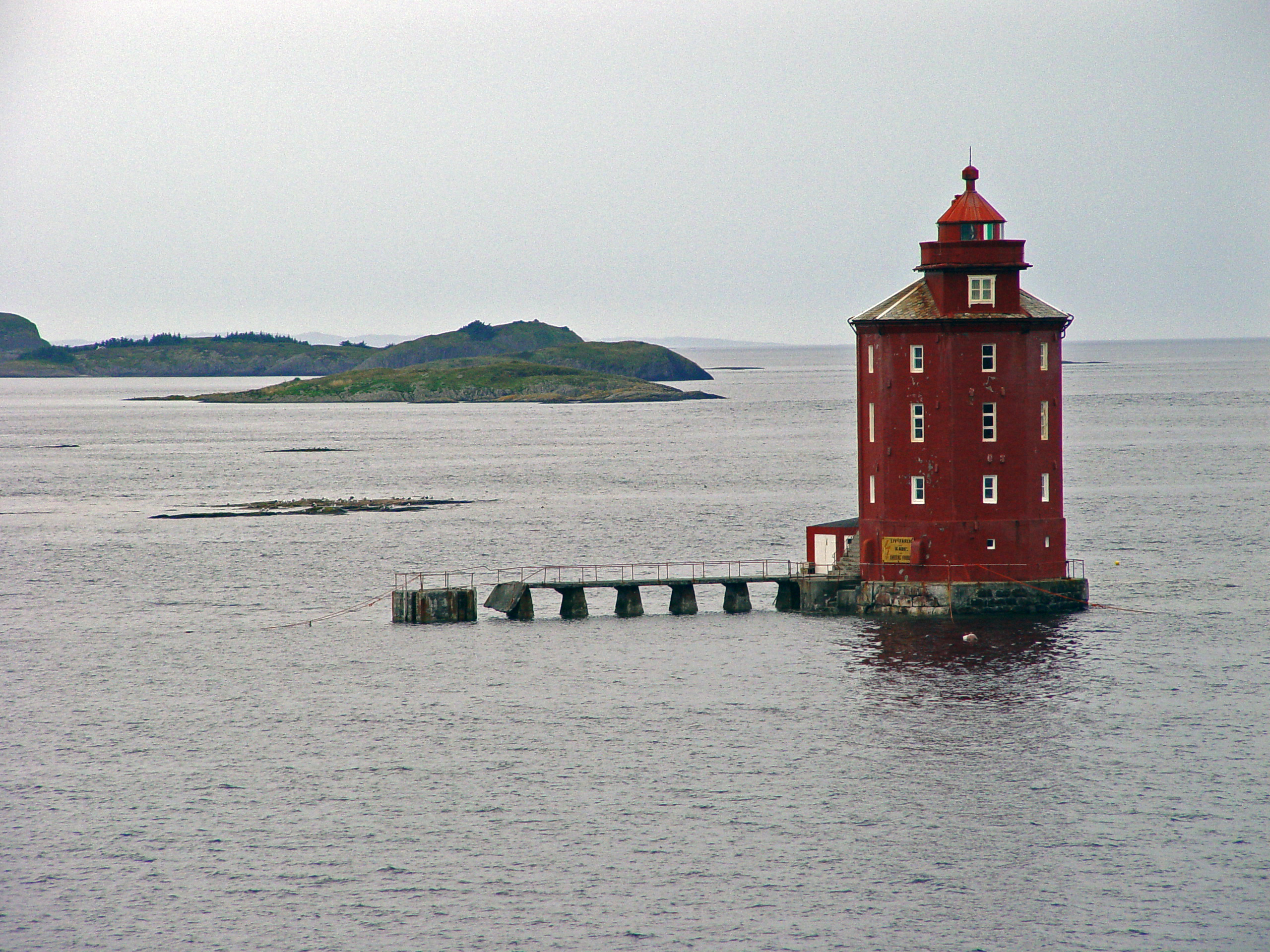
Kjeungskjær lighthouse, which can be rented

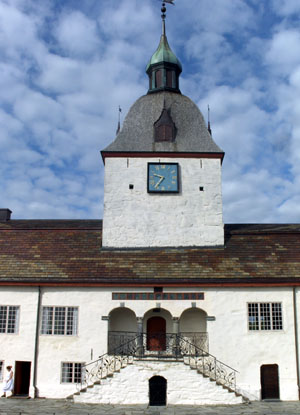
Part of the Manor of Austrått (Austråttborgen).

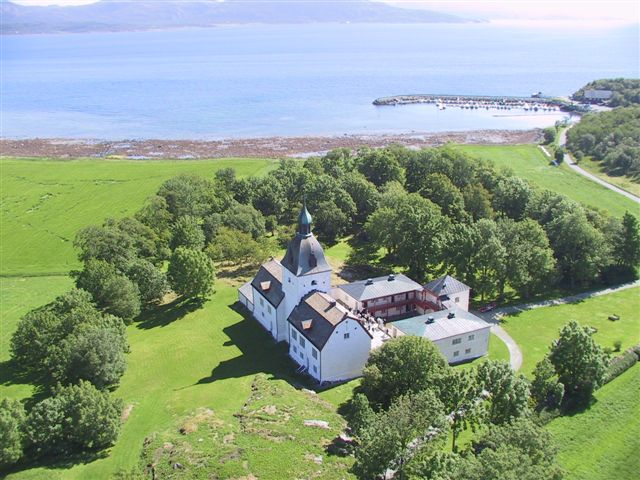
Manor of Austrått and Trondheimsfjord.

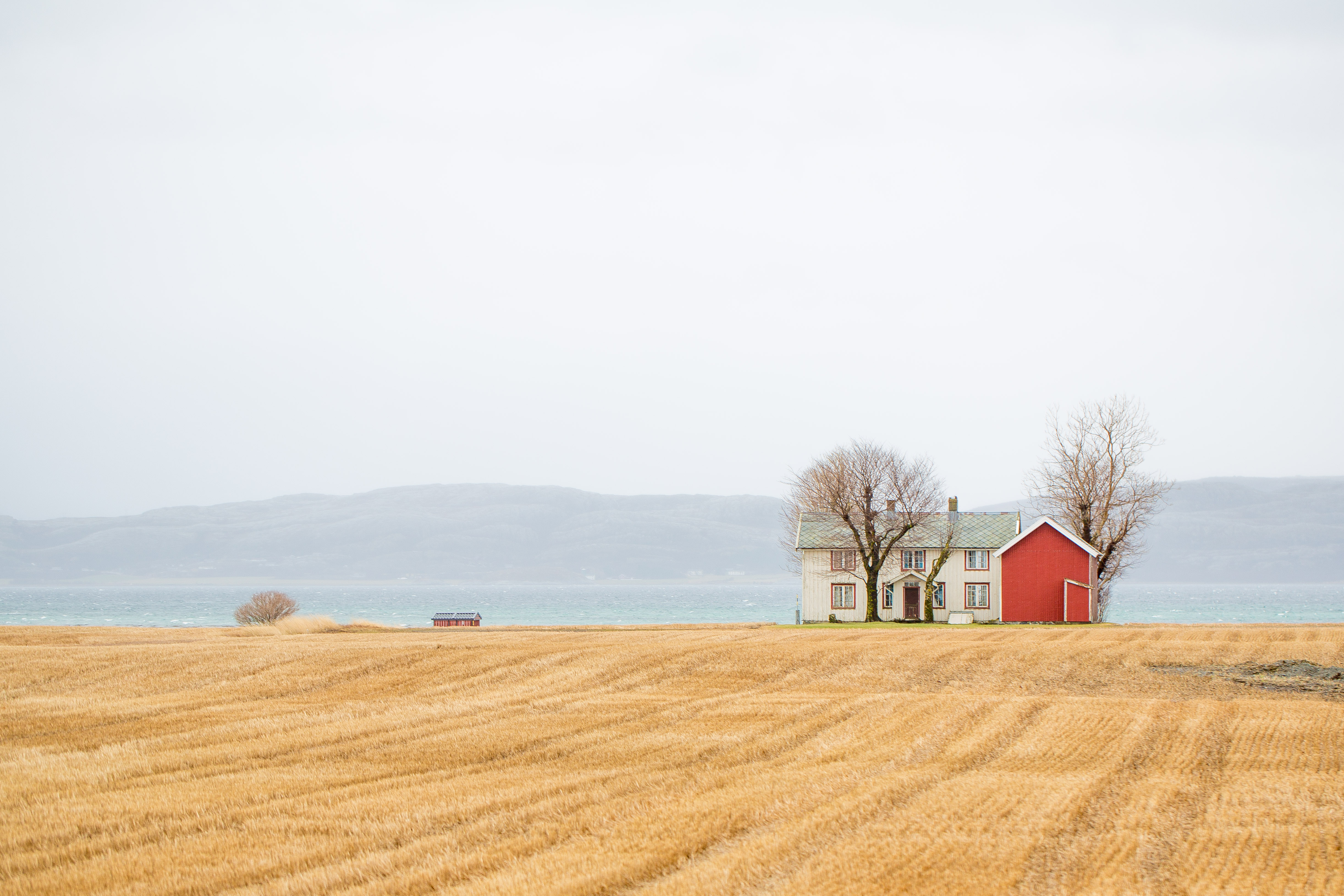
A farm in the characteristic flat landscape of Ørland

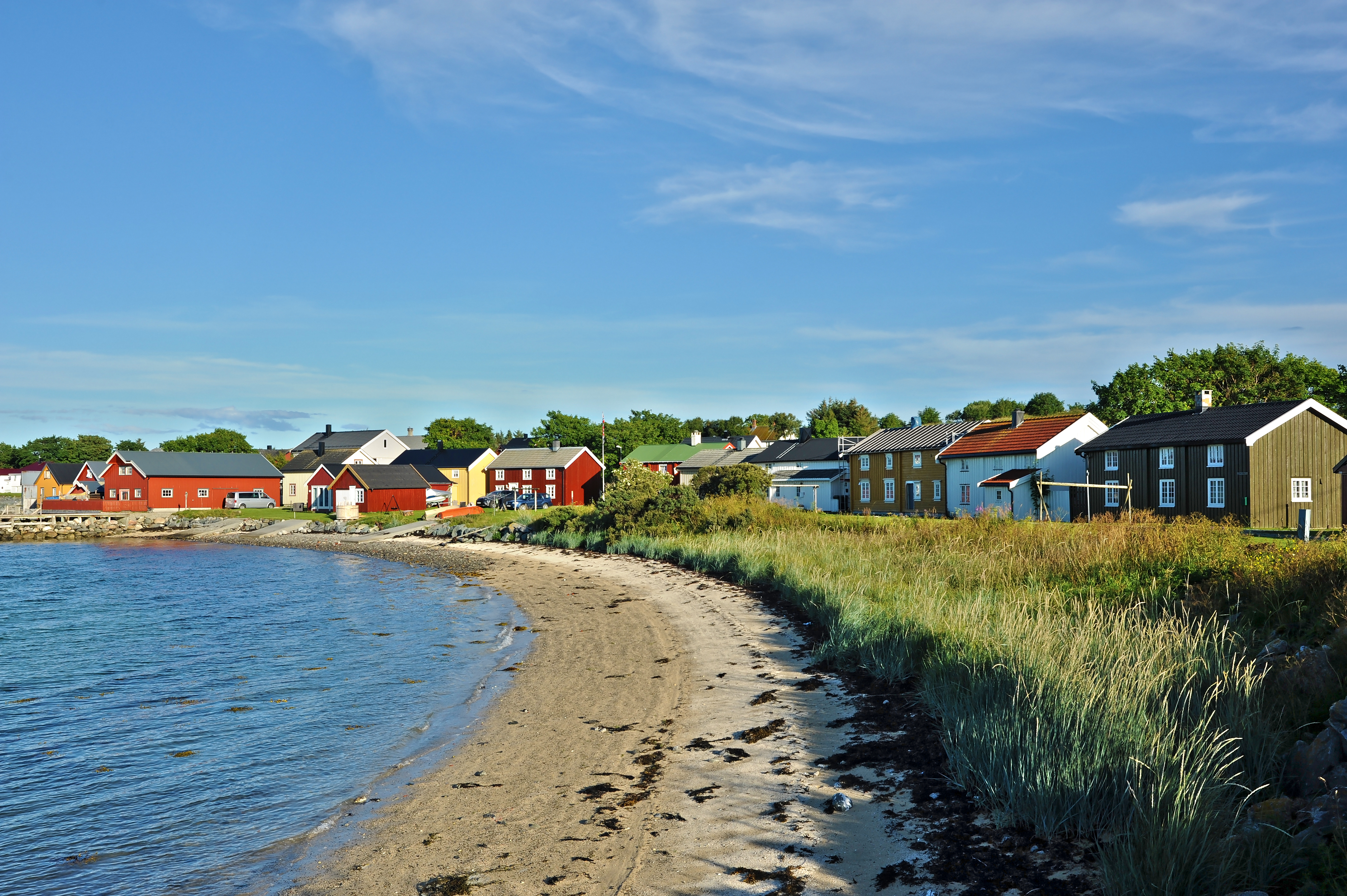
Uthaug Sjøgata
