= Namdal District Court =

Former district court in Namsos, Norway

- Namdal tingrett
- 64.4655774°N 11.4965992°E
- Established: 1591
- Dissolved: 12 April 2021
- Jurisdiction: Namdalen
- Location: Namsos, Norway
- Coordinates: 64.4655774°N 11.4965992°E
- Appeals to: Frostating Court of Appeal

Namdal District Court (Norwegian: Namdal tingrett) was a district court in Trøndelag county, Norway. The court was based in the town of Namsos in Namsos Municipality. The court existed until 2021. It served the municipalities of Flatanger, Fosnes, Grong, Høylandet, Leka, Lierne, Namsos, Namsskogan, Nærøy, Overhalla, Røyrvik, and Vikna. Cases from this court could be appealed to Frostating Court of Appeal.

The court was a court of first instance. Its judicial duties were mainly to settle criminal cases and to resolve civil litigation as well as bankruptcy. The administration and registration tasks of the court included death registration, issuing certain certificates, performing duties of a notary public, and officiating civil wedding ceremonies. Cases from this court were heard by a combination of professional judges and lay judges.

== History ==
This court was established in 1591 when district courts were originally established in Norway. On 26 April 2021, the court was merged with the Fosen District Court, Inntrøndelag District Court, and Sør-Trøndelag District Court to create the new Trøndelag District Court.
