= Aage Thor Falkanger Sr. =

Norwegian judge (1902–1981)

- Born: 9 December 1902; Trondhjem, Norway
- Died: 4 January 1981 (aged 78)
- Burial place: Alstadhaug, Levanger
- Education: Royal Frederick University (cand.jur., 1925)
- Occupation: judge
- Spouse: Haldis Brun (m. 1933)
- Children: Thor Falkanger
- Parents: Thor Falkanger (father); Aagot Kamstrup (mother)

Aage Thor Falkanger (9 December 1902 – 4 January 1981) was a Norwegian judge.

He was born in Trondhjem as a son of wholesaler Thor Falkanger (1858–1932) and Aagot Kamstrup (1872–1902). In 1933 he married curate's daughter Haldis Brun. Their son Thor Falkanger became a law professor, and Aage Thor Falkanger became a Supreme Court Justice at the age of 45.

Aage Thor Falkanger finished his secondary education in 1921, and graduated from the Royal Frederick University with the cand.jur. degree in 1925. He was a deputy judge in Solør District Court from 1927 to 1931, secretary in the National Insurance Administration from 1931 to 1934 and police superintendent in the police districts Hordaland (1934–1936), Flekkefjord (1936–1940) and Bergen (1940–1941). During the occupation of Norway by Nazi Germany, in 1941, he was fired from his job by the occupying Nazi authorities. He fled to the United Kingdom where he was an assistant secretary for the Ministry of Justice and the Police-in-exile until 1945.

From 1945 to 1946 he was a state attorney during the legal purge in Norway after World War II. He was appointed as a judge in Hålogaland Court of Appeal in 1946, district stipendiary magistrate in Fosen District Court in 1947 and in Stjør- and Verdal District Court in 1952. He died in January 1981 and was buried in Alstadhaug, Levanger.
