= Sør-Trøndelag District Court =

Former district court in Trondheim, Norway

- Sør-Trøndelag tingrett
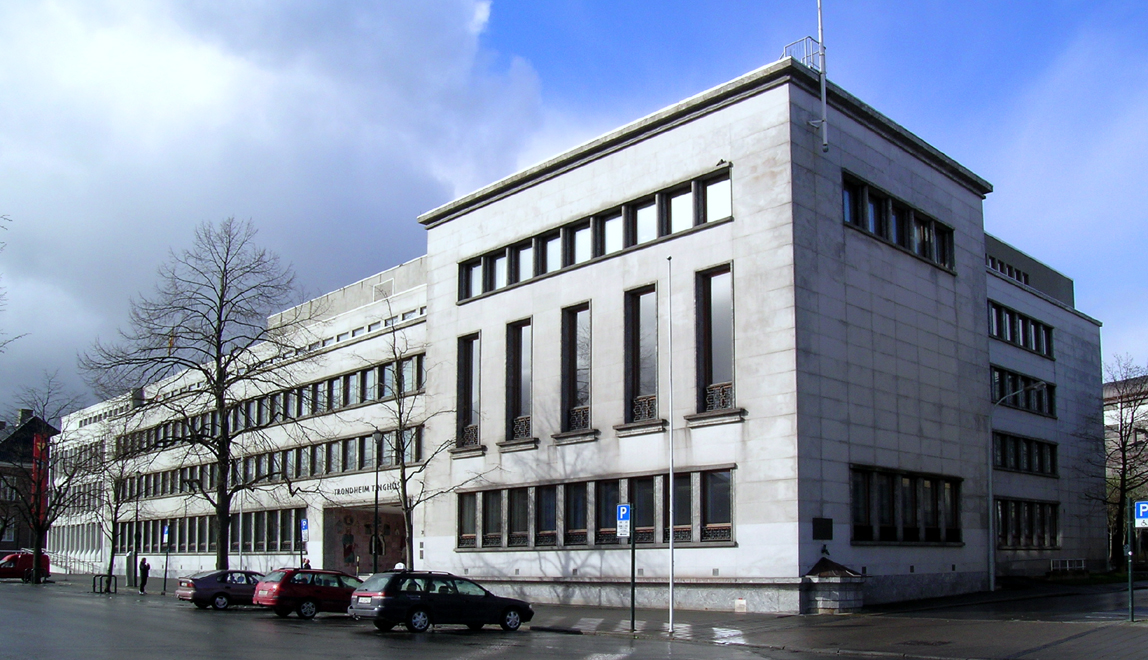
- Trondheim Courthouse
- 63.4295°N 10.3948°E
- Established: 1 Jan 2003
- Dissolved: 12 April 2021
- Jurisdiction: Sør-Trøndelag
- Location: Trondheim, Norway
- Coordinates: 63.4295°N 10.3948°E
- Appeals to: Frostating Court of Appeal

Sør-Trøndelag District Court (Norwegian: Sør-Trøndelag tingrett) was a district court in Trøndelag county, Norway. The court was based in the city of Trondheim at the Trondheim courthouse. The court existed from 2003 until 2021. It had jurisdiction over the municipalities of Trondheim, Malvik, Klæbu, Selbu, Tydal, Røros, Holtålen, Midtre Gauldal, Oppdal, Rennebu, Melhus, Meldal, Skaun, Orkdal, Agdenes, Snillfjord, and Hemne. Cases from this court could be appealed to Frostating Court of Appeal. The chief judge (Norwegian: sorenskriver) was Leif Otto Østerbø.

The court was a court of first instance. Its judicial duties were mainly to settle criminal cases and to resolve civil litigation as well as bankruptcy. The administration and registration tasks of the court included death registration, issuing certain certificates, performing duties of a notary public, and officiating civil wedding ceremonies. Cases from this court were heard by a combination of professional judges and lay judges.

== History ==
This court was established on 1 January 2003 upon the merger of the three smaller district courts: Gauldal District Court, Orkdal District Court, and Midt-Trøndelag District Court. Then, on 1 January 2010, the Trondheim District Court, which served just the city of Trondheim, was merged into this court as well. On 26 April 2021, this court was merged with the Fosen District Court, Inntrøndelag District Court, and Namdal District Court to create the new Trøndelag District Court.
