= Thor Falkanger =

Norwegian professor of law

Thor Falkanger (born 29 September 1934) is a retired Norwegian professor of law.

He was born in Bergen as a son of district stipendiary magistrate Aage Thor Falkanger, Sr. (1902–1981) and Haldis Brun (1911–1988). He grew up in Flekkefjord, and took the cand.jur. degree at the University of Oslo in 1958. He took the dr.juris degree in 1968 on the thesis Leie av skib. It was printed in the journal Arkiv for Sjørett in 1969, and Falkanger edited this journal from 1970 to 1982. In 1970 he was also appointed professor of jurisprudence at the University of Oslo. He retired in 2004. He has been a member of the Norwegian Academy of Science and Letters since 1980.

He resides at Høvik Verk.
