= Storfosna =

Island in Trøndelag, Norway

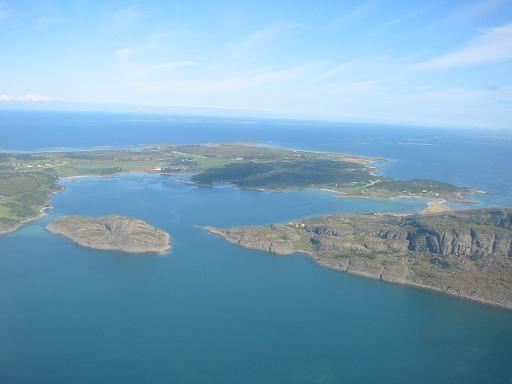
- View of the island (looking north)
- Interactive map of Storfosna

Geography
- Location: Trøndelag, Norway
- Coordinates: 63.6678°N 09.4070°E
- Area: 11 km^{2} (4.2 sq mi)
- Length: 6 km (3.7 mi)
- Width: 3 km (1.9 mi)
- Highest elevation: 158 m (518 ft)
- Highest point: Fosenfjellet

Administration
- Norway
- County: Trøndelag
- Municipality: Ørland Municipality

Storfosna is a populated island in Ørland Municipality in Trøndelag county, Norway. The 11-square-kilometre (4.2 sq mi) island is located between the islands of Kråkvåg and Garten north of the mouth of the Trondheimsfjorden. The traditional district of Fosen is named after this island. There is a large deer population on the island.

The island is connected to the island of Kråkvåg by a causeway and bridge, and is connected to Garten (and the mainland) by a car ferry. The Storfosna Church is located on the island. The local and county governments are planning to build an undersea tunnel connecting Storfosna to the island of Garten (which is connected to the mainland by road).

== See also ==
- List of islands of Norway
