= Bård Olav Røsæg =

Norwegian judge and civil servant (1931–2023)

Bård Olav Røsæg (10 August 1931 – 26 March 2023) was a Norwegian judge and civil servant.

== Biography ==
Bård Olav Røsæg was born in Trondheim, finished his secondary education in 1950 and graduated with the cand.jur. degree in 1957. He worked in the Norwegian Price Directorate in 1958 and as a deputy judge in Ålesund from 1959 to 1960, before being hired in a Trondheim-based lawyer's firm. He was a consultant for the County Governor of Nordland from 1967 to 1971, auxiliary judge in Romsdal District Court from 1971 to 1974 and head clerk for the County Governor of Møre og Romsdal from 1974 to 1977.

From 1977 to 2001 he was the district stipendiary magistrate in Inderøy. He was replaced by Rolf Karset after turning 70 years. He was also an extraordinary presiding judge in Frostating Court of Appeal. In 1995 he applied, unsuccessfully, for the position as Governor of Svalbard.

Røsæg was a member of the Odd Fellows. In both 1999 and 2000, he was prevented from working with cases where other Odd Fellow members were involved. In the first case they were members of the same lodge; in the second case they were members of neighboring lodges.

Røsæg died on 26 March 2023, at the age of 91.
