= Ottersbo =

Village in Ørland Municipality, Norway

Ottarsbu Ottersbo
- Village
- Interactive map of Ottarsbu; Ottersbo
- Location within Trøndelag Location within Norway
- Coordinates: 63.7158°N 09.7712°E
- Country: Norway
- Region: Central Norway
- County: Trøndelag
- District: Fosen
- Municipality: Ørland Municipality

Area
  - Total: 0.29 km^{2} (0.11 sq mi)
- Elevation: 37 m (121 ft)

Population (2024)
  - Total: 404
  - Density: 1,393/km^{2} (3,610/sq mi)
- Time zone: UTC+01:00 (CET)
  - Summer (DST): UTC+02:00 (CEST)
- Post Code: 7140 Opphaug

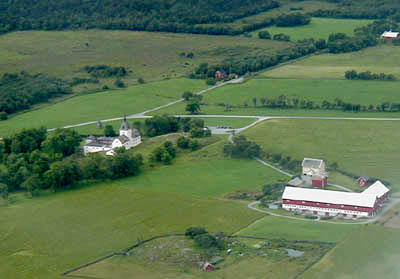

Ottersbo or Ottarsbu is a village in Ørland Municipality in Trøndelag county, Norway. It is located along the Stjørnfjorden, about 1 kilometre (0.62 mi) east of the Austrått manor.

The Ottarsbu residential area was built up during the years 1977–1980. It is a peaceful quiet area with approximately 100 houses only about 8 kilometres (5.0 mi) east of the municipal center of Brekstad. The 0.29-square-kilometre (72-acre) village has a population (2024) of 404 and a population density of 1,393 inhabitants per square kilometre (3,610/sq mi).
