= Trøndelag District Court =

First-instance law court in Norway

- Trøndelag tingrett
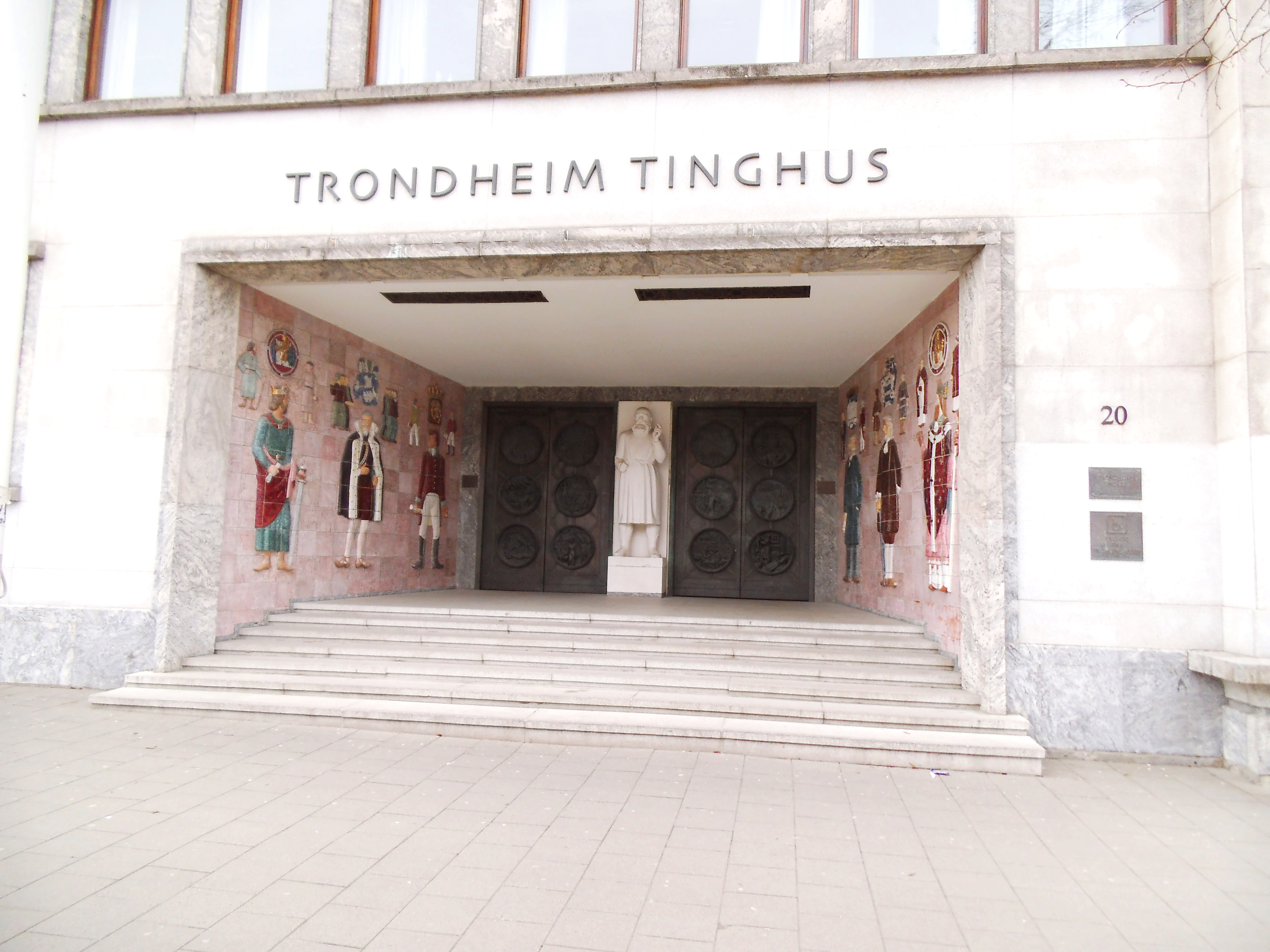
- Trondheim courthouse
- 63°25′46″N 10°23′43″E
- Established: 12 April 2021
- Jurisdiction: Trøndelag, Norway
- Location: Trondheim, Brekstad, Steinkjer, and Namsos
- Coordinates: 63°25′46″N 10°23′43″E
- Appeals to: Frostating Court of Appeal
- Website: Official website

Trøndelag District Court (Norwegian: Trøndelag tingrett) is a district court located in Trøndelag county, Norway. This court is based at four different courthouses which are located in Brekstad, Namsos, Steinkjer, and Trondheim. The court is subordinate to the Frostating Court of Appeal. The court serves the entire county which includes 38 municipalities as follows:

- The courthouse in Brekstad accepts cases from the municipalities of Frøya, Hitra, Indre Fosen, Osen, Ørland, and Åfjord.
- The courthouse in Namsos accepts cases from the municipalities of Flatanger, Grong, Høylandet, Leka, Lierne, Namsos, Namsskogan, Nærøysund, Overhalla, and Røyrvik.
- The courthouse in Steinkjer accepts cases from the municipalities of Frosta, Inderøy, Levanger, Meråker, Snåsa, Steinkjer, Stjørdal, and Verdal.
- The courthouse in Trondheim accepts cases from the municipalities of Heim, Holtålen, Malvik, Melhus, Midtre Gauldal, Oppdal, Orkland, Rennebu, Rindal, Røros, Selbu, Skaun, Trondheim, and Tydal.

The court is led by a chief judge (sorenskriver) and several other judges. The court is a court of first instance. Its judicial duties are mainly to settle criminal cases and to resolve civil litigation as well as bankruptcy. The administration and registration tasks of the court include death registration, issuing certain certificates, performing duties of a notary public, and officiating civil wedding ceremonies. Cases from this court are heard by a combination of professional judges and lay judges.

== History ==
This court was established on 12 April 2021 after the old Fosen District Court, Inntrøndelag District Court, Namdal District Court, and Sør-Trøndelag District Court were all merged into one court. The new district court system continues to use the courthouses from the predecessor courts.
