= Storfosna Church =

Church in Trøndelag, Norway

- Storfosna kirke
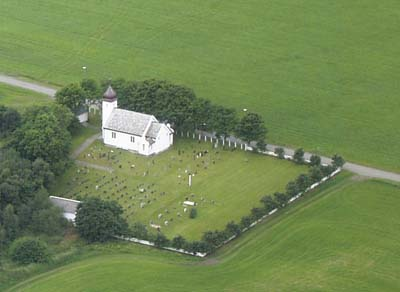
- View of the church
- Storfosna Church
- 63.66286291°N 09.39764097°E
- Location: Ørland Municipality, Trøndelag
- Country: Norway
- Denomination: Church of Norway
- Churchmanship: Evangelical Lutheran

History
- Status: Parish church
- Founded: 1913
- Consecrated: 11 Dec 1913

Architecture
- Functional status: Active
- Architect: Johan Kunig
- Architectural type: Long church
- Completed: 1913 (113 years ago)

Specifications
- Capacity: 150
- Materials: Wood

Administration
- Diocese: Nidaros bispedømme
- Deanery: Fosen prosti
- Parish: Ørland
- Norwegian Cultural Heritage Site
- Type: Church
- Status: Not protected
- ID: 85585

Storfosna Church (Norwegian: Storfosna kirke) is a parish church of the Church of Norway in Ørland Municipality in Trøndelag county, Norway. It is located on the island of Storfosna. It is one of the churches for the Ørland parish which is part of the Fosen prosti (deanery) in the Diocese of Nidaros. The white, wooden church was built in a long church style in 1913 using plans drawn up by the architect Johan Kunig. The church seats about 150 people. The church has about 12 scheduled Sunday worship services per year.

== History ==
The earliest existing historical records of the church date back to the year 1239 in the saga Hákonar saga Hákonarsonar. It is believed that the church was built and consecrated in the year 1236. The church is mentioned again in 1354 in written records. After that, however, there are no other records of the church and then church appears to have been closed and in ruins long before the 1700s. During the late-1700s, there are stories of a stone cellar being built on the island using old stones from a collapsed church.

Around the year 1880, the people on the island of Storfosna requested their own cemetery be built. Permission was granted and one was built about 350 metres (1,150 ft) west of the medieval church site on some donated land. In 1887, the people began asking for their own church building as well. A new church was built in 1913 and consecrated on 11 December 1913.

== See also ==
- List of churches in Nidaros
