= Inderøy District Court =

Former district court in Norway

- Inderøy tingrett
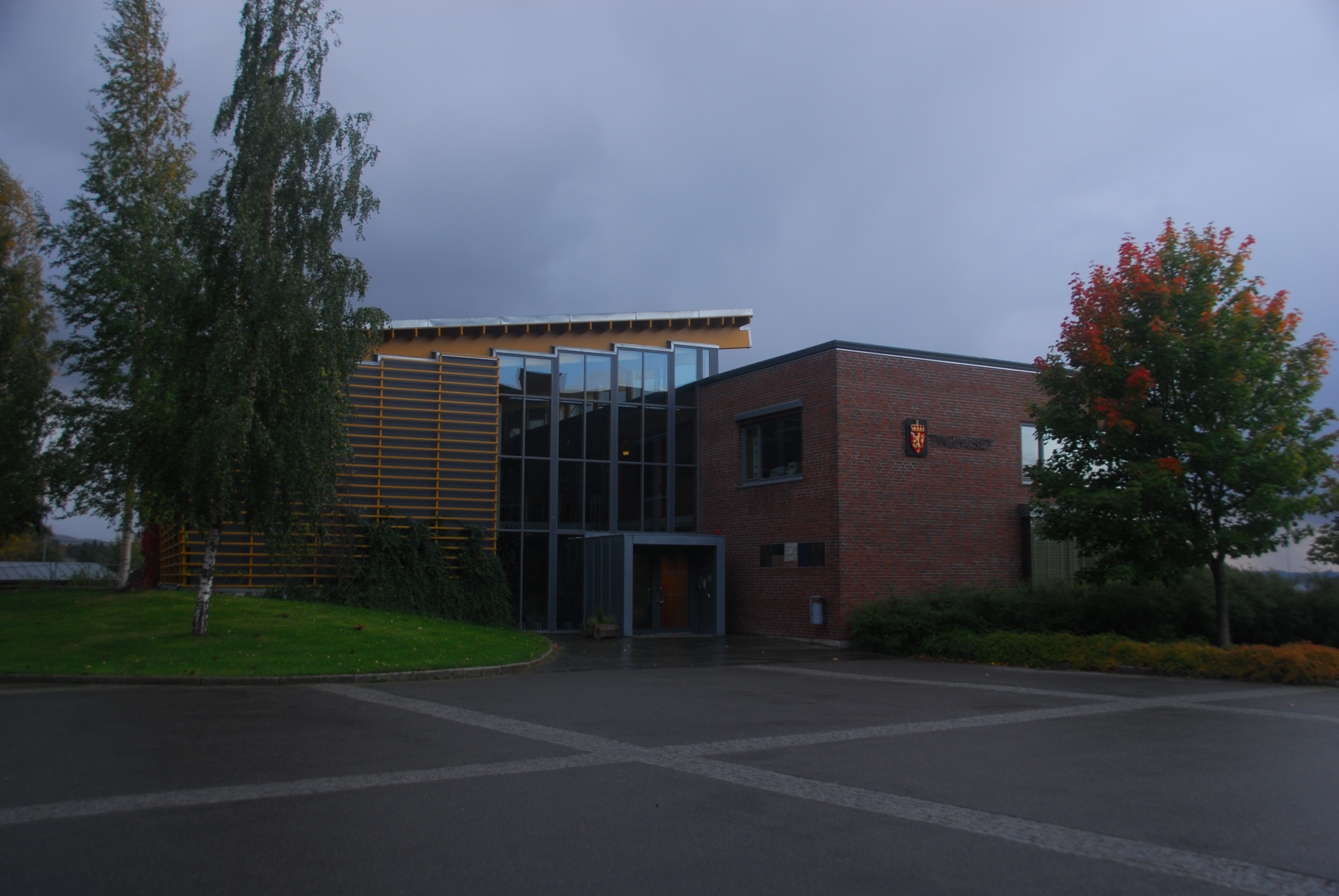
- Courthouse in Steinkjer
- 60°59′07″N 9°14′12″E
- Established: 1635
- Dissolved: 1 Jan 2011
- Jurisdiction: Central Nord-Trøndelag
- Location: Steinkjer, Norway
- Coordinates: 60°59′07″N 9°14′12″E
- Appeals to: Frostating Court of Appeal

Inderøy District Court (Norwegian: Inderøy tingrett) was a district court in Nord-Trøndelag county, Norway. The court was based in the town of Steinkjer. The court existed from 1635 until 2021. It had jurisdiction over the municipalities of Steinkjer, Inderøy, Snåsa, Mosvik, Verran, and Namdalseid. Cases from this court could be appealed to Frostating Court of Appeal. Despite being named "Inderøy", the court was actually located in the neighboring Steinkjer Municipality. This court had one professional judge (the chief judge) and one deputy judge, plus an administration of five people. In 2006, the court handled 280 criminal cases and 70 civil cases plus summary procedures.

The court was a court of first instance. Its judicial duties were mainly to settle criminal cases and to resolve civil litigation as well as bankruptcy. The administration and registration tasks of the court included death registration, issuing certain certificates, performing duties of a notary public, and officiating civil wedding ceremonies. Cases from this court were heard by a combination of professional judges and lay judges.

== History ==
The institution was established in 1635. It is not known where the court met until 1792, when it used the Bjørken Store farm near Gangstadhaugen in present-day Inderøy Municipality. In 1813 it was moved to the Vika farm at Sakshaug (still in Inderøy Municipality). In 1856, the court was relocated to Steinkjer Municipality, but it is not known where in Steinkjer it was located between 1856 and 1920. In 1920, it moved into offices on Kongensgata on the north side of the town. From 1927 to 1940, it was located in Schiefloegården on the south side. This was bombed in 1940 during World War II so it was then moved to its official residence on Johan Bojers gate, then again moved to the Langhammer Villa in Tranabakken. Later, it moved into an office at Sannan, where it was until it moved to the Grand Hotel. From 1962 to 1978, the court was located at Ogndalsveien 2, in the offices of Nord-Trøndelag County Municipality. It was then moved to the head office of Nord-Trøndelag Elektrisitetsverk until 1988, when it moved to the offices of the County Governor of Nord-Trøndelag. In 1997, a new, separate building was built for the court, located next door to the County Governor's office. The new courthouse cost 16.7 million kr.

In 2001 there were efforts to carry out reforms with the court structure in Norway. One result of this reform was that on 1 January 2011, this court was merged with the neighboring Stjør- and Verdal District Court, located in the town of Levanger, and together they would form the new "Inntrøndelag District Court".

=== Chief judges ===
The following people have been chief judge at Inderøy District Court:

- 1635–1662: Eske Madsen
- 1662–1662: Peder Nielsen
- 1662–1672: Lauge Hanssen
- 1672–1676: Godse Pedersen
- 1676–1680: Christen Jacobsen
- 1680–1719: Niels Olufsen Vind
- 1719–1733: Tonas Jacobsen
- 1733–1776: Peter Rosted
- 1776–1789: Peter Andres Rosted
- 1789–1802: Michael Strøm
- 1808–1813: Peter Hanning Hammer
- 1813–1818: Peder Martin Ottesen
- 1818–1829: Peder Daniel Klykken
- 1830–1856: Christen Styhr Hannestad
- 1856–1869: Bernt Olaus Anker
- 1870–1880: Hans Jensenius Engelsen
- 1880–1890: Claus Andreas Urbye
- 1890–1912: F. Dietrichson Bøchmann
- 1912–1924: Isak Moe
- 1924–1932: Nils Thune
- 1933–1946: Asbjørn Lindboe
- 1946–1952: Carl M. Monrad Frøseth
- 1952–1967: Eilert Arff
- 1968–1977: Hjalmar Neiden
- 1977–2001: Bård Olav Røsæg
- 2001–2010: Rolf Karset
