= Hallgeir Grøntvedt =

Norwegian politician (born 1959)

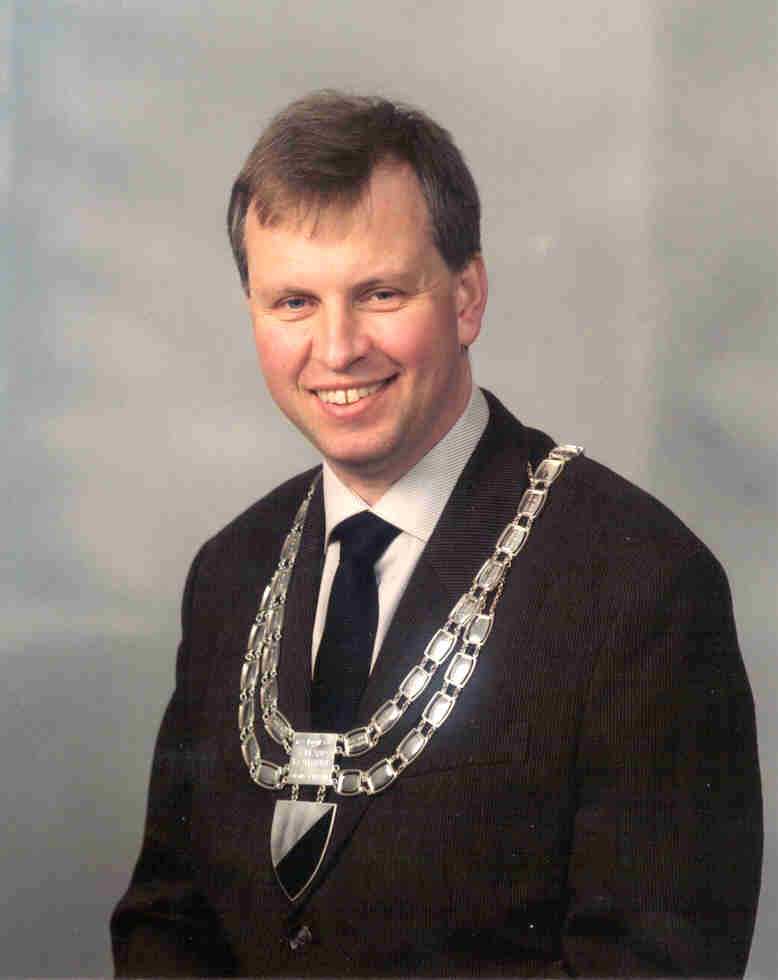

Hallgeir Grøntvedt (born 30 December 1959) is a Norwegian politician for the Centre Party.

He served as a deputy representative to the Parliament of Norway from Sør-Trøndelag during the terms 2009–2013 and 2013–2017.

He was elected to the municipal council of Ørland Municipality in 1987, and has served as mayor from 1997 to 1999 and 2003 to 2015. From 2003 to 2007 he was also a member of Sør-Trøndelag county council.
