= Oddbjørn Hågård =

Norwegian politician (1940–2013)

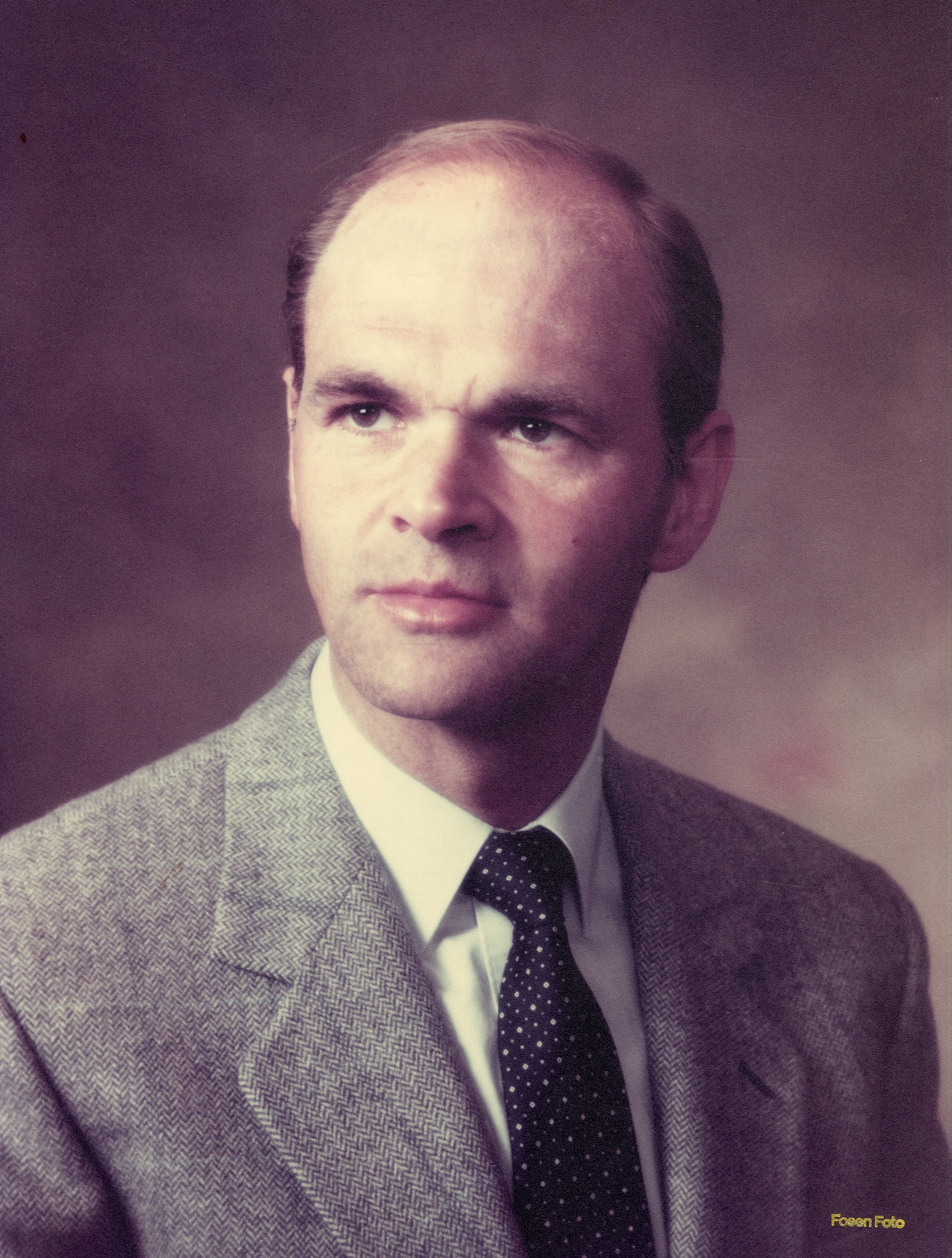

Oddbjørn Hågård (14 July 1940 – 20 February 2013) was a Norwegian politician for the Centre Party.

Born in Ørland Municipality, Hågård took commerce school in 1958, agricultural school in 1962 and artium in 1963. He then enrolled in higher education, graduating from the Norwegian College of Agriculture in 1966. He was a schoolteacher for two years before being hired as municipal agronomist in Åfjord, where he stayed until 1972. He was elected to the municipal council of Åfjord Municipality in 1971 before moving away.

He was the municipal agronomist in Røros from 1972 to 1974, and was then hired as livestock consultant in Ørland Municipality and Bjugn Municipality. From 1980 to 1985 and 1989 to 1994 he was again municipal agronomist, now in Ørland.

While living here was elected into local politics again, serving as mayor of Ørland from 1975 to 1983. He was elected to the Parliament of Norway from Sør-Trøndelag in 1985, but was not re-elected in 1989. He had previously served as a deputy representative during the term 1981–1985. In Parliament he served in the Standing Committee on Agriculture.
