= Kråkvåg =

Island group in Trøndelag, Norway

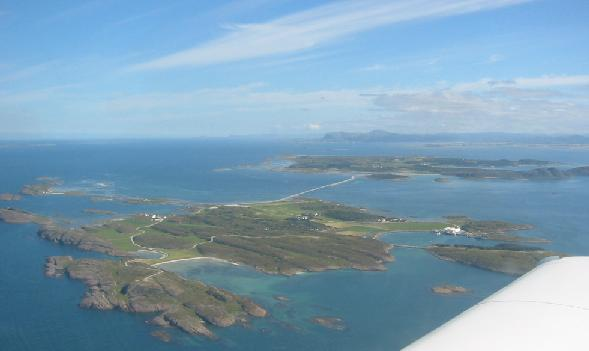
- View of the island with the bridge to Storfosna in the background
- Interactive map of Kråkvåg

Geography
- Location: Trøndelag, Norway
- Coordinates: 63.6439°N 09.3271°E
- Area: 1.4 km^{2} (0.54 sq mi)
- Length: 2 km (1.2 mi)
- Width: 2 km (1.2 mi)
- Highest elevation: 32 m (105 ft)
- Highest point: Høgfjellet

Administration
- Norway
- County: Trøndelag
- Municipality: Ørland Municipality

Kråkvåg is a populated group of islands in Ørland Municipality in Trøndelag county, Norway. The islands are located in the Kråkvågfjorden, just west of the island of Storfosna. The village of Nordbotn on the island of Fjellværsøya in neighboring Frøya Municipality lies about 7 kilometres (4.3 mi) to the west. The island is home to agriculture and fish processing.

The 1.4-square-kilometre (350-acre) island of Kråkvåg is connected to the nearby island of Storfosna by a 1-kilometre-long (0.62 mi) causeway with a 600-metre-long (2,000 ft) bridge in the middle of it. Kråkvåg is the main island of the group, and it is closely surrounded by the islands of Kommersøya, Litjslåttøya, and Storslåttøya. All of the islands are connected by bridges and causeways.

== See also ==
- List of islands of Norway
