= Leksa =

Islands in Trøndelag, Norway

- Interactive map of Leksa

Geography
- Location: Trøndelag, Norway
- Coordinates: 63.5764°N 09.3246°E
- Major islands: Nordleksa and Sørleksa
- Highest elevation: 102.4 m (336 ft)
- Highest point: Jøtudalskallen

Administration
- Norway
- County: Trøndelag
- Municipality: Orkland Municipality

Leksa refers to two islands in the Trondheimsleia strait in Orkland Municipality in Trøndelag county, Norway. Leksa is made up of the smaller north island, Nordleksa, and the larger south island, Sørleksa. The two islands have been connected by a small causeway since 1986. There are about 30 inhabitants between the two islands with about four farms still in use.

Leksa has a store and a post office, and is used as a recreational resort. There is a car ferry from Vernes on the mainland to Nordleksa and ten another one to Garten from Nordleksa. The Sørleksa port is for express catamaran boat between the cities of Trondheim and Kristiansund. On Sørleksa there is a small fishing harbour with a breakwater whose construction work was finished in 1978.

During World War II, there were about 300 German soldiers stationed at Leksa, and there were also 60-70 Polish and Russian prisoners of war who were imprisoned here for about 2 years. They built some fortifications here on the west side of the island at Gangstua which were called Leksa Kystbatteri. Ruins of the fortifications are still visible today.

== See also ==
- List of islands of Norway
