= Brekstad =

Town in Trøndelag, Norway

- Town/City
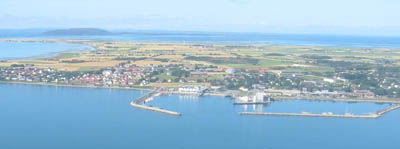
- View of the town
- Interactive map of Brekstad
- Location within Trøndelag Location within Norway
- Coordinates: 63.6870°N 09.6654°E
- Country: Norway
- Region: Central Norway
- County: Trøndelag
- District: Fosen
- Municipality: Ørland Municipality
- Established as
- Town (By): 2005

Area
  - Total: 1.93 km^{2} (0.75 sq mi)
- Elevation: 6 m (20 ft)

Population (2024)
  - Total: 2,437
  - Density: 1,263/km^{2} (3,270/sq mi)
- Time zone: UTC+01:00 (CET)
  - Summer (DST): UTC+02:00 (CEST)
- Post Code: 7130 Brekstad

Brekstad is a town in Ørland Municipality in Trøndelag county, Norway. It is located along the Trondheimsfjord at the entrance to the Stjørnfjorden. The town is located about 5 kilometres (3.1 mi) south of the village of Uthaug and about 7 kilometres (4.3 mi) west of the villages of Austrått and Ottersbo.

The 1.93-square-kilometre (480-acre) town has a population (2024) of 2,437 and a population density of 1,263 inhabitants per square kilometre (3,270/sq mi). Brekstad received town status on 8 October 2005, thus becoming the 95th town in Norway.

The major employers in Brekstad are Ørland Main Air Station / Ørland Airport, Mascot Høie linen factory, Coop Fosen, and Tine Midt-Norge. Brekstad hosts one courthouse for the Trøndelag District Court. The Ørland Church and Ørland cultural center are both located in the town.

Brekstad has connections with the Kystekspressen boat to Trondheim, Hitra, Frøya (via bus), Lensvik, Hysnes, and Kristiansund. The Brekstad–Valset Ferry has regular service across the Trondheimsfjord from Brekstad to Valset in Orkland Municipality. There are also road connections to elsewhere in Ørland Municipality.

== History ==
Brekstad post office was established in 1883. Brekstad is also the site of Skjeggehaugen, from the Old Norse word haugr meaning mound. Skjeggehaugen is an ancient burial mound which measures about 50 to 60 metres (160 to 200 ft) across and from 6 to 7 metres (20 to 23 ft) in height. It is located about 60 metres (200 ft) northeast of Ørland Church.

== Shopping and business services ==
Brekstad is a regional center for both shopping and business services. In the city of Brekstad shoppers can visit and enjoy several clothing stores, grocery stores, cafes, lumber & hardware stores, goldsmiths, flower shop, convenience stores, sports stores, gift stores, restaurants, optometry store, health food store, drug store, Asian grocery store, bookshop, banks, office supply, pet supplies, paint store, art galleries, furniture store, bakeries, car dealers and liquor store.

Business services like accountants, attorneys, banks, consultants, advertising agencies, office supplies, auditing, print shops, collection agency and office services are readily available.

== Media gallery ==
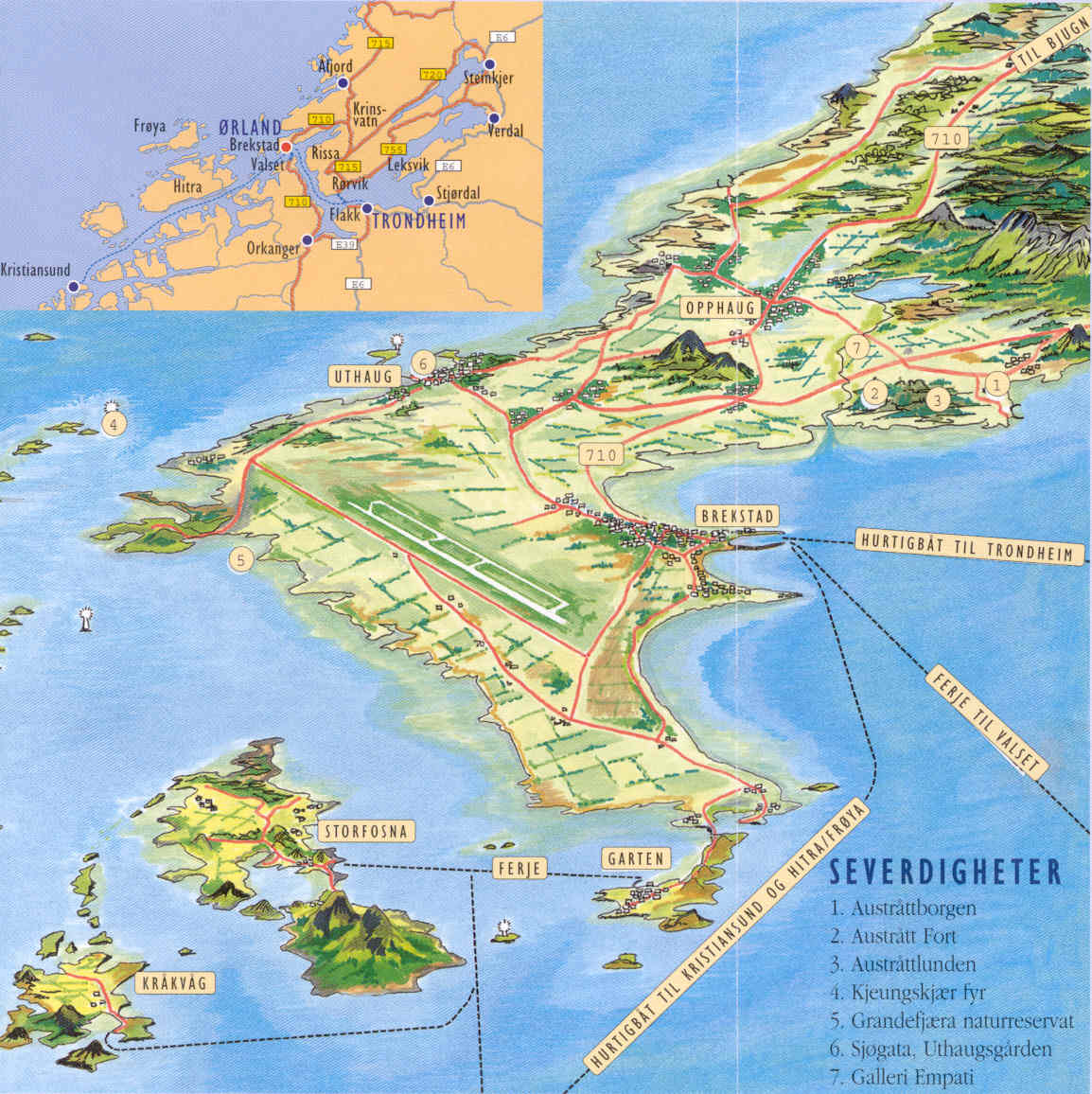
Brekstad area map

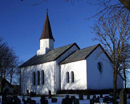
Ørland church

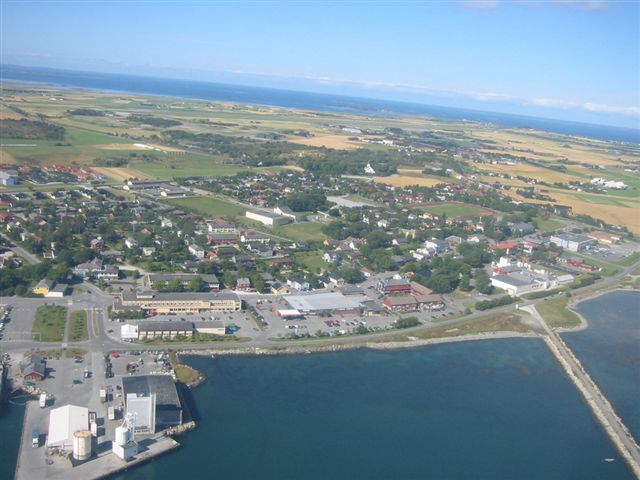
Brekstad, east view

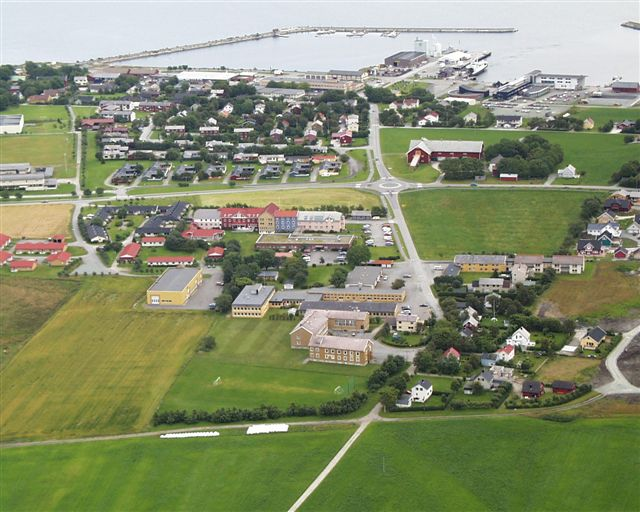
Brekstad, west view

== Climate ==
Climate data for Ørland Main Air Station 1991–2020 (10 m, precipitation days 1961–90, extremes 1955–present)
| Month | Jan | Feb | Mar | Apr | May | Jun | Jul | Aug | Sep | Oct | Nov | Dec | Year |
|---|---|---|---|---|---|---|---|---|---|---|---|---|---|
| Record high °C (°F) | 12.4 (54.3) | 10.9 (51.6) | 14.3 (57.7) | 22.6 (72.7) | 28.9 (84.0) | 30.7 (87.3) | 32.7 (90.9) | 31.8 (89.2) | 25.9 (78.6) | 19.6 (67.3) | 14.2 (57.6) | 12.2 (54.0) | 32.7 (90.9) |
| Mean daily maximum °C (°F) | 3.1 (37.6) | 2.8 (37.0) | 4.7 (40.5) | 8.8 (47.8) | 12.6 (54.7) | 15.3 (59.5) | 17.9 (64.2) | 18 (64) | 14.5 (58.1) | 9.4 (48.9) | 5.6 (42.1) | 3.8 (38.8) | 9.7 (49.4) |
| Daily mean °C (°F) | 1.1 (34.0) | 0.7 (33.3) | 2.1 (35.8) | 5.4 (41.7) | 8.8 (47.8) | 11.7 (53.1) | 14 (57) | 14.1 (57.4) | 11.3 (52.3) | 7 (45) | 3.7 (38.7) | 1.7 (35.1) | 6.8 (44.3) |
| Mean daily minimum °C (°F) | −1.3 (29.7) | −1.7 (28.9) | −0.7 (30.7) | 2.1 (35.8) | 5.3 (41.5) | 8.4 (47.1) | 10.6 (51.1) | 10.7 (51.3) | 8.4 (47.1) | 4.5 (40.1) | 1.4 (34.5) | −0.7 (30.7) | 3.9 (39.0) |
| Record low °C (°F) | −19.8 (−3.6) | −20.5 (−4.9) | −16.5 (2.3) | −8.6 (16.5) | −3.1 (26.4) | 0.1 (32.2) | 3.6 (38.5) | 1 (34) | −3.3 (26.1) | −8 (18) | −15.4 (4.3) | −18 (0) | −20.5 (−4.9) |
| Average precipitation mm (inches) | 88 (3.5) | 82 (3.2) | 76 (3.0) | 55 (2.2) | 52 (2.0) | 69 (2.7) | 63 (2.5) | 91 (3.6) | 110 (4.3) | 104 (4.1) | 92 (3.6) | 111 (4.4) | 993 (39.1) |
| Average precipitation days (≥ 1.0 mm) | 16 | 15 | 15 | 11 | 10 | 12 | 11 | 13 | 14 | 15 | 14 | 16 | 162 |
Source 1:
Source 2:

== See also ==
- List of towns and cities in Norway
