= Stjør- and Verdal District Court =

Former district court in Norway

- Stjør- og Verdal tingrett
- 63°44′46″N 11°17′53″E
- Established: 1591
- Dissolved: 1 Jan 2011
- Jurisdiction: Southeastern Nord-Trøndelag
- Location: Levanger, Norway
- Coordinates: 63°44′46″N 11°17′53″E
- Appeals to: Frostating Court of Appeal

Stjør- and Verdal District Court (Norwegian: Stjør- og Verdal tingrett) was a district court in Nord-Trøndelag county, Norway. The court was based in the town of Levanger. The court existed from 1635 until 2011. It had jurisdiction over the municipalities of Levanger, Stjørdal, Verdal, Frosta, Leksvik, and Meråker. Cases from this court could be appealed to Frostating Court of Appeal. In the court, there work three professional judges, two deputy judges and seven clerks. In 2006, the court dealt with 158 criminal cases, 381 summary procedures and 104 civil cases.

The court was a court of first instance. Its judicial duties were mainly to settle criminal cases and to resolve civil litigation as well as bankruptcy. The administration and registration tasks of the court included death registration, issuing certain certificates, performing duties of a notary public, and officiating civil wedding ceremonies. Cases from this court were heard by a combination of professional judges and lay judges.

== History ==
This court was established in 1591. Historically, the name of the court was Stjør- og Verdal sorenskriveri and later Stjør- og Verdal herredsrett, but on 1 January 2002, the name was changed to Stjør- og Verdal tingrett as part of a new court reform law. On 1 January 2011 this court was merged with the Inderøy District Court to form the new Inntrøndelag District Court which was based in Steinkjer.
