= Bjugn Municipality =

Former municipality in Sør-Trøndelag, Norway

Bjugn Municipality Bjugn kommune
- Former municipality
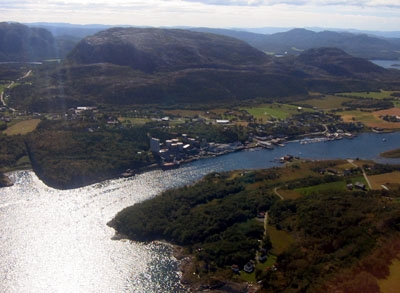

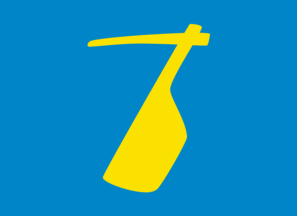
- Flag Coat of arms

- Trøndelag within Norway

- Bjugn within Trøndelag
- Coordinates: 63°48′24″N 09°53′53″E
- Country: Norway
- County: Trøndelag
- District: Fosen
- Established: 1853
  - Preceded by: Ørland Municipality
- Disestablished: 1 Jan 2020
  - Succeeded by: Ørland Municipality
- Administrative centre: Botngård

Government
  - Mayor (2014–2019): Ogne Undertun (Ap)

Area (upon dissolution)
  - Total: 383.82 km^{2} (148.19 sq mi)
  - Land: 355.85 km^{2} (137.39 sq mi)
  - Water: 27.97 km^{2} (10.80 sq mi) 7.3%
  - Rank: #245 in Norway
- Highest elevation: 492.5 m (1,616 ft)

Population (2019)
  - Total: 4,904
  - Rank: #205 in Norway
  - Density: 12.8/km^{2} (33/sq mi)
  - Change (10 years): ▲ +8%
- Demonym: Bjugning

Official language
  - Norwegian form: Bokmål
- Time zone: UTC+01:00 (CET)
  - Summer (DST): UTC+02:00 (CEST)
- ISO 3166 code: NO-5017

Bjugn is a former municipality in Trøndelag county, Norway. The municipality existed from 1853 until its dissolution in 2020 when it was merged into Ørland Municipality. It was part of the Fosen region. The village of Botngård was the administrative centre of Bjugn Municipality. Other villages in Bjugn included Høybakken, Jøssund, Lysøysundet, Nes, Oksvoll, and Vallersund. Bjugn was on the Robek-list in 2015.

At the time of its dissolution in 2020, the 384-square-kilometre (148 sq mi) municipality was the 245th largest by area out of the 422 municipalities in Norway. Bjugn Municipality was the 205th most populous municipality in Norway with a population of 4,904. The municipality's population density was 12.8 inhabitants per square kilometre (33/sq mi) and its population had increased by 8% over the last decade.

== General information ==
The municipality of Bjugn was established in 1853 when it was separated from the large Ørland Municipality. Initially, Bjugn Municipality had 2,903 residents. On 26 March 1870, a royal resolution moved an unpopulated part of Aafjord Municipality to Bjugn Municipality. On 1 January 1899, Bjugn Municipality was divided into three municipalities. The western coastal district (population: 1,285) became Nes Municipality. The southern district (population: 2,166) became Skjørn Municipality. The rest of the municipality (population: 1,256) remained as (a much smaller) Bjugn Municipality.

During the 1960s, there were many municipal mergers across Norway due to the work of the Schei Committee. On 1 January 1964, a large municipal merger took place. Nes Municipality (population: 1,107), Jøssund Municipality (population: 1,917), Bjugn Municipality (population: 1,240), and the northern part of Stjørna Municipality (population: 676) were all merged to create a new, larger Bjugn Municipality. The population of Bjugn Municipality then increased from 1,240 to 4,940.

On 1 January 2018, the municipality switched from the old Sør-Trøndelag county to the new Trøndelag county.

On 1 January 2020, the neighboring Bjugn Municipality and Ørland Municipality merged to become a new, larger Ørland Municipality. The administrative centre of the new municipality was determined to be the village of Bjugn.

=== Name ===
The municipality is named after the old Bjugn farm (Old Norse: Bjugn) since the first Bjugn Church was built there. The name is derived from the Old Norse word bjúgr which means "bent" or "crooked", probably referring to the bent/crooked path of the local fjord, the Bjugnfjorden.

=== Coat of arms ===
The coat of arms was granted on 17 February 1989 and it was in use until the municipality was dissolved on 1 January 2020. The official blazon is "Azure, a rudder Or" (Norwegian: I blått et gull ror). This means the arms have a blue field (background) and the charge is a rudder. The rudder has a tincture of Or which means it is commonly colored yellow, but if it is made out of metal, then gold is used. The blue color in the field and the rudder design symbolizes the historical importance of fishing in the municipality. The arms were designed by Einar H. Skjervold.

=== Churches ===
The Church of Norway had three parishes (sokn) within Bjugn Municipality. It was part of the Fosen prosti (deanery) in the Diocese of Nidaros.

Churches in Bjugn Municipality
Parish (sokn)	Church name	Location of the church	Year built
Bjugn	Bjugn Church	west of Bjugn	1956
Bjugn	Hegvik Church	Høybakken	1858
Jøssund	Jøssund Church	Jøssund	1875
Nes	Nes Church	Nes	1878
Nes	Tarva Chapel	Nordbuen, Tarva	1972

== Geography ==
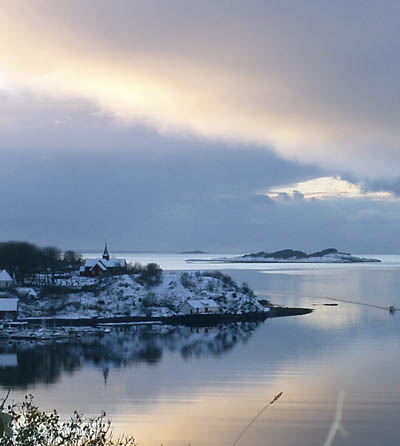
Bjugnfjorden with Bjugn Church

The municipality of Bjugn was located on the Fosen peninsula on the mainland, plus many islands, including the Tarva islands. The Asenvågøy Lighthouse was located in the far north of the municipality. The Bjugnfjorden and Stjørnfjorden were both located partially in Bjugn. The highest point in the municipality was the 492.5-metre (1,616 ft) tall mountain Seksortklumpen.

Neighboring Bjugn was Ørland Municipality to the southwest, Rissa Municipality to the south and southeast, and Åfjord Municipality to the northeast.

There were five nature reserves in Bjugn. Hildremsvatnet Nature Reserve was the largest at 23,441 decares (23.441 km^{2}; 9.051 sq mi) and included several nature types, among these were 9 localities identified as boreal rainforest (see Scandinavian coastal conifer forests).

== Sports ==
The Fosenhallen is an indoor multi-use ice rink located in the municipality. The Fosenhallen was used to host the 2014 World Junior Speed Skating Championships.

== Government ==
While it existed, Bjugn Municipality was responsible for primary education (through 10th grade), outpatient health services, senior citizen services, welfare and other social services, zoning, economic development, and municipal roads and utilities. The municipality was governed by a municipal council of directly elected representatives. The mayor was indirectly elected by a vote of the municipal council. The municipality was under the jurisdiction of the Fosen District Court and the Frostating Court of Appeal.

Bjugn joined the inter-municipal waste management agency Fosen Renovasjon when it was created in 1997.

=== Municipal council ===
The municipal council (Kommunestyre) of Bjugn Municipality was made up of 21 representatives that are elected to four year terms. The tables below show the historical composition of the council by political party.

Bjugn kommunestyre 2015–2019
Party name (in Norwegian)	Number of representatives
Labour Party (Arbeiderpartiet)	9
Progress Party (Fremskrittspartiet)	1
Conservative Party (Høyre)	5
Centre Party (Senterpartiet)	4
Socialist Left Party (Sosialistisk Venstreparti)	1
Local list in Bjugn (Bygdalista i Bjugn)	1
Total number of members:	21
Note: On 1 January 2020, Bjugn Municipality became part of Ørland Municipality.

Bjugn kommunestyre 2011–2015
Party name (in Norwegian)	Number of representatives
Labour Party (Arbeiderpartiet)	12
Progress Party (Fremskrittspartiet)	3
Conservative Party (Høyre)	3
Christian Democratic Party (Kristelig Folkeparti)	3
Centre Party (Senterpartiet)	4
Liberal Party (Venstre)	2
Local list in Bjugn (Bygdalista i Bjugn)	2
Total number of members:	21

Bjugn kommunestyre 2007–2011
Party name (in Norwegian)	Number of representatives
Labour Party (Arbeiderpartiet)	11
Progress Party (Fremskrittspartiet)	3
Conservative Party (Høyre)	2
Christian Democratic Party (Kristelig Folkeparti)	3
Pensioners' Party (Pensjonistpartiet)	1
Centre Party (Senterpartiet)	5
Socialist Left Party (Sosialistisk Venstreparti)	1
Liberal Party (Venstre)	1
Local list in Bjugn (Bygdelista i Bjugn)	2
Total number of members:	29

Bjugn kommunestyre 2003–2007
Party name (in Norwegian)	Number of representatives
Labour Party (Arbeiderpartiet)	9
Progress Party (Fremskrittspartiet)	2
Conservative Party (Høyre)	3
Christian Democratic Party (Kristelig Folkeparti)	1
Coastal Party (Kystpartiet)	1
Pensioners' Party (Pensjonistpartiet)	1
Centre Party (Senterpartiet)	6
Socialist Left Party (Sosialistisk Venstreparti)	3
Liberal Party (Venstre)	1
Local list in Bjugn (Bygdalista i Bjugn)	2
Total number of members:	29

Bjugn kommunestyre 1999–2003
Party name (in Norwegian)	Number of representatives
Labour Party (Arbeiderpartiet)	9
Progress Party (Fremskrittspartiet)	1
Conservative Party (Høyre)	4
Christian Democratic Party (Kristelig Folkeparti)	3
Pensioners' Party (Pensjonistpartiet)	1
Centre Party (Senterpartiet)	6
Socialist Left Party (Sosialistisk Venstreparti)	2
Liberal Party (Venstre)	1
Local list (Bygdeliste)	2
Total number of members:	29

Bjugn kommunestyre 1995–1999
Party name (in Norwegian)	Number of representatives
Labour Party (Arbeiderpartiet)	10
Conservative Party (Høyre)	3
Christian Democratic Party (Kristelig Folkeparti)	1
Centre Party (Senterpartiet)	8
Socialist Left Party (Sosialistisk Venstreparti)	6
Liberal Party (Venstre)	1
Total number of members:	29

Bjugn kommunestyre 1991–1995
Party name (in Norwegian)	Number of representatives
Labour Party (Arbeiderpartiet)	7
Conservative Party (Høyre)	4
Christian Democratic Party (Kristelig Folkeparti)	2
Centre Party (Senterpartiet)	9
Socialist Left Party (Sosialistisk Venstreparti)	3
Liberal Party (Venstre)	1
Bjugn Democratic Election Association (Bjugn Demokratiske Valgforbund)	3
Total number of members:	29

Bjugn kommunestyre 1987–1991
Party name (in Norwegian)	Number of representatives
Labour Party (Arbeiderpartiet)	11
Progress Party (Fremskrittspartiet)	1
Conservative Party (Høyre)	6
Christian Democratic Party (Kristelig Folkeparti)	2
Centre Party (Senterpartiet)	6
Socialist Left Party (Sosialistisk Venstreparti)	1
Liberal Party (Venstre)	1
Bjugn Democratic Election Association (Bjugn Demokratiske Valgforbund)	1
Total number of members:	29

Bjugn kommunestyre 1983–1987
Party name (in Norwegian)	Number of representatives
Labour Party (Arbeiderpartiet)	8
Conservative Party (Høyre)	6
Christian Democratic Party (Kristelig Folkeparti)	2
Centre Party (Senterpartiet)	8
Socialist Left Party (Sosialistisk Venstreparti)	1
Liberal Party (Venstre)	1
Workers', farmers', and fishermens' liste (Arbeidere, jordbrukere og fiskeres liste)	3
Total number of members:	29

Bjugn kommunestyre 1979–1983
Party name (in Norwegian)	Number of representatives
Labour Party (Arbeiderpartiet)	11
Conservative Party (Høyre)	6
Christian Democratic Party (Kristelig Folkeparti)	3
Centre Party (Senterpartiet)	8
Liberal Party (Venstre)	1
Total number of members:	29

Bjugn kommunestyre 1975–1979
Party name (in Norwegian)	Number of representatives
Labour Party (Arbeiderpartiet)	10
Conservative Party (Høyre)	3
Christian Democratic Party (Kristelig Folkeparti)	3
Centre Party (Senterpartiet)	11
Liberal Party (Venstre)	1
Free Voters List (Frie Velgeres Liste)	1
Total number of members:	29

Bjugn kommunestyre 1971–1975
Party name (in Norwegian)	Number of representatives
Labour Party (Arbeiderpartiet)	10
Conservative Party (Høyre)	2
Christian Democratic Party (Kristelig Folkeparti)	3
Centre Party (Senterpartiet)	10
Liberal Party (Venstre)	1
Total number of members:	29

Bjugn kommunestyre 1967–1971
Party name (in Norwegian)	Number of representatives
Labour Party (Arbeiderpartiet)	12
Conservative Party (Høyre)	4
Christian Democratic Party (Kristelig Folkeparti)	3
Centre Party (Senterpartiet)	9
Liberal Party (Venstre)	1
Total number of members:	29

Bjugn kommunestyre 1963–1967
Party name (in Norwegian)	Number of representatives
Labour Party (Arbeiderpartiet)	12
Christian Democratic Party (Kristelig Folkeparti)	3
Joint List(s) of Non-Socialist Parties (Borgerlige Felleslister)	14
Total number of members:	29
Note: On 1 January 1964, Jøssund Municipality and Nes Municipality became part of Bjugn Municipality.

Bjugn herredsstyre 1959–1963
Party name (in Norwegian)	Number of representatives
Labour Party (Arbeiderpartiet)	6
Conservative Party (Høyre)	1
Christian Democratic Party (Kristelig Folkeparti)	1
Centre Party (Senterpartiet)	4
Liberal Party (Venstre)	1
Total number of members:	13

Bjugn herredsstyre 1955–1959
Party name (in Norwegian)	Number of representatives
Labour Party (Arbeiderpartiet)	4
Conservative Party (Høyre)	2
Christian Democratic Party (Kristelig Folkeparti)	1
Farmers' Party (Bondepartiet)	5
Liberal Party (Venstre)	1
Total number of members:	13

Bjugn herredsstyre 1951–1955
Party name (in Norwegian)	Number of representatives
Labour Party (Arbeiderpartiet)	4
Conservative Party (Høyre)	2
Christian Democratic Party (Kristelig Folkeparti)	1
Farmers' Party (Bondepartiet)	4
Liberal Party (Venstre)	1
Total number of members:	12

Bjugn herredsstyre 1947–1951
Party name (in Norwegian)	Number of representatives
Labour Party (Arbeiderpartiet)	4
Conservative Party (Høyre)	2
Christian Democratic Party (Kristelig Folkeparti)	1
Farmers' Party (Bondepartiet)	4
Liberal Party (Venstre)	1
Total number of members:	12

Bjugn herredsstyre 1945–1947
Party name (in Norwegian)	Number of representatives
Labour Party (Arbeiderpartiet)	5
Christian Democratic Party (Kristelig Folkeparti)	2
Liberal Party (Venstre)	1
Joint List(s) of Non-Socialist Parties (Borgerlige Felleslister)	4
Total number of members:	12

Bjugn herredsstyre 1937–1941*
Party name (in Norwegian)	Number of representatives
Labour Party (Arbeiderpartiet)	4
Conservative Party (Høyre)	3
Farmers' Party (Bondepartiet)	5
Total number of members:	12
Note: Due to the German occupation of Norway during World War II, no elections were held for new municipal councils until after the war ended in 1945.

=== Mayors ===
The mayor (Norwegian: ordfører) of Bjugn Municipality was the political leader of the municipality and the chairperson of the municipal council. Here is a list of people who held this position:

- 1857–1863: Rasmus Gaarder
- 1864–1867: Jacob H. Stuenæs
- 1868–1875: Lorentz Hegstad
- 1876–1881: Christian Jenssen (V)
- 1882–1889: Johan Arnt Hegvik (V)
- 1890–1891: Johan G. Haugen (V)
- 1892–1895: Hilmar M. Romstad (V)
- 1896–1898: Johan Arnt Hegvik (V)
- 1899–1905: Hilmar M. Romstad (V)
- 1906–1916: Johan G. Haugen (V)
- 1916–1922: Størk Hansen (V)
- 1923–1926: Johan Hegvik (V)
- 1926–1931: Claus Lien (Bp)
- 1932–1934: Johan Hegvik (V)
- 1935–1941: Einar Furunes (Bp)
- 1941–1945: Erling Hansen (NS)
- 1945–1945: Gustav Hyllmark (Bp)
- 1945–1945: Einar Furunes (Bp)
- 1946–1975: Alf Nebb (Sp)
- 1976–1983: Bjarne Nilsen (Sp)
- 1984–1987: Alf Nebb (Sp)
- 1988–1993: Morten Lund (Sp)
- 1993–1995: Helen Harsvik (Sp)
- 1995–1999: Arent M. Henriksen (SV)
- 1999–2014: Arnfinn Astad (Ap)
- 2014–2019: Ogne Undertun (Ap)

== See also ==
- List of former municipalities of Norway
