= Bjugn =

Bjugn may refer to:

== Places ==
- Bjugn (village), a village in Ørland Municipality in Trøndelag county, Norway
- Bjugn Municipality, a former municipality in Trøndelag county, Norway
- Bjugn Church, a church in Ørland Municipality in Trøndelag county, Norway

== People ==
- Sissel Solbjørg Bjugn, a Norwegian poet and children's writer

== Other ==
- Bjugn affair, a criminal event in Bjugn, Norway
