= Jøssund Municipality =

Former municipality in Sør-Trøndelag, Norway

Jøssund Municipality Jøssund herred
- Former municipality
- Sør-Trøndelag within Norway

- Jøssund within Sør-Trøndelag
- Coordinates: 63°50′44″N 09°47′40″E
- Country: Norway
- County: Sør-Trøndelag
- District: Fosen
- Established: 1 Jan 1896
  - Preceded by: Aafjord Municipality
- Disestablished: 1 Jan 1964
  - Succeeded by: Bjugn Municipality
- Administrative centre: Jøssund

Government
  - Mayor (1960–1963): Erling Hansen (Ap)

Area (upon dissolution)
  - Total: 79.4 km^{2} (30.7 sq mi)
  - Rank: #547 in Norway
- Highest elevation: 492.5 m (1,616 ft)

Population (1963)
  - Total: 1,915
  - Rank: #455 in Norway
  - Density: 24.1/km^{2} (62/sq mi)
  - Change (10 years): ▼ −0.5%

Official language
  - Norwegian form: Neutral
- Time zone: UTC+01:00 (CET)
  - Summer (DST): UTC+02:00 (CEST)
- ISO 3166 code: NO-1629

Jøssund is a former municipality in the old Sør-Trøndelag county, Norway. The municipality existed from 1896 until its dissolution in 1964. The 79-square-kilometre (31 sq mi) municipality encompassed northern coastal area of the present-day Ørland Municipality in Trøndelag county. The main church for Jøssund was Jøssund Church in the village of Jøssund which was the administrative centre of the municipality. Other villages in Jøssund included Lysøysundet and Vallersund.

Prior to its dissolution in 1964, the 79-square-kilometre (31 sq mi) municipality was the 547th largest by area out of the 689 municipalities in Norway. Jøssund Municipality was the 455th most populous municipality in Norway with a population of about 1,915. The municipality's population density was 24.1 inhabitants per square kilometre (62/sq mi) and its population had decreased by 0.5% over the previous 10-year period.

== General information ==
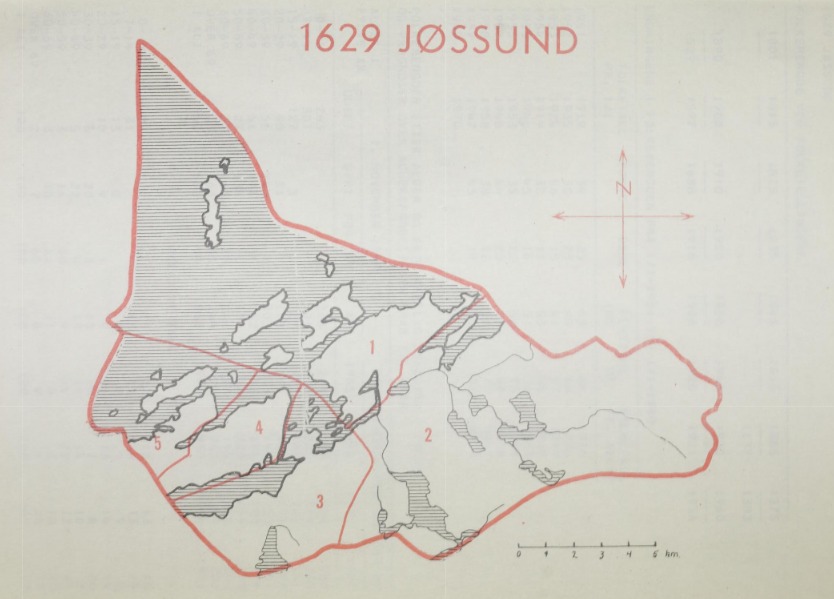
Map of Jøssund in 1960

The municipality of Jøssund was established on 1 January 1896 when it was split off from the large Aafjord Municipality. Initially, Jøssund Municipality had a population of 1,529.

During the 1960s, there were many municipal mergers across Norway due to the work of the Schei Committee. On 1 January 1964, Jøssund Municipality (population: 1,917) was merged with the neighboring Bjugn Municipality (population: 1,240), Nes Municipality (population: 1,107), and the northern part of Stjørna Municipality (population: 676) to form a new, larger Bjugn Municipality.

=== Name ===
The municipality (originally the parish) is named after the old Jøssund farm (Old Norse: Mjórsund). The first element comes from the word mjór which means "narrow" or "thin". The old name did originally start with an "m", but over time the initial letter disappeared from the spelling and pronunciation (sometime before the early 16th century). The last element is sund which means "sound" or "strait". Historically, the name's spelling has varied. In the 1500s and 1600s it was spelled Jußund using the letter ß, and by the 1700s, it was written in its current form.

=== Churches ===
The Church of Norway had one parish (sokn) within Jøssund Municipality. At the time of the municipal dissolution, it was part of the Åfjord prestegjeld and the Fosen prosti (deanery) in the Diocese of Nidaros.

Churches in Jøssund Municipality
Parish (sokn)	Church name	Location of the church	Year built
Jøssund	Jøssund Church	Jøssund	1875

== Geography ==
Jøssund Municipality was a coastal municipality on the Fosen peninsula including an area on the mainland plus many offshore islands. Åfjord Municipality was located to the northeast, Stjørna Municipality was to the southeast, Bjugn Municipality was located to the south, and Nes Municipality was located to the southwest. The highest point in the municipality was the 492.5-metre (1,616 ft) tall mountain Seksortklumpen.

== Government ==
While it existed, Jøssund Municipality was responsible for primary education (through 10th grade), outpatient health services, senior citizen services, welfare and other social services, zoning, economic development, and municipal roads and utilities. The municipality was governed by a municipal council of directly elected representatives. The mayor was indirectly elected by a vote of the municipal council. The municipality was under the jurisdiction of the Frostating Court of Appeal.

=== Municipal council ===
The municipal council (Herredsstyre) of Jøssund Municipality was made up of 17 representatives that were elected to four year terms. The tables below show the historical composition of the council by political party.

Jøssund herredsstyre 1959–1963
Party name (in Norwegian)	Number of representatives
Labour Party (Arbeiderpartiet)	9
Christian Democratic Party (Kristelig Folkeparti)	2
Joint List(s) of Non-Socialist Parties (Borgerlige Felleslister)	6
Total number of members:	17
Note: On 1 January 1964, Jøssund Municipality became part of Bjugn Municipality.

Jøssund herredsstyre 1955–1959
Party name (in Norwegian)	Number of representatives
Labour Party (Arbeiderpartiet)	10
Christian Democratic Party (Kristelig Folkeparti)	2
Joint List(s) of Non-Socialist Parties (Borgerlige Felleslister)	5
Total number of members:	17

Jøssund herredsstyre 1951–1955
Party name (in Norwegian)	Number of representatives
Labour Party (Arbeiderpartiet)	9
Christian Democratic Party (Kristelig Folkeparti)	3
Local List(s) (Lokale lister)	4
Total number of members:	16

Jøssund herredsstyre 1947–1951
Party name (in Norwegian)	Number of representatives
Labour Party (Arbeiderpartiet)	9
Christian Democratic Party (Kristelig Folkeparti)	2
Joint List(s) of Non-Socialist Parties (Borgerlige Felleslister)	5
Total number of members:	16

Jøssund herredsstyre 1945–1947
Party name (in Norwegian)	Number of representatives
Labour Party (Arbeiderpartiet)	10
Joint List(s) of Non-Socialist Parties (Borgerlige Felleslister)	6
Total number of members:	16

Jøssund herredsstyre 1937–1941*
Party name (in Norwegian)	Number of representatives
Labour Party (Arbeiderpartiet)	6
Joint List(s) of Non-Socialist Parties (Borgerlige Felleslister)	10
Total number of members:	16
Note: Due to the German occupation of Norway during World War II, no elections were held for new municipal councils until after the war ended in 1945.

=== Mayors ===
The mayor (Norwegian: ordfører) of Jøssund Municipality was the political leader of the municipality and the chairperson of the municipal council. Here is a list of people who held this position:

- 1896–1902: Johan Normann (V)
- 1903–1919: Johannes Berg (H)
- 1920–1931: Albert Guldvik (V)
- 1932–1941: Bjarne Opland (V)
- 1942–1945: Eilert Herfjord, Jr. (NS)
- 1945–1945: Bjarne Opland (V)
- 1946–1953: Nils Lysø (Ap)
- 1954–1959: Jens Sundet (Ap)
- 1960–1963: Erling Hansen (Ap)

== See also ==
- List of former municipalities of Norway
