= Nes Municipality (Sør-Trøndelag) =

Former municipality in Sør-Trøndelag, Norway

Nes Municipality Nes herred
- Former municipality
- Sør-Trøndelag within Norway

- Nes within Sør-Trøndelag
- Coordinates: 63°46′17″N 09°35′08″E
- Country: Norway
- County: Sør-Trøndelag
- District: Fosen
- Established: 1 Jan 1899
  - Preceded by: Bjugn Municipality
- Disestablished: 1 Jan 1964
  - Succeeded by: Bjugn Municipality
- Administrative centre: Nes

Government
  - Mayor (1956–1963): Johan Berg (Bp)

Area (upon dissolution)
  - Total: 60.5 km^{2} (23.4 sq mi)
  - Rank: #577 in Norway
- Highest elevation: 484 m (1,588 ft)

Population (1963)
  - Total: 1,111
  - Rank: #597 in Norway
  - Density: 18.4/km^{2} (48/sq mi)
  - Change (10 years): ▼ −4.3%
- Demonym(s): Nessar; Nesser

Official language
  - Norwegian form: Bokmål
- Time zone: UTC+01:00 (CET)
  - Summer (DST): UTC+02:00 (CEST)
- ISO 3166 code: NO-1628

Nes is a former municipality in the old Sør-Trøndelag county, Norway. The municipality existed from 1899 until its dissolution in 1964. The 60.5-square-kilometre (23.4 sq mi) municipality encompassed the coastal land north of the Bjugnfjorden as well as the Tarva islands in what is now part of Ørland Municipality in Trøndelag county. The administrative centre of Nes was the village of Nes where the Nes Church is located.

Prior to its dissolution in 1964, the 60.5-square-kilometre (23.4 sq mi) municipality was the 577th largest by area out of the 689 municipalities in Norway. Nes Municipality was the 597th most populous municipality in Norway with a population of about 1,111. The municipality's population density was 18.4 inhabitants per square kilometre (48/sq mi) and its population had decreased by 4.3% over the previous 10-year period.

== General information ==
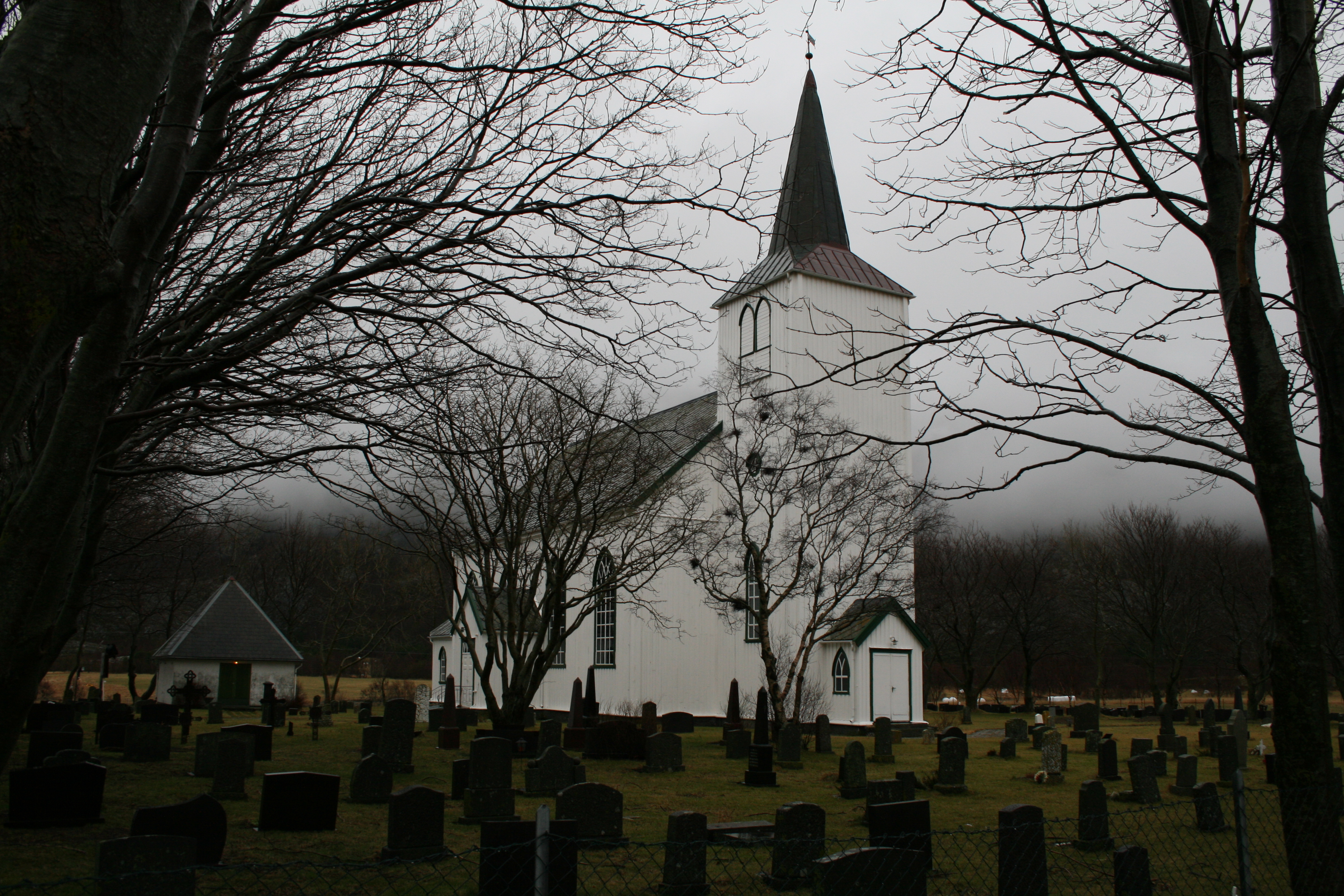
View of the Nes Church

The municipality of Nes was established on 1 January 1899 when the old Bjugn Municipality was split into three separate municipalities: Bjugn Municipality (population: 1,256), Skjørn Municipality (population: 2,166), and Nes Municipality (population: 1,285). During the 1960s, there were many municipal mergers across Norway due to the work of the Schei Committee.

On 1 January 1964, Nes Municipality (population: 1,107) was merged with the neighboring Bjugn Municipality (population: 1,240), Jøssund Municipality (population: 1,917), and the northern part of Stjørna Municipality (population: 676) to form a new, larger Bjugn Municipality.

=== Churches ===
The Church of Norway had one parish (sokn) within Nes Municipality. At the time of the municipal dissolution, it was part of the Bjugn prestegjeld and the Fosen prosti (deanery) in the Diocese of Nidaros.

Churches in Nes Municipality
Parish (sokn)	Church name	Location of the church	Year built
Nes	Nes Church	Nes	1878

== Geography ==
Nes Municipality was a coastal municipality on the Fosen peninsula including an area on the mainland plus many offshore islands including the Tarva islands. Jøssund Municipality was located to the northeast and Bjugn Municipality was to the southeast. Ørland Municipality was located to the south, across the Bjugnfjorden. The highest point in the municipality was the 484-metre (1,588 ft) tall mountain Kopparen.

== Government ==
While it existed, Nes Municipality was responsible for primary education (through 10th grade), outpatient health services, senior citizen services, welfare and other social services, zoning, economic development, and municipal roads and utilities. The municipality was governed by a municipal council of directly elected representatives. The mayor was indirectly elected by a vote of the municipal council. The municipality was under the jurisdiction of the Frostating Court of Appeal.

=== Municipal council ===
The municipal council (Herredsstyre) of Nes Municipality was made up of 13 representatives that were elected to four year terms. The tables below show the historical composition of the council by political party.

Nes herredsstyre 1959–1963
Party name (in Norwegian)	Number of representatives
Labour Party (Arbeiderpartiet)	5
Joint List(s) of Non-Socialist Parties (Borgerlige Felleslister)	4
Local List(s) (Lokale lister)	4
Total number of members:	13
Note: On 1 January 1964, Nes Municipality became part of Bjugn Municipality.

Nes herredsstyre 1955–1959
Party name (in Norwegian)	Number of representatives
Labour Party (Arbeiderpartiet)	6
Joint List(s) of Non-Socialist Parties (Borgerlige Felleslister)	3
Local List(s) (Lokale lister)	4
Total number of members:	13

Nes herredsstyre 1951–1955
Party name (in Norwegian)	Number of representatives
Labour Party (Arbeiderpartiet)	4
Joint List(s) of Non-Socialist Parties (Borgerlige Felleslister)	2
Local List(s) (Lokale lister)	6
Total number of members:	12

Nes herredsstyre 1947–1951
Party name (in Norwegian)	Number of representatives
Labour Party (Arbeiderpartiet)	4
Joint List(s) of Non-Socialist Parties (Borgerlige Felleslister)	5
Local List(s) (Lokale lister)	3
Total number of members:	12

Nes herredsstyre 1945–1947
Party name (in Norwegian)	Number of representatives
Labour Party (Arbeiderpartiet)	6
Joint List(s) of Non-Socialist Parties (Borgerlige Felleslister)	6
Total number of members:	12

Nes herredsstyre 1937–1941*
Party name (in Norwegian)	Number of representatives
Labour Party (Arbeiderpartiet)	6
Joint List(s) of Non-Socialist Parties (Borgerlige Felleslister)	6
Total number of members:	12
Note: Due to the German occupation of Norway during World War II, no elections were held for new municipal councils until after the war ended in 1945.

=== Mayors ===
The mayor (Norwegian: ordfører) of Nes Municipality was the political leader of the municipality and the chairperson of the municipal council. Here is a list of people who held this position:

- 1899–1910: Johan Andreas Johansen (SmP)
- 1911–1914: Nicolai Vahl
- 1914–1916: Gerhard Wik
- 1917–1934: Olav Wigdahl (V)
- 1935–1941: Hans Krokmyrdal (Ap)
- 1941–1945: Karl Hellem (NS)
- 1945–1945: Stener Robertsen (LL)
- 1945–1945: Asbjørn Berg (H)
- 1946–1947: Johan Berg (Bp)
- 1948–1955: Helmer Nygaard (Bp)
- 1956–1963: Johan Berg (Bp)

== See also ==
- List of former municipalities of Norway
