= Jøssund =

Jøssund may refer to:

== Places ==
- Jøssund, Flatanger, a village in Flatanger Municipality in Trøndelag county in Norway
- Jøssund, Ørland, a village in Ørland Municipality in Trøndelag county in Norway
- Jøssund Church, a church in Ørland Municipality in Trøndelag county in Norway
- Jøssund Municipality, a former municipality in the old Sør-Trøndelag county in Norway
