= Hegvik Church =

Church in Trøndelag, Norway

- Hegvik kirke
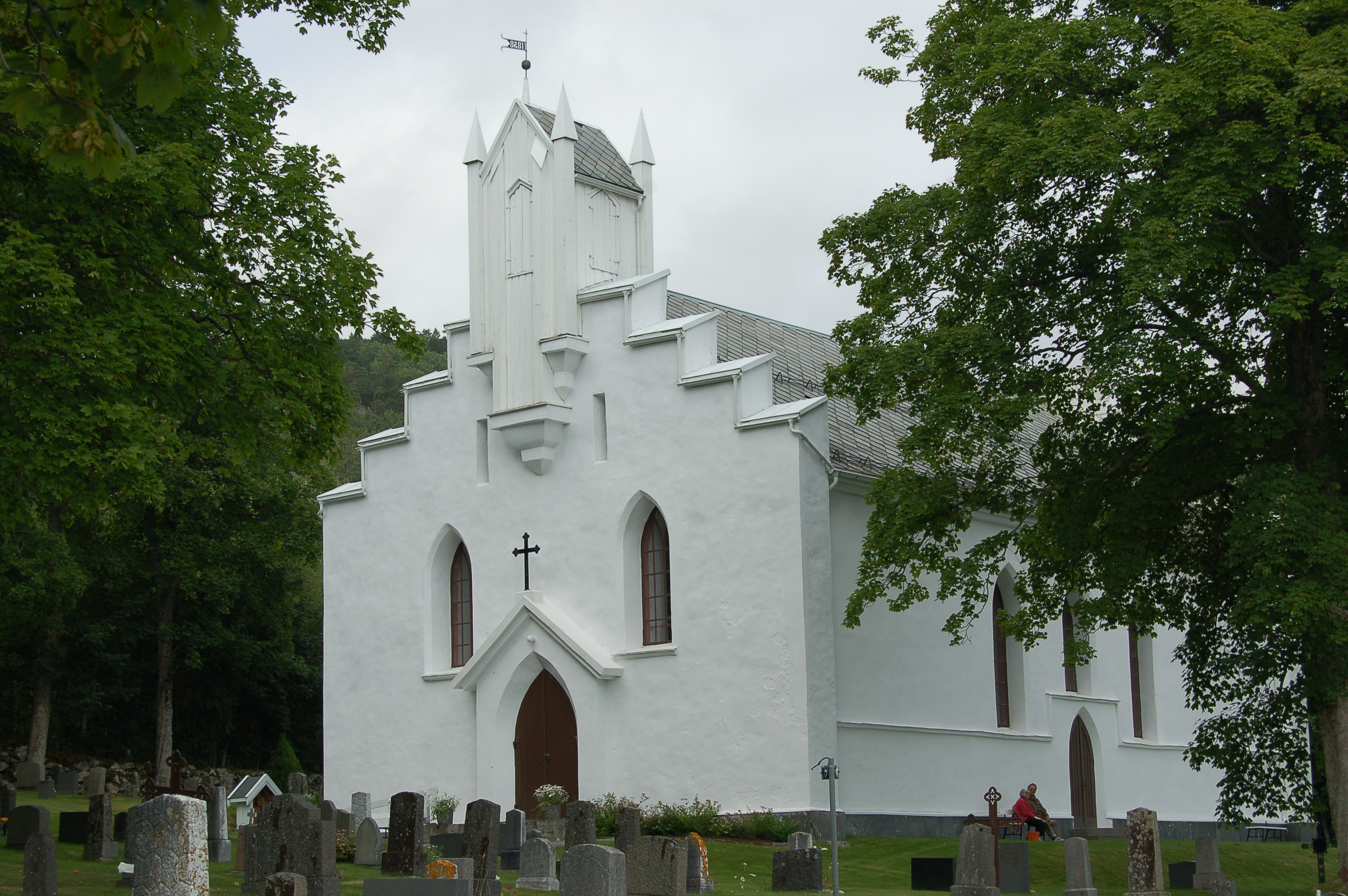
- View of the church
- Hegvik Church
- 63.73839827°N 09.87895399°E
- Location: Ørland Municipality, Trøndelag
- Country: Norway
- Denomination: Church of Norway
- Churchmanship: Evangelical Lutheran

History
- Former name: Stjørna kirke
- Status: Parish church
- Founded: 1858
- Consecrated: 1858

Architecture
- Functional status: Active
- Architect: Christian Heinrich Grosch
- Architectural type: Long church
- Completed: 1858 (168 years ago)

Specifications
- Capacity: 300
- Materials: Stone

Administration
- Diocese: Nidaros bispedømme
- Deanery: Fosen prosti
- Parish: Bjugn
- Norwegian Cultural Heritage Site
- Type: Church
- Status: Listed
- ID: 84523

Hegvik Church (Norwegian: Hegvik kirke; historically: Stjørna kirke) is a parish church of the Church of Norway in Ørland Municipality in Trøndelag county, Norway. It is located along the Stjørnfjorden in the village of Høybakken, about 5 kilometres (3.1 mi) south of the village of Bjugn. It is one of the churches for the Bjugn parish which is part of the Fosen prosti (deanery) in the Diocese of Nidaros. The white, stone church was built in a long church style in 1858 using plans drawn up by the architect Christian Heinrich Grosch (1801–1865). The church seats about 300 people.

== History ==
The parish of Bjugn was established by royal decree on 21 July 1852 with Bjugn Church as the main parish church and Nes Church and a new church in Stjørna as annexes to the main church. Permission to build a new church in Stjørna on the Hegvik farm (sometimes spelled Heggvik) was also granted at the same time. Hegvik Church is a long church built out of stone with exterior plaster covering the stone.

== See also ==
- List of churches in Nidaros
