= Tarva =

Tarva may refer to:

== Places ==
=== Estonia ===
- Tarva, Põhja-Pärnumaa Parish, a village in Põhja-Pärnumaa Parish in Pärnu County, Estonia
- Tarva, Lääneranna Parish, a village in Lääneranna Parish in Pärnu County, Estonia

=== Norway ===
- Tarva (Norway), an archipelago in Trøndelag county, Norway
- Tarva Chapel, a church in Trøndelag county, Norway

== Other ==
- Tarva, a fictional planet in The Chronicles of Narnia (the other is Alambil)

== See also ==
- Tarvas (disambiguation)
