= Johannes Berg =

Norwegian farmer, civil servant and politician

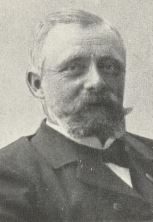
Johannes Berg

Johannes Berg (1 November 1863 – 21 November 1935) was a Norwegian farmer, civil servant and politician for the Conservative Party.

He was born in Trondhjem as a son of Valsøen in Jøssund as a son of farmer Petter Andreas Berg (1830–1907) and Henriette Margrete Brodtkorb (1838–1922). He was a relative of Christian Frederik Berg.

He finished middle school in Trondhjem in 1880 and then took a shipmate exam in 1884. He worked as a seaman and fisher before taking over the family farm Valsøen in 1898, which he sold in 1917. From 1907 he was also a postal clerk in Vallersund.

He was a member of Jøssund municipal council from 1898 to 1922, serving as mayor for eighteen years. He was elected to the Parliament of Norway from Sør-Trøndelag in 1924 and 1927, serving six years.
