= Bjugn affair =

Child molestation trial

The Bjugn affair in 1992 in Bjugn Municipality, Norway, started with the arrest of three women and four men and led to one, Ulf Hammern, being charged for allegedly having molested children. He was acquitted 31 January 1994 at Frostating Court of Appeal.
