= Tarvas =

Tarvas may refer to:

- BC Rakvere Tarvas, basketball club based in Rakvere
- Rakvere JK Tarvas, football club based in Rakvere

== People with the surname ==
- Karl Tarvas (1885–1975), Estonian architect
- Peeter Tarvas (1916–1987), Estonian architect and professor

== See also ==
- Tarva (disambiguation), name of several places, in Estonian the genitive of Tarvas
- Taurus (disambiguation)
