= Stjørna Municipality =

Former municipality in Sør-Trøndelag, Norway

Stjørna Municipality Stjørna herred
- Former municipality
- Skjørn herred (historic name)
- Sør-Trøndelag within Norway

- Stjørna within Sør-Trøndelag
- Coordinates: 63°44′50″N 10°06′25″E
- Country: Norway
- County: Sør-Trøndelag
- District: Fosen
- Established: 1 Jan 1899
  - Preceded by: Bjugn Municipality
- Disestablished: 1 Jan 1964
  - Succeeded by: Bjugn Municipality and Rissa Municipality
- Administrative centre: Husbysjøen

Government
  - Mayor (1956–1963): Georg Breivoll (V)

Area (upon dissolution)
  - Total: 322.2 km^{2} (124.4 sq mi)
  - Rank: #266 in Norway
- Highest elevation: 492.5 m (1,616 ft)

Population (1963)
  - Total: 2,572
  - Rank: #355 in Norway
  - Density: 8/km^{2} (21/sq mi)
  - Change (10 years): ▼ −7.8%
- Demonym: Stjørnværing

Official language
  - Norwegian form: Nynorsk
- Time zone: UTC+01:00 (CET)
  - Summer (DST): UTC+02:00 (CEST)
- ISO 3166 code: NO-1626

Stjørna is a former municipality in the old Sør-Trøndelag county in Norway. The municipality existed from 1899 until its dissolution in 1964. The 322.2-square-kilometre (124.4 sq mi) municipality encompassed the land surrounding the Stjørnfjorden in what is now Ørland Municipality and Indre Fosen Municipality in Trøndelag county. The administrative centre of Stjørna was the village of Husbysjøen. The municipality of Stjørna also included the villages of Høybakken, Råkvåg, and Fevåg. The main church for the municipality was Stjørna Church which is now called Heggvik Church.

Prior to its dissolution in 1964, the 322.2-square-kilometre (124.4 sq mi) municipality was the 266th largest by area out of the 689 municipalities in Norway. Stjørna Municipality was the 355th most populous municipality in Norway with a population of about 2,572. The municipality's population density was 8 inhabitants per square kilometre (21/sq mi) and its population had decreased by 7.8% over the previous 10-year period.

== General information ==
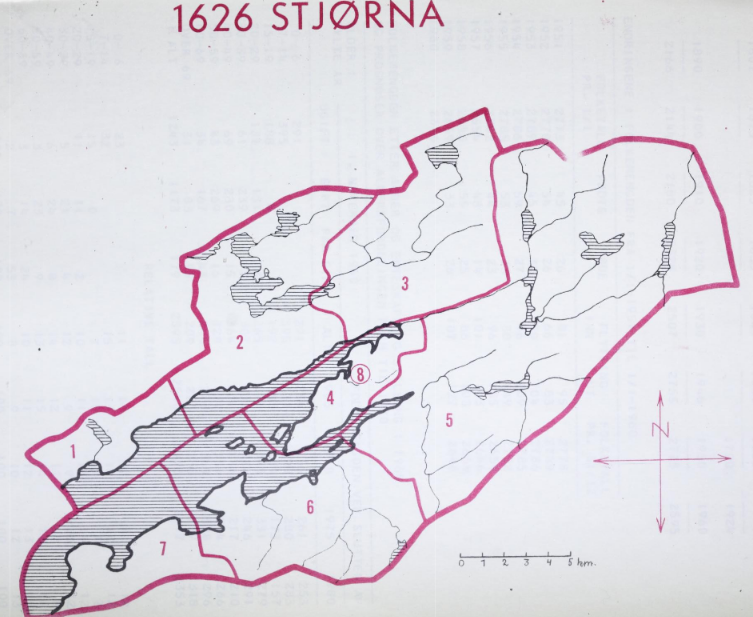
Map of the municipality in 1960

The municipality of Skjørn was established on 1 January 1899 when Bjugn Municipality was divided into three separate municipalities: Bjugn Municipality (population: 1,256), Skjørn Municipality (population: 2,166), and Nes Municipality (population: 1,285). In 1918, the spelling of the name was changed from Skjørn Municipality to Stjørna Municipality. During the 1960s, there were many municipal mergers across Norway due to the work of the Schei Committee. On 1 January 1964, Stjørna Municipality was dissolved and its lands were divided as follows:

- the northern part of the municipality (Nord-Stjørna) (population: 676) was merged with the neighboring Bjugn Municipality (population: 1,240), Nes Municipality (population: 1,107), and Jøssund Municipality (population: 1,917) to form a new, larger Bjugn Municipality.
- the southern part of the municipality (Sør-Stjørna) (population: 1,868) was merged with the neighboring Rissa Municipality (population: 3,264) and most of Stadsbygd Municipality (population: 1,616) to form a new, larger Rissa Municipality.

=== Name ===
The municipality (originally the parish) is named after the local Stjørnfjorden. The name was once the old name for the river which flows into the fjord. The old river name has an uncertain meaning. It may come from the Old Norse word stjórn which means "governance". Historically, the name of the municipality was spelled Skjørn. On 3 November 1917, a royal resolution changed the spelling of the name of the municipality to Stjørna.

=== Churches ===
The Church of Norway had one parish (sokn) within Stjørna Municipality. At the time of the municipal dissolution, it was part of the Bjugn prestegjeld and the Fosen prosti (deanery) in the Diocese of Nidaros.

Churches in Stjørna Municipality
Parish (sokn)	Church name	Location of the church	Year built
Stjørna	Stjørna Church	Høybakken	1858
Stjørna	Ramsvik Church	Råkvåg	1909

== Geography ==
Stjørna Municipality included the land surrounding the Stjørnfjorden on the Fosen peninsula. Ørland Municipality and Bjugn Municipality were located to the west, Jøssund Municipality was to the northwest, Åfjord Municipality was located to the north, and Rissa Municipality was located to the southeast. The highest point in the municipality was the 492.5-metre (1,616 ft) tall mountain Seksortklumpen.

== Government ==
While it existed, Stjørna Municipality was responsible for primary education (through 10th grade), outpatient health services, senior citizen services, welfare and other social services, zoning, economic development, and municipal roads and utilities. The municipality was governed by a municipal council of directly elected representatives. The mayor was indirectly elected by a vote of the municipal council. The municipality was under the jurisdiction of the Frostating Court of Appeal.

=== Municipal council ===
The municipal council (Herredsstyre) of Stjørna Municipality was made up of 17 representatives that were elected to four year terms. The tables below show the historical composition of the council by political party.

Stjørna heradsstyre 1959–1963
Party name (in Nynorsk)	Number of representatives
Labour Party (Arbeidarpartiet)	7
Conservative Party (Høgre)	1
Christian Democratic Party (Kristeleg Folkeparti)	2
Centre Party (Senterpartiet)	1
Liberal Party (Venstre)	3
Local List(s) (Lokale lister)	3
Total number of members:	17
Note: On 1 January 1964, Stjørna Municipality became part of Bjugn Municipality and Rissa Municipality.

Stjørna heradsstyre 1955–1959
Party name (in Nynorsk)	Number of representatives
Labour Party (Arbeidarpartiet)	6
Conservative Party (Høgre)	1
Christian Democratic Party (Kristeleg Folkeparti)	2
Liberal Party (Venstre)	3
Local List(s) (Lokale lister)	5
Total number of members:	17

Stjørna heradsstyre 1951–1955
Party name (in Nynorsk)	Number of representatives
Labour Party (Arbeidarpartiet)	6
Christian Democratic Party (Kristeleg Folkeparti)	2
Liberal Party (Venstre)	4
Local List(s) (Lokale lister)	4
Total number of members:	16

Stjørna heradsstyre 1947–1951
Party name (in Nynorsk)	Number of representatives
Labour Party (Arbeidarpartiet)	4
Communist Party (Kommunistiske Parti)	1
Christian Democratic Party (Kristeleg Folkeparti)	2
Liberal Party (Venstre)	5
Local List(s) (Lokale lister)	4
Total number of members:	16

Stjørna heradsstyre 1945–1947
Party name (in Nynorsk)	Number of representatives
Labour Party (Arbeidarpartiet)	7
Christian Democratic Party (Kristeleg Folkeparti)	2
Liberal Party (Venstre)	3
Local List(s) (Lokale lister)	4
Total number of members:	16

Stjørna heradsstyre 1937–1941*
Party name (in Nynorsk)	Number of representatives
Labour Party (Arbeidarpartiet)	7
Liberal Party (Venstre)	5
Joint List(s) of Non-Socialist Parties (Borgarlege Felleslister)	2
Local List(s) (Lokale lister)	2
Total number of members:	16
Note: Due to the German occupation of Norway during World War II, no elections were held for new municipal councils until after the war ended in 1945.

=== Mayors ===
The mayor (Nynorsk: ordførar) of Stjørna Municipality was the political leader of the municipality and the chairperson of the municipal council. Here is a list of people who held this position:

- 1899–1904: Johan Arnt Hegvik (V)
- 1905–1910: Johan Arnt Mollan (V)
- 1911–1916: Lars Bromstad (V)
- 1917–1925: Johan Arnt Mollan (V)
- 1926–1936: Kristian Ramsvik (V)
- 1938–1940: Hans Bromstad (V)
- 1941–1944: Christian Brun Jenssen (NS)
- 1944–1945: Johan Olav Bjørkvik (NS)
- 1945–1945: Karl Saltnes (Bp)
- 1945–1955: Hans Bromstad (V)
- 1956–1963: Georg Breivoll (V)

== See also ==
- List of former municipalities of Norway
