= Nes Church, Ørland =

Church in Trøndelag, Norway

Nes Church
- Nes kirke
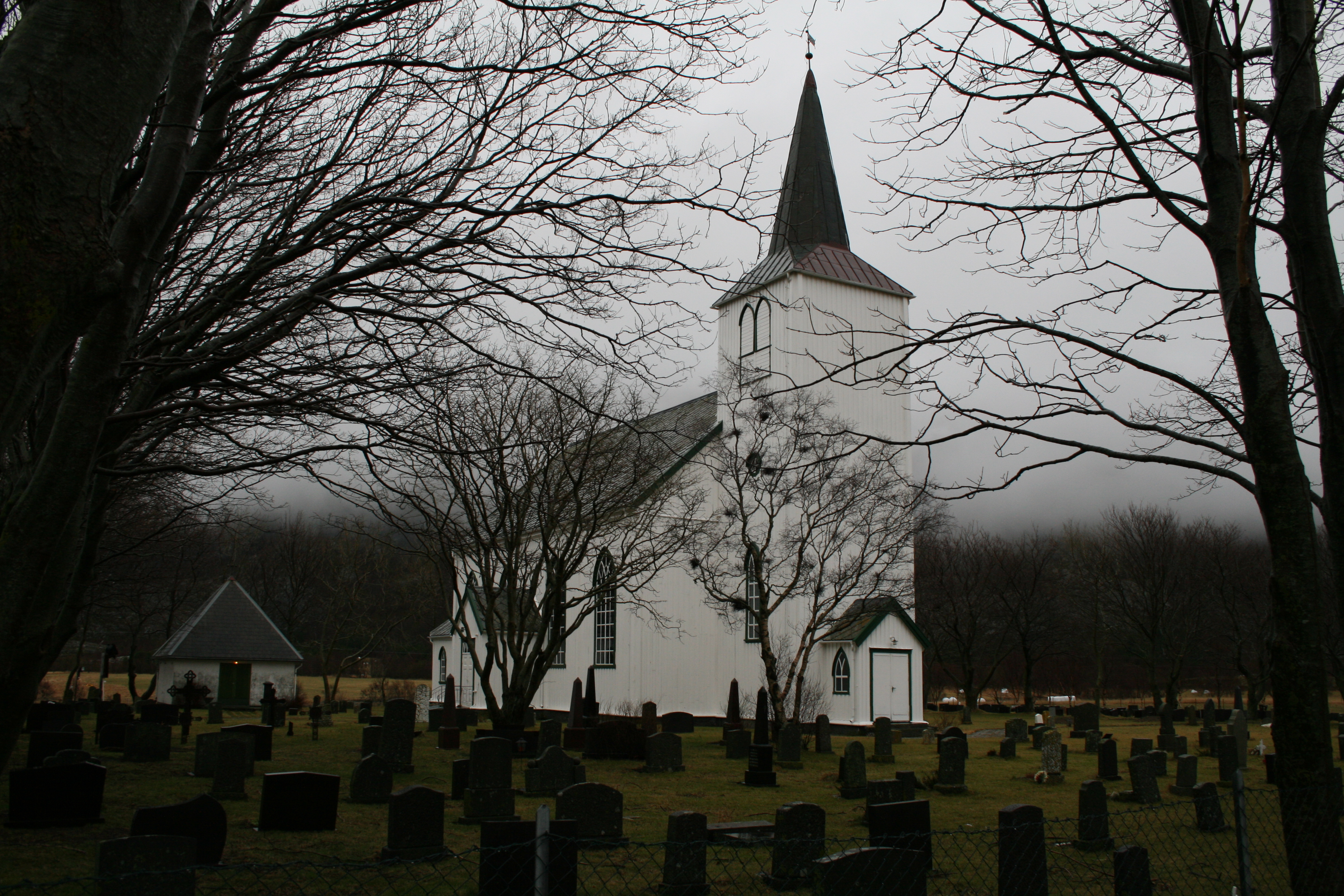
- View of the church
- Nes Church
- 63.78485238°N 09.60401120°E
- Location: Ørland Municipality, Trøndelag
- Country: Norway
- Denomination: Church of Norway
- Churchmanship: Evangelical Lutheran

History
- Status: Parish church
- Founded: 14th century
- Consecrated: 18 April 1879

Architecture
- Functional status: Active
- Architect: Otinius Forbrægd
- Architectural type: Long church
- Completed: 1878 (148 years ago)

Specifications
- Capacity: 350
- Materials: Wood

Administration
- Diocese: Nidaros bispedømme
- Deanery: Fosen prosti
- Parish: Nes
- Norwegian Cultural Heritage Site
- Type: Church
- Status: Not protected
- ID: 85118

Nes Church (Norwegian: Nes kirke) is a parish church of the Church of Norway in Ørland Municipality in Trøndelag county, Norway. It is located in the village of Nes, about 7 kilometres (4.3 mi) southwest of the village of Oksvoll and 11 kilometres (6.8 mi) west of the village of Bjugn. It is the main church for the Nes parish which is part of the Fosen prosti (deanery) in the Diocese of Nidaros. The white, wooden church was built in a long church style in 1878 using plans drawn up by the architect Otinius Forbrægd. The church seats about 350 people.

== History ==
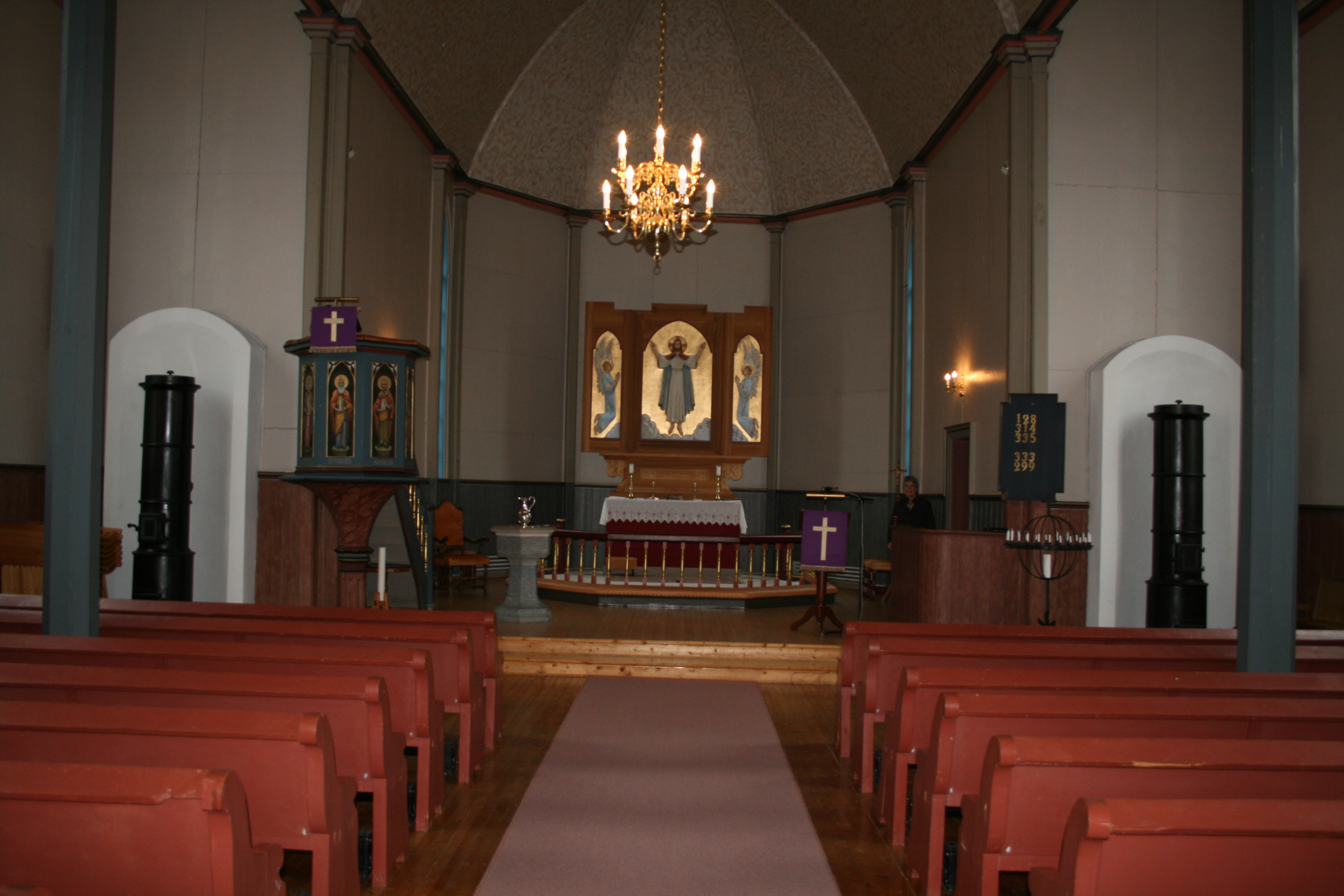
View of the interior

The earliest existing historical records of the church date back to the year 1520, but the church was not new that year. The original stave church at Nes was dedicated to Saint Andrew and it was located about 2 kilometres (1.2 mi) southwest of the present-day church site. The church may have been first built during the 14th century. In 1625 and again 1633, the desire to build a new church was expressed by the congregation, but each time it was denied. During the 1670s, the old building taken down and moved about 100 metres (330 ft) to the west-southwest to a better location. There, it was rebuilt (and extensively repaired, presumably with a lot of replacement of materials). In 1688, the church got a new roof and a new bell tower. Again, during the 1720s, the church was extensively repaired after being purchased by a private owner (the King of Denmark-Norway sold many churches in 1723 to help pay for the Great Northern War during the Norwegian church auction). In 1770, after being struck by lightning, the church burned to the ground. After removing the remains of the old church, a new church was built on the same location in 1774.

In 1825, the church was purchased out of private ownership by the local parish congregation. In the 1870s, there was a demand for a new church, and the cemetery that was in use at that time had no possibilities for expansion. So, in 1878, a new church was built on Hellem, about 2 kilometres (1.2 mi) northeast of the old church site. The new church was put into use in November 1878, but it was not formally consecrated until 18 April 1879 by Bishop Andreas Grimelund. After the new church was put into use, the old church was sold and taken down. The materials were then shipped to Fyrde where it was rebuilt as the new Austefjord Church in 1879. In 1958, Nes Church was renovated using plans by John Egil Tverdahl.

== See also ==
- List of churches in Nidaros
