= Høybakken =

Village in Ørland Municipality, Norway

- Village
- Interactive map of Høybakken
- Location within Trøndelag Location within Norway
- Coordinates: 63.7345°N 09.8737°E
- Country: Norway
- Region: Central Norway
- County: Trøndelag
- District: Fosen
- Municipality: Ørland Municipality
- Elevation: 3 m (9.8 ft)
- Time zone: UTC+01:00 (CET)
  - Summer (DST): UTC+02:00 (CEST)
- Post Code: 7160 Bjugn

Høybakken is a village in Ørland Municipality in Trøndelag county, Norway. It is located along the Stjørnfjorden, about 5 kilometres (3.1 mi) south of the municipal center of Bjugn. The area was once part of Stjørna Municipality. The village is home to the Hegvik Church.
