= Jøssund Church =

Church in Trøndelag, Norway

- Jøssund kirke
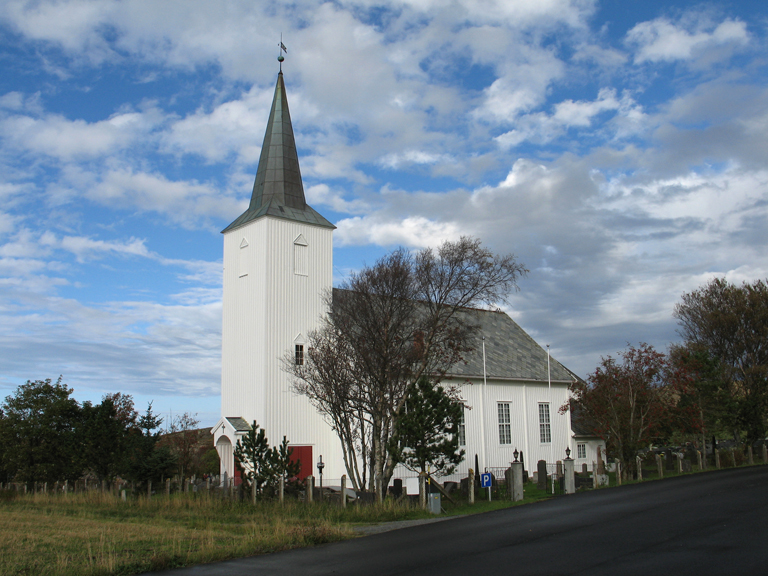
- View of the church
- Jøssund Church
- 63.86149051°N 09.80957061°E
- Location: Ørland Municipality, Trøndelag
- Country: Norway
- Denomination: Church of Norway
- Churchmanship: Evangelical Lutheran

History
- Status: Parish church
- Founded: 15th century
- Consecrated: 27 April 1876

Architecture
- Functional status: Active
- Architect: Otinius Forbrægd
- Architectural type: Long church
- Completed: 1875 (151 years ago)

Specifications
- Capacity: 350
- Length: 26 metres (85 ft)
- Width: 13 metres (43 ft)
- Materials: Wood

Administration
- Diocese: Nidaros bispedømme
- Deanery: Fosen prosti
- Parish: Jøssund
- Norwegian Cultural Heritage Site
- Type: Church
- Status: Not protected
- ID: 84754

Jøssund Church (Norwegian: Jøssund kirke) is a parish church of the Church of Norway in Ørland Municipality in Trøndelag county, Norway. It is located in the village of Jøssund, which is located on the coast about halfway between the coastal villages of Vallersund and Lysøysundet. It is the church for the Jøssund parish, which is part of the Fosen prosti (deanery) in the Diocese of Nidaros. The white, wooden church was built in a long church style in 1875, using plans by the architect Otinius Forbrægd. The church seats about 350 people.

== History ==
The earliest existing historical records of the church date back to the year 1589, but the church was likely built during the 15th century. The first church was built at Jøssund, about 2.25 kilometres (1.40 mi) southwest of the present church site. Around the year 1660, some new windows were installed in the church. During the 1770s, major repairs to the old church were made. In the 19th century the church was considered too small for the number of people attending it. The debate, however, was not about whether to build a larger church, but rather where to build it. After a long dispute over its location, the church site was moved to Mandal, about 2.25 kilometres (1.40 mi) to the northeast of the old church site. The new church was built there in 1875 and it was consecrated on 27 April 1876 by Bishop Andreas Grimelund. The building is 26 by 13 metres (85 ft × 43 ft), with seating for about 350 people. The old church was torn down after the new church was put into use. Nes Church was remodeled in 1950 by the architect John Egil Tverdahl and was re-consecrated on 29 May 1953 by Bishop Arne Fjellbu.

== Media gallery ==
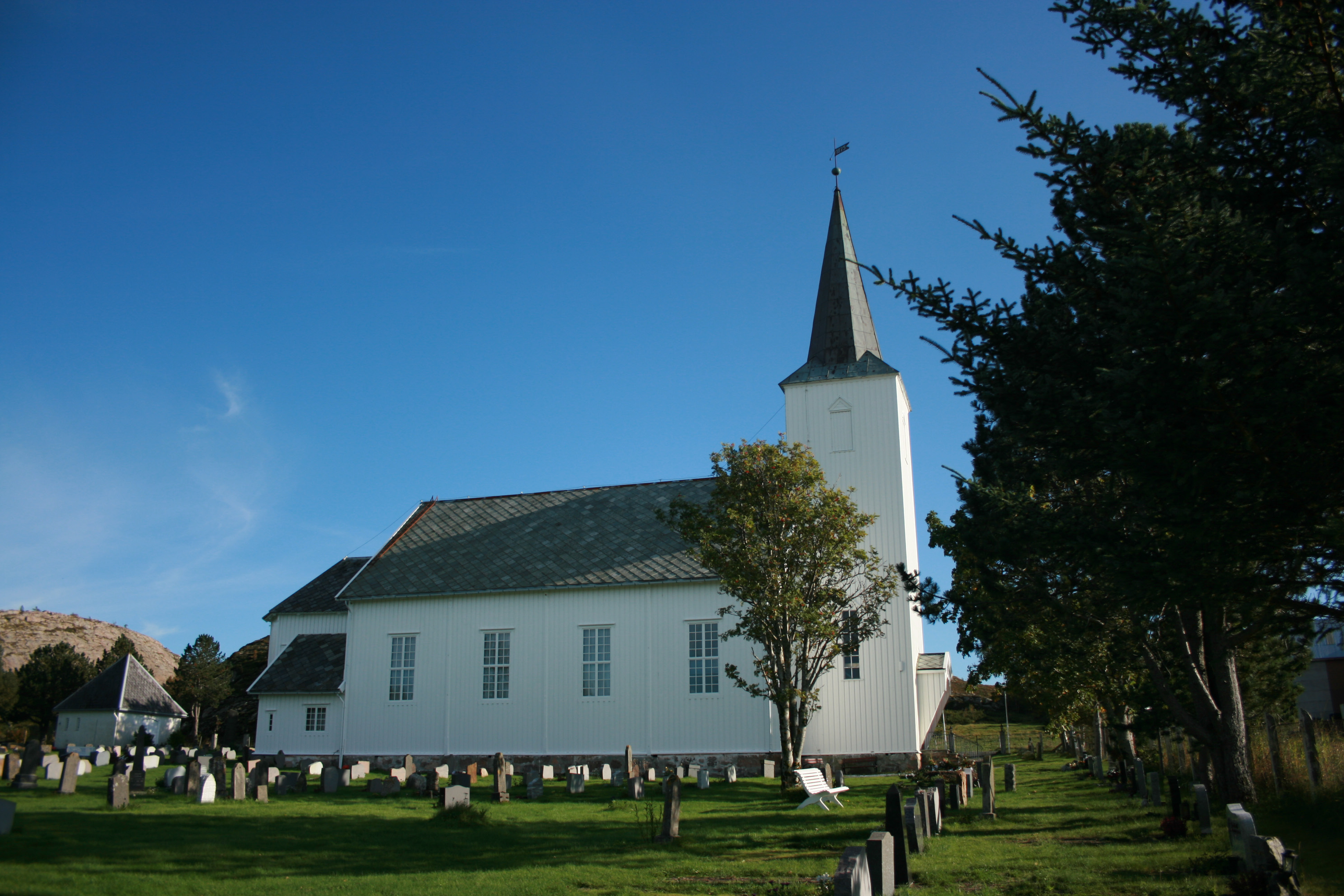

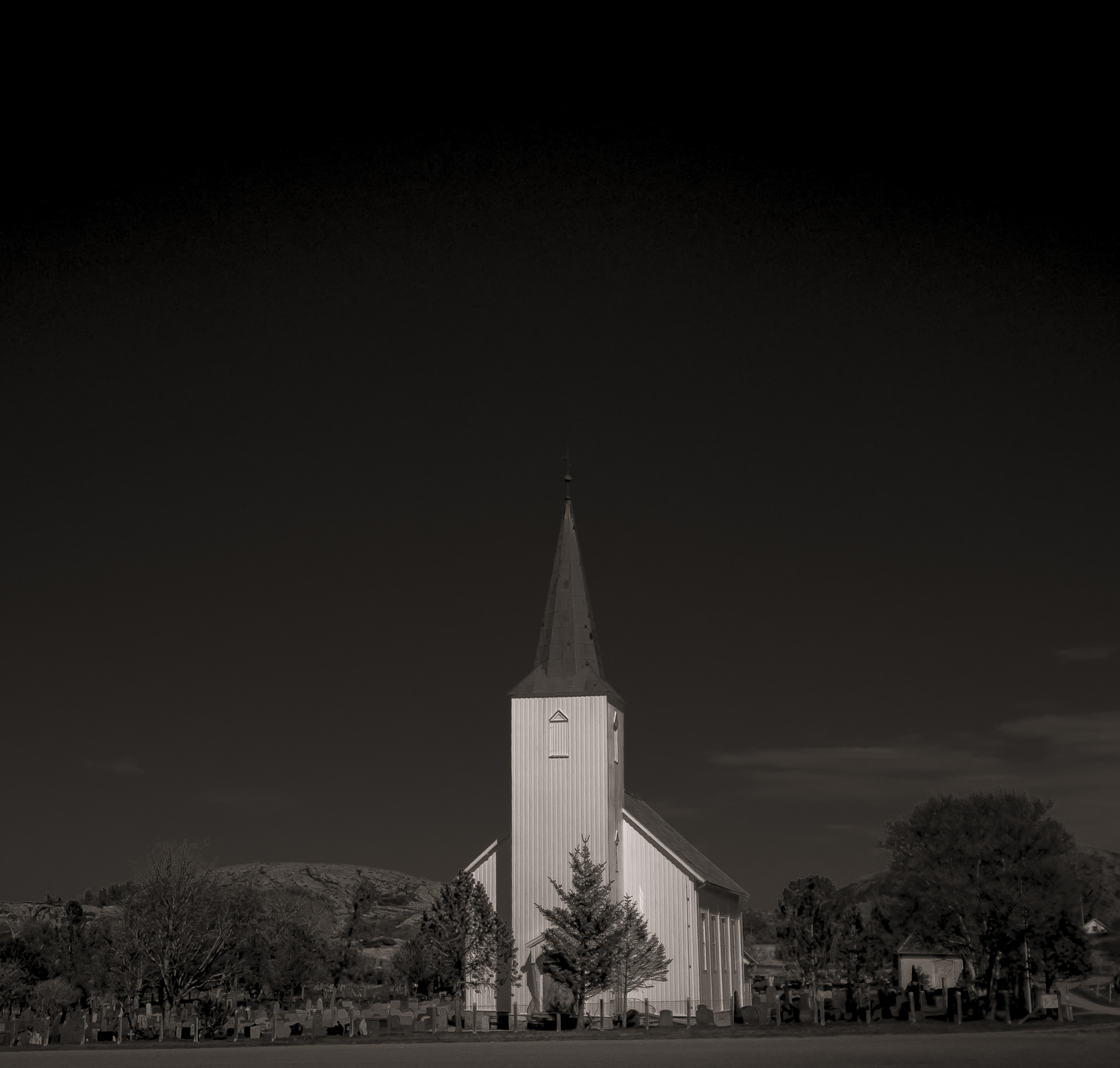

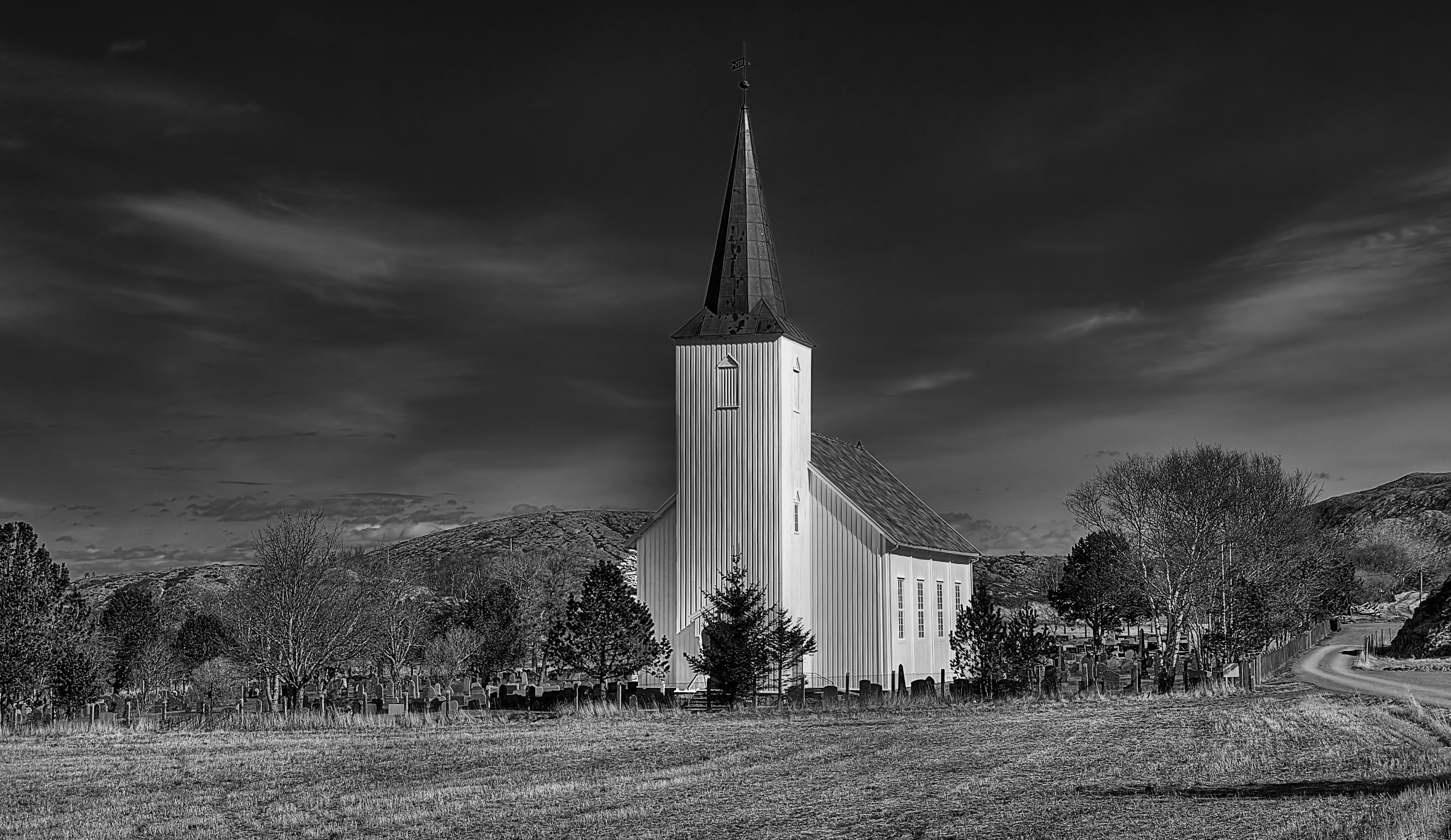

== See also ==
- List of churches in Nidaros
