= Stjørnfjord =

Fjord in Trøndelag, Norway

Stjørnfjorden
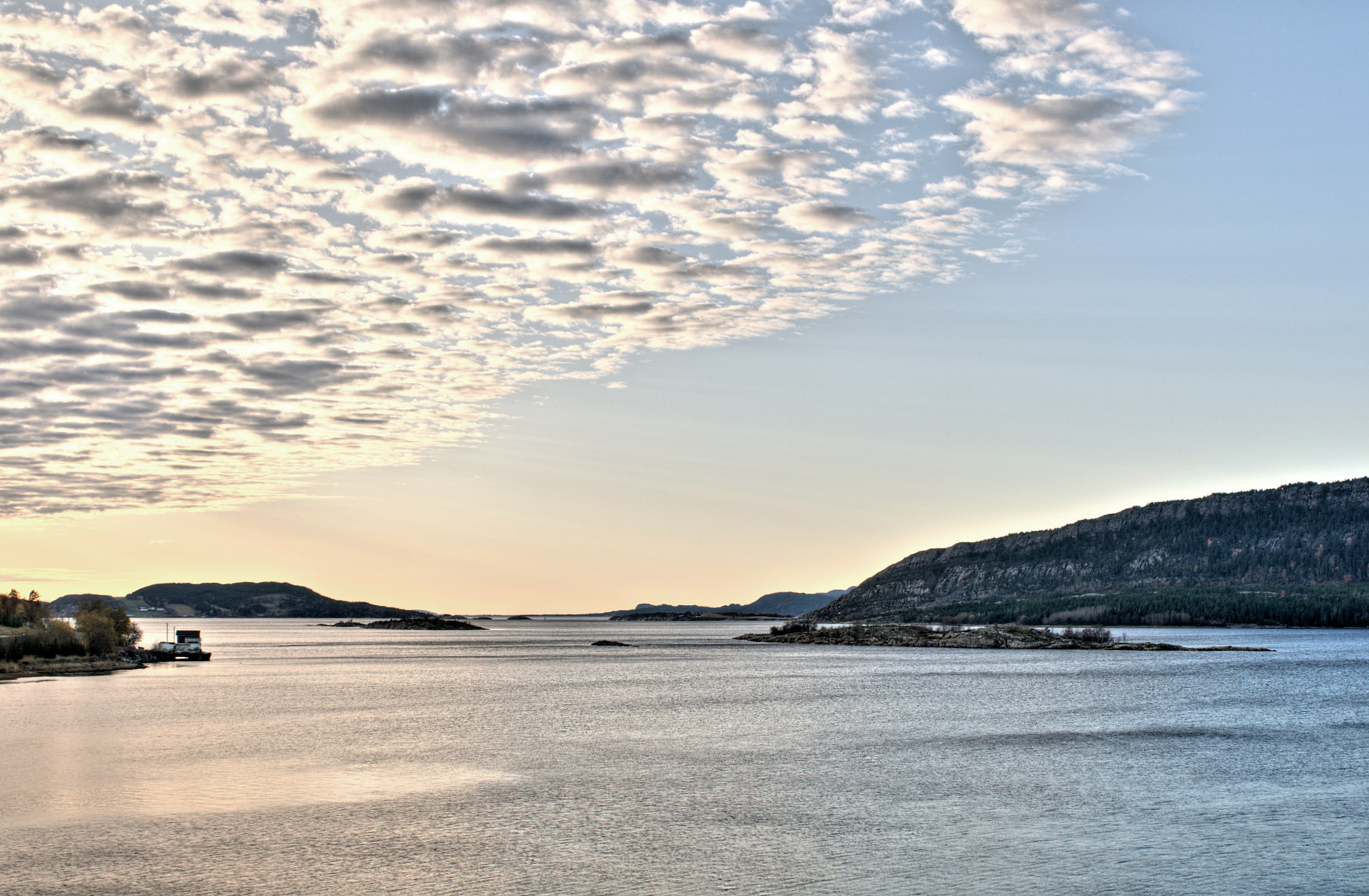
- View of the inner part of the fjord
- Interactive map of the fjord
- Location: Trøndelag county, Norway
- Coordinates: 63.7101°N 09.8638°E
- Type: Fjord
- Primary inflows: Nordelva river
- Primary outflows: Trondheimsfjorden
- Basin countries: Norway
- Max. length: 20 kilometres (12 mi)
- Max. width: 6 kilometres (3.7 mi)
- Settlements: Råkvåg

Stjørnfjorden is an arm of Trondheimsfjorden that flows along the border of Ørland Municipality and Indre Fosen Municipality in Trøndelag county, Norway. The 20-kilometre (12 mi) long fjord stretches southwest from the mouth of the Nordelva river near the village of Råkvåg to the Trondheimsfjord near Brekstad and Austrått. The inner part of the fjord splits into two smaller arms, the Nordfjord and Sørfjord. The Bjugnfjorden lies about 6 kilometres (3.7 mi) north of the fjord.

The village of Austrått, which includes the Austrått manor, is located on the northern shore near the outlet of the Stjørnfjorden into the Trondheimsfjord. The village of Høybakken and Heggvik Church lie on the north side of the fjord. On the south side is Fevåg on the far side of Bakstein point. Skerries stick up where the fjord parts into two arms. The village of Råkvåg is located on the south side of the Nordfjord, while the village of Mælan is located at the terminus of the Sørfjord. Historically, the area surrounding the fjord was part of Stjørna Municipality from 1899-1964 when the municipality was dissolved.

Norwegian County Road 718 goes along the south shore of the fjord, while Norwegian County Road 231 goes along a portion of the north shore.
