= Fosenhallen =

Multi-use ice rink in Bjugn, Ørland, Norway

Coordinates: 63°45′49″N 9°48′51″E

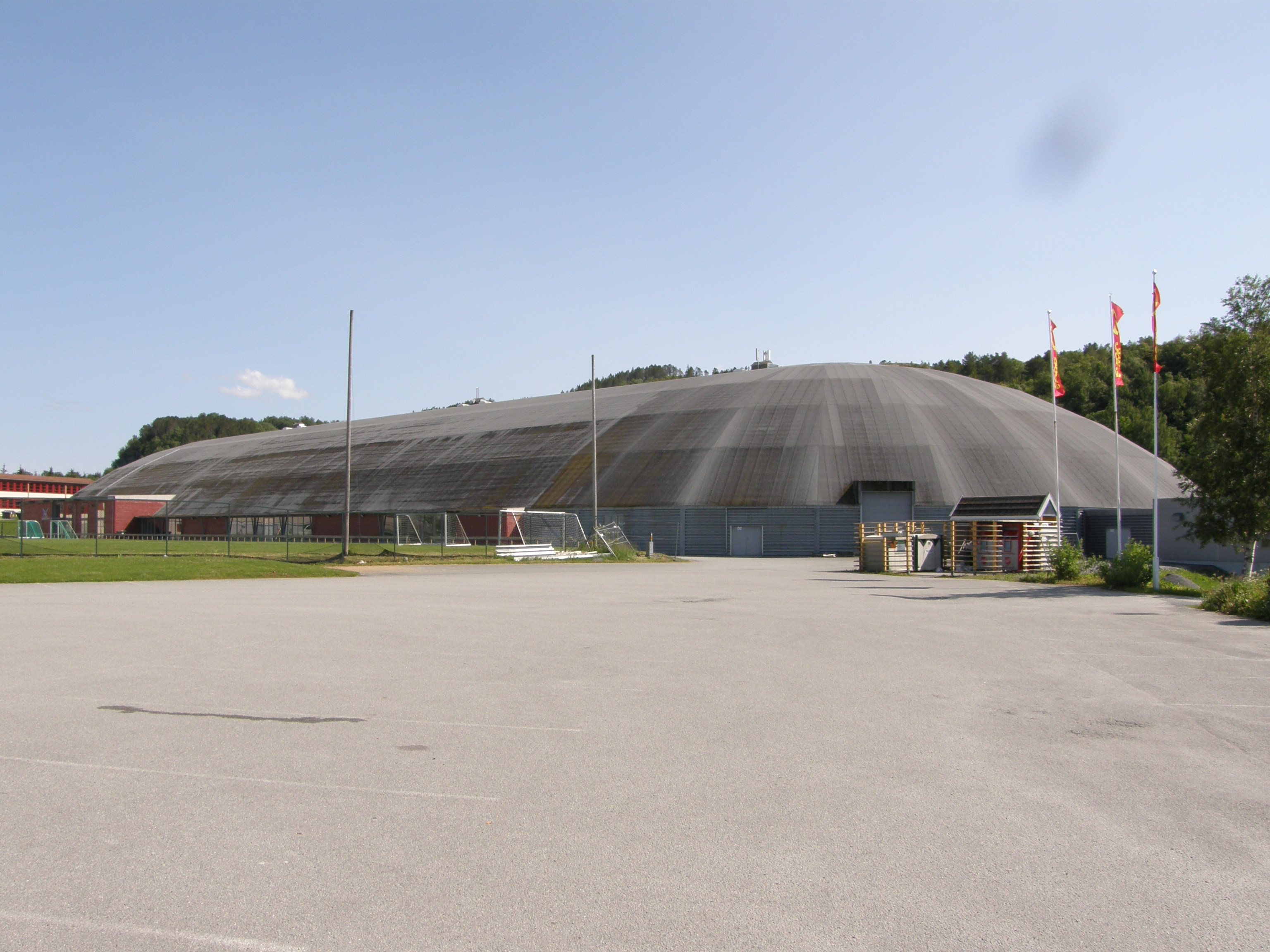
Fosenhallen

Fosenhallen is an indoor multi-use ice rink in the village of Bjugn in Ørland Municipality in Trøndelag county, Norway. It consists of a speed skating rink, with an ice hockey rink and a football field in the middle, as well as a curling rink. It opened on 14 September 2007.
