= Oksvoll =

Village in Ørland Municipality, Norway

- Village
- Interactive map of Oksvoll
- Location within Trøndelag Location within Norway
- Coordinates: 63.8145°N 09.6799°E
- Country: Norway
- Region: Central Norway
- County: Trøndelag
- District: Fosen
- Municipality: Ørland Municipality
- Elevation: 16 m (52 ft)
- Time zone: UTC+01:00 (CET)
  - Summer (DST): UTC+02:00 (CEST)
- Post Code: 7165 Oksvoll

Oksvoll is a village in Ørland Municipality in Trøndelag county, Norway. The village is located about 10 kilometres (6.2 mi) northwest of the municipal center of Bjugn, about 7 kilometres (4.3 mi) southwest of the village of Vallersund, and about 8 kilometres (5.0 mi) northeast of the village of Nes.
