= Bjugnfjorden =

Fjord in Trøndelag, Norway

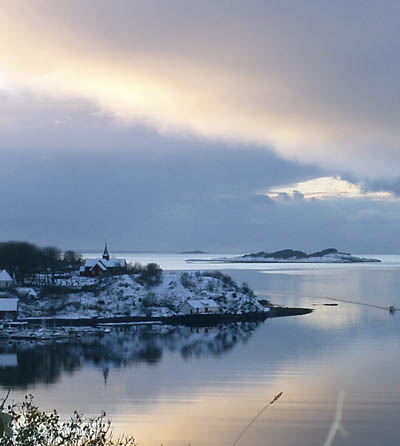
- View of the fjord with Bjugn Church on the shore
- Interactive map of the fjord
- Location: Trøndelag county, Norway
- Coordinates: 63.74335°N 09.57861°E
- Type: Fjord
- Primary outflows: Frohavet
- Basin countries: Norway
- Max. length: 14 kilometres (8.7 mi)
- Max. width: 5.5 kilometres (3.4 mi)
- Settlements: Botngård

Bjugnfjorden is a fjord in Ørland Municipality in Trøndelag county, Norway. The 14-kilometre (8.7 mi) long fjord begins at the village of Bjugn and it heads to the west past the Kjeungskjær Lighthouse into the Atlantic Ocean. Other villages along the fjord include Nes and Uthaug. Bjugn Church is located on the southern shore of the fjord. The Stjørnfjorden lies about 6 kilometres (3.7 mi) south of it, on the other side of the Ørlandet peninsula.

== See also ==
- List of Norwegian fjords
