= Asenvågøy Lighthouse =

Coastal lighthouse in Norway

Asenvågøy Lighthouse Asenvågøy fyrstasjon
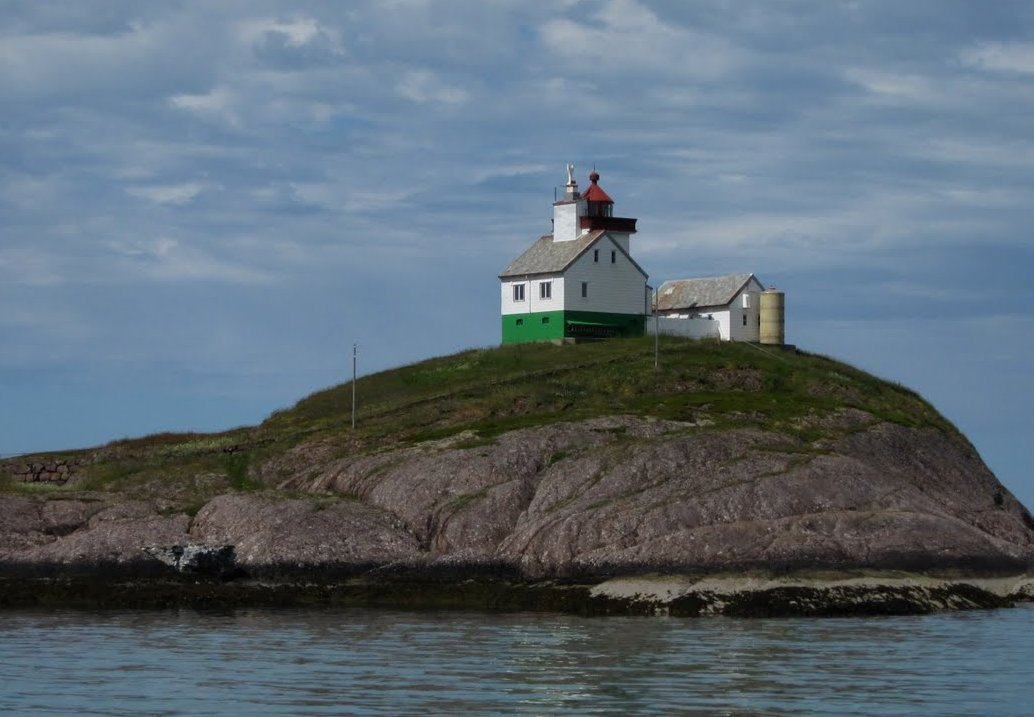
- View of the lighthouse
- Location: Trøndelag, Norway
- Coordinates: 63.9420°N 09.7712°E

Tower
- Constructed: 1921
- Construction: Wood
- Automated: 1975
- Height: 14 metres (46 ft)
- Shape: Square tower
- Markings: White with red top
- Operator: Stiftelsen Frohavet Lysøysund Kystkultursenter

Light
- Focal height: 30 metres (98 ft)
- Intensity: 33,300 candela
- Range: Red: 10.2 nmi (18.9 km; 11.7 mi) Green: 9.7 nmi (18.0 km; 11.2 mi) White: 12.8 nmi (23.7 km; 14.7 mi)
- Characteristic: Oc WRG 6s
- Norway no.: 478600

Asenvågøy Lighthouse or Asenvågsøya Lighthouse (Norwegian: Asenvågøy fyrstasjon) is a coastal lighthouse in Ørland Municipality in Trøndelag county, Norway. The lighthouse is located at the entrance to the Lauvøyfjorden about 8 kilometres (5.0 mi) northwest of the village of Lysøysundet and about 7 kilometres (4.3 mi) west of the island of Lauvøya. It was built in 1921, and it was automated in 1975.

The 14-metre-tall (46 ft) square tower is made out of wood, and it is attached to a 1 1/2-story lighthouse keeper's house. The white tower has a red top with a light that sits at an elevation of 30 metres (98 ft) above sea level. The light flashes in white, red, and green (depending on direction) and it is occulting once every six seconds. The 33,300-candela light can be seen for up to 12.8 nautical miles (23.7 km; 14.7 mi). The site is only accessible by boat. The site is open, but the tower is closed to the public.

== See also ==
- Lighthouses in Norway
- List of lighthouses in Norway
