= Vallersund =

Village in Ørland Municipality, Norway

- Village
- Interactive map of Vallersund
- Location within Trøndelag Location within Norway
- Coordinates: 63.8620°N 09.7487°E
- Country: Norway
- Region: Central Norway
- County: Trøndelag
- District: Fosen
- Municipality: Ørland Municipality
- Elevation: 11 m (36 ft)
- Time zone: UTC+01:00 (CET)
  - Summer (DST): UTC+02:00 (CEST)
- Post Code: 7167 Vallersund

Vallersund is a village in Ørland Municipality in Trøndelag county, Norway. The village is located about 5 kilometres (3.1 mi) northwest of the village of Jøssund and about 7 kilometres (4.3 mi) northeast of the village of Oksvoll. The Asenvågøy Lighthouse is located on an island that is about 10 kilometres (6.2 mi) north of the village.

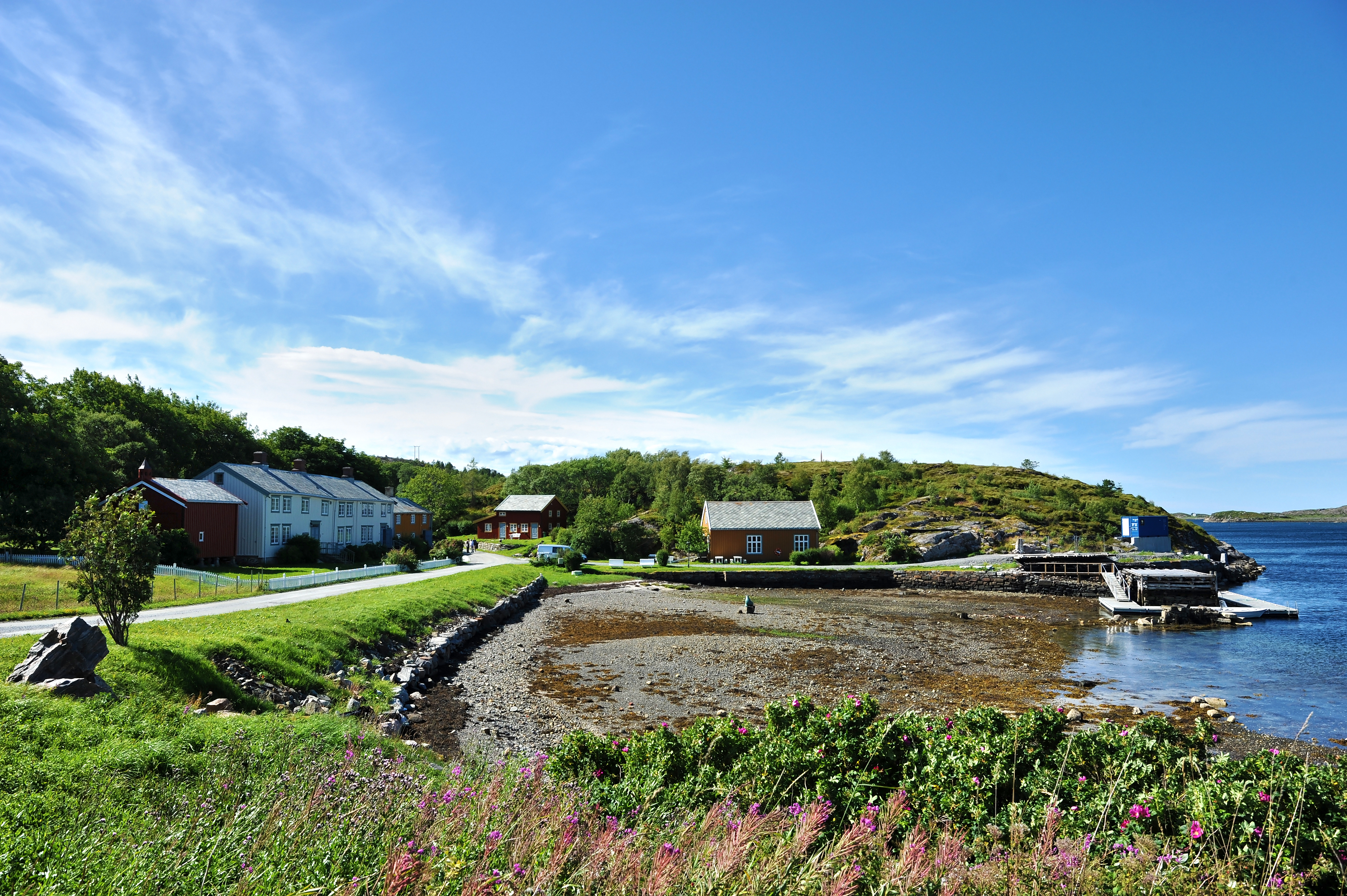
The Camphill village of Vallersund Gård
