= Tarva Chapel =

Church in Trøndelag, Norway

- Tarva kapell
- Tarva Chapel
- 63.81844399°N 9.43048864°E
- Location: Ørland Municipality, Trøndelag
- Country: Norway
- Denomination: Church of Norway
- Churchmanship: Evangelical Lutheran

History
- Status: Chapel
- Founded: 1972
- Consecrated: 8 Oct 1972

Architecture
- Functional status: Active
- Architectural type: Long church
- Completed: 1972 (54 years ago)

Specifications
- Capacity: 55
- Materials: Wood

Administration
- Diocese: Nidaros bispedømme
- Deanery: Fosen prosti
- Parish: Nes

Tarva Chapel (Norwegian: Tarva kapell) is a chapel in Ørland Municipality in Trøndelag county, Norway. It is located at Nordbuen on the island of Husøya, the largest of the Tarva. It is an annex chapel in the Nes parish which is part of the Fosen prosti (deanery) in the Diocese of Nidaros. The small, brown, wooden church was built in a long church style in 1972 by the people on the island. The church seats about 55 people.

== History ==
The chapel was built on the site of the island's cemetery which was opened in 1921. The new chapel was completed in 1972 and consecrated on 8 October 1972. The altarpiece has a picture painted by Sigvald A. Pettersen in 1972 with a motif from the stable in Bethlehem.

== See also ==
- List of churches in Nidaros
