= Bjugn Church =

Church in Trøndelag, Norway

- Bjugn kirke
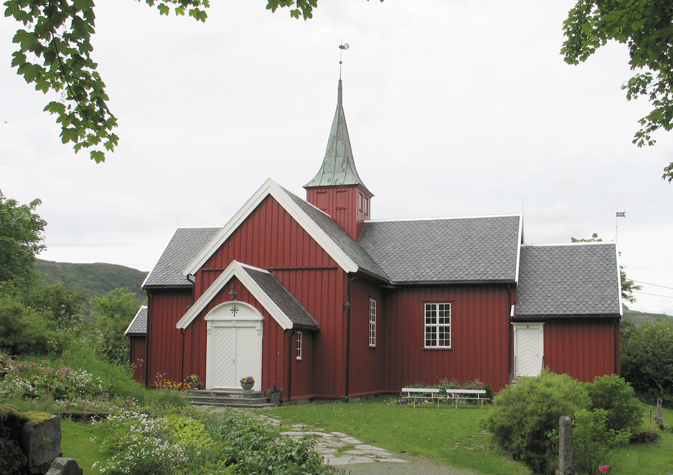
- View of the church
- Bjugn Church
- 63.75920989°N 09.73585438°E
- Location: Ørland Municipality, Trøndelag
- Country: Norway
- Denomination: Church of Norway
- Churchmanship: Evangelical Lutheran
- Website: kirken.no/bjugn

History
- Status: Parish church
- Founded: 1637
- Consecrated: 1956

Architecture
- Functional status: Active
- Architect: John Egil Tverdahl
- Architectural type: Cruciform
- Completed: 1956 (70 years ago)

Specifications
- Capacity: 250
- Materials: Wood

Administration
- Diocese: Nidaros bispedømme
- Deanery: Fosen prosti
- Parish: Bjugn
- Norwegian Cultural Heritage Site
- Type: Church
- Status: Not protected
- ID: 83901

Bjugn Church (Norwegian: Bjugn kirke) is a parish church of the Church of Norway in Ørland Municipality in Trøndelag county, Norway. It is located along the Bjugnfjorden about 5 kilometres (3.1 mi) west of the village of Botngård. It is the main church for the Bjugn parish which is part of the Fosen prosti (deanery) in the Diocese of Nidaros. The red, wooden church was built in a cruciform style in 1956 using plans drawn up by the architect John Egil Tverdahl. The church seats about 250 people.

== History ==
A royal resolution dated 10 January 1633 authorized the construction of the first church in Bjugn. The cruciform church was built in 1637. The old church burned down in a fire in 1952, but the altarpiece, baptismal font, and several other items were saved from the fire. The present church was rebuilt in 1956 on the same location using the same design as the previous church.

== Media gallery ==
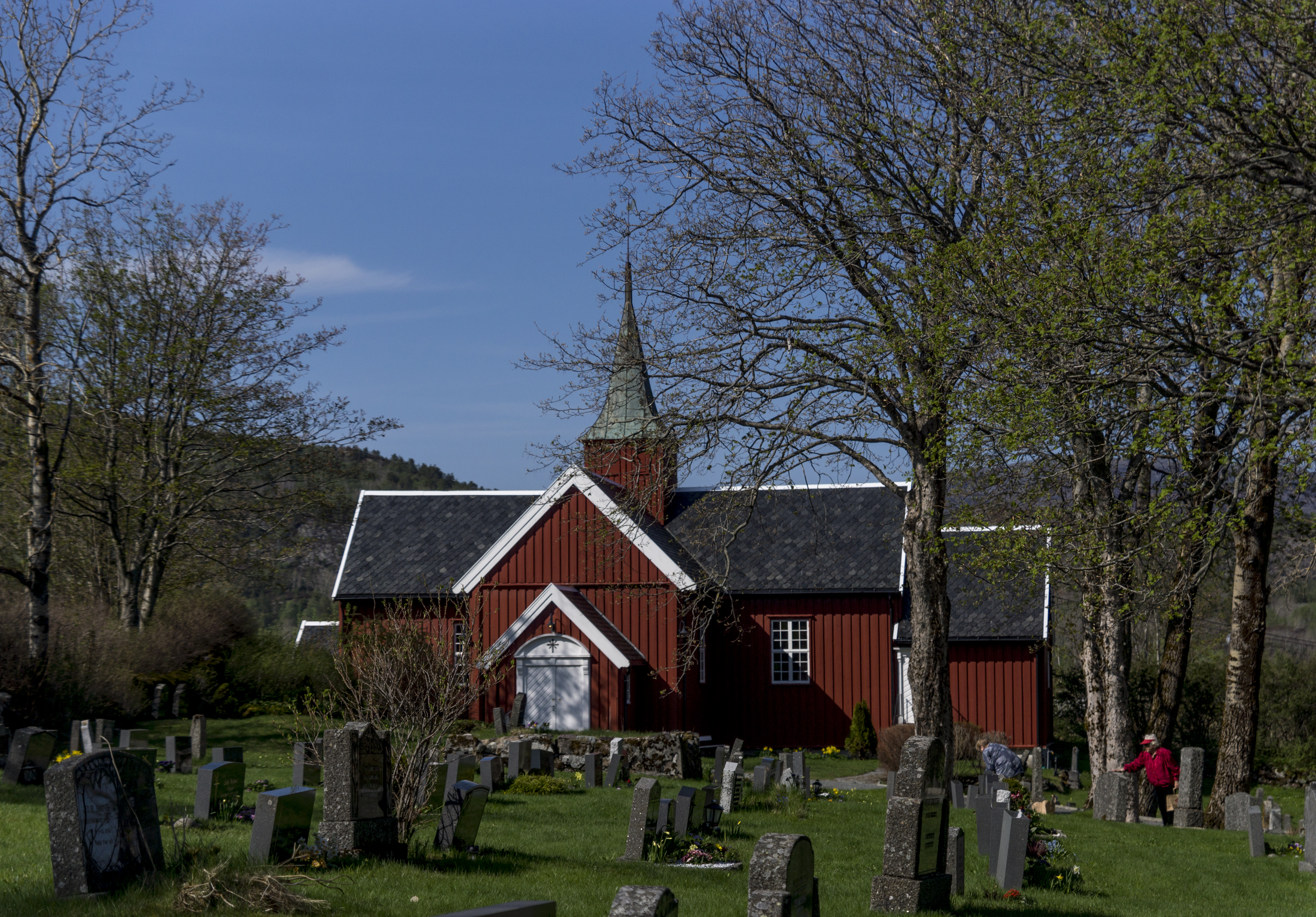
Bjugn Church and cemetery

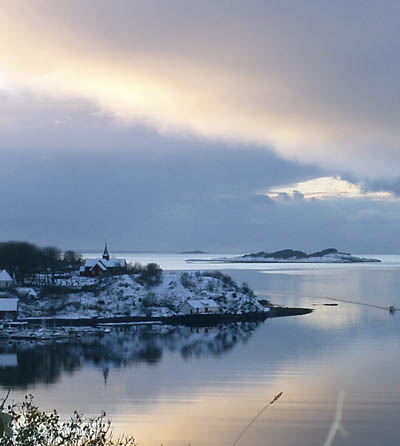
The church along the fjord

== See also ==
- List of churches in Nidaros
