= Bjugn (village) =

Village in Ørland Municipality, Norway

Bjugn Botngård (historic)
- Village
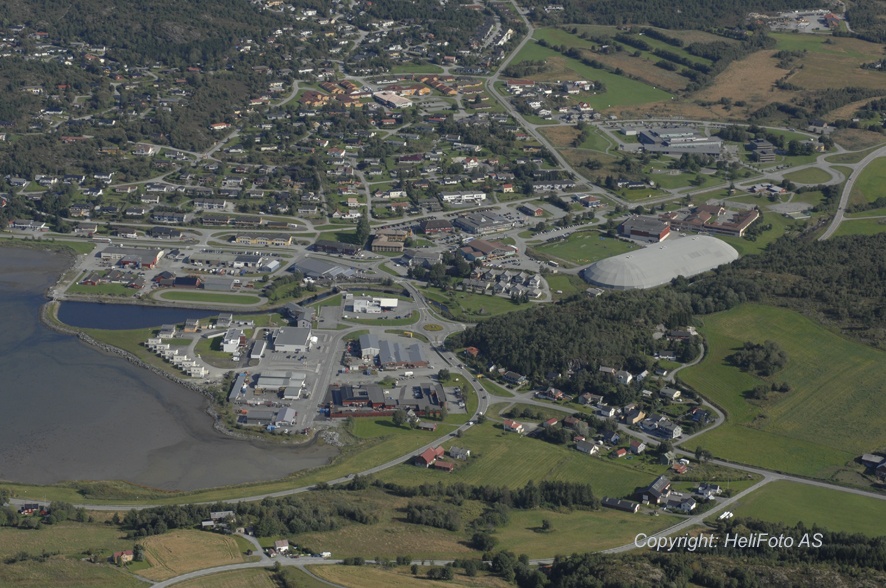
- View of the village
- Interactive map of Bjugn
- Location within Trøndelag Location within Norway
- Coordinates: 63.7648°N 09.8086°E
- Country: Norway
- Region: Central Norway
- County: Trøndelag
- District: Fosen
- Municipality: Ørland Municipality

Area
  - Total: 1.24 km^{2} (0.48 sq mi)
- Elevation: 7 m (23 ft)

Population (2024)
  - Total: 1,379
  - Density: 1,112/km^{2} (2,880/sq mi)
- Time zone: UTC+01:00 (CET)
  - Summer (DST): UTC+02:00 (CEST)
- Post Code: 7160 Bjugn

Bjugn (or historically Botngård) is the administrative centre of Ørland Municipality in Trøndelag county, Norway. The village is located at the end of the Bjugnfjorden. It is about 5 kilometres (3.1 mi) north of the village of Høybakken, about 12 kilometres (7.5 mi) east of the village of Nes, and about 9 kilometres (5.6 mi) south of village of Oksvoll.

The 1.24-square-kilometre (310-acre) village has a population (2024) of 1,379 and a population density of 1,112 inhabitants per square kilometre (2,880/sq mi). There is a videregående school in Botngård. Fosenhallen is one of only four indoor speed skating ovals in Norway. Bjugn Church is located about 4 kilometres (2.5 mi) west of the village, on the southern shore of the Bjugnfjorden.

== History ==
The village was the administrative centre of the old Bjugn Municipality from 1853 when the municipality was established until 2020 when the municipality was merged into Ørland Municipality. On 1 January 2020 (upon the merger of Bjugn and Ørland municipalities), the village became the new administrative centre of Ørland Municipality. Prior to 2020, Brekstad was the administrative centre of Ørland Municipality.

=== Name ===
The settlement was historically called Botngård. The village changed its name from Botngård to Bjugn at a meeting in March 2019 and this name change went into effect in September 2019. The former name, Botngård, was the name of a farm in the area, while the new name comes from the fjord and the old Bjugn Municipality. The reasoning behind the change was that on 1 January 2020, Bjugn Municipality was to be merged with Ørland Municipality and it was a local wish that the old municipal name should live on after the municipal merger, so the name was changed. After the merger this village became the administrative centre of the newly enlarged Ørland Municipality.

== Media gallery ==
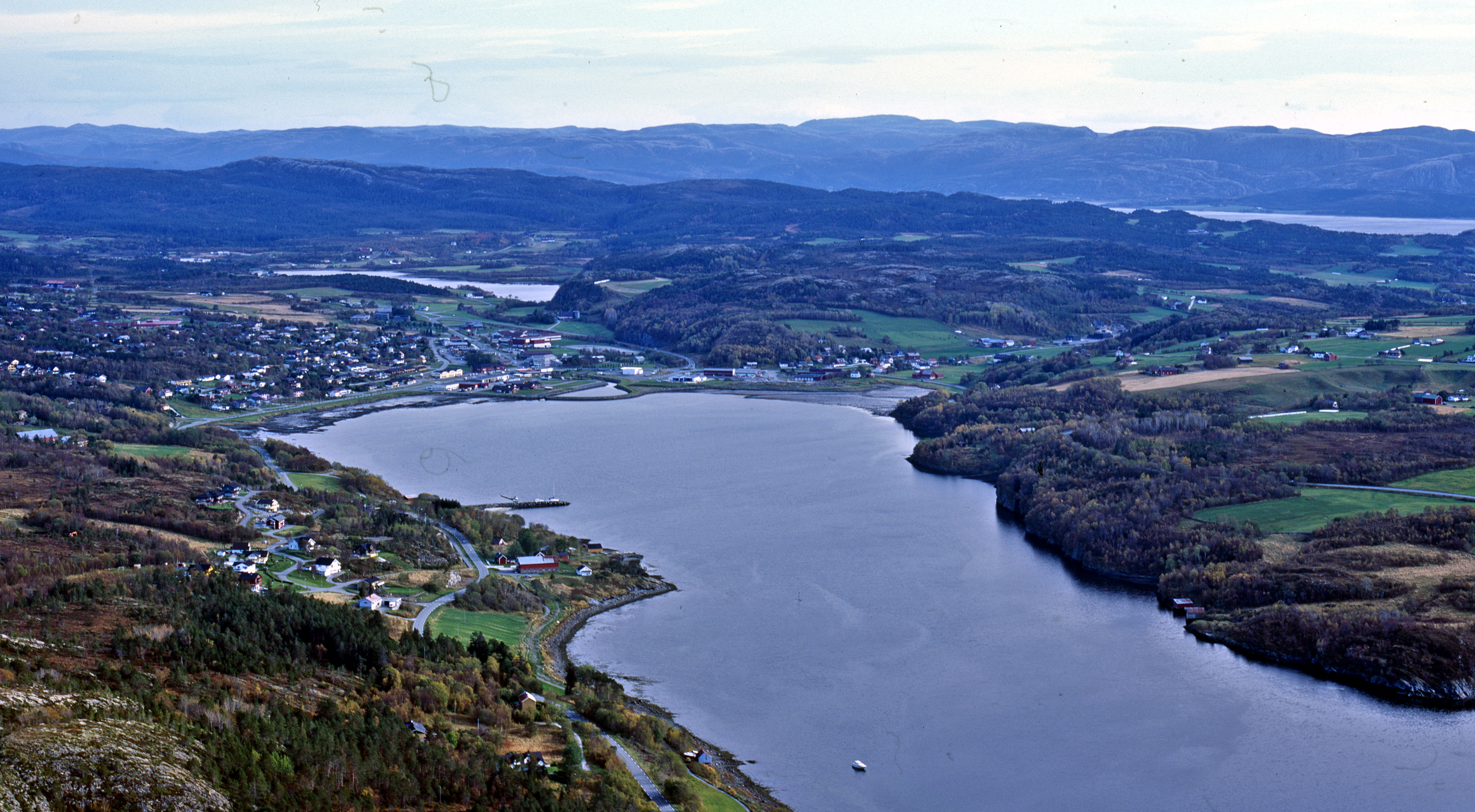
View of the village

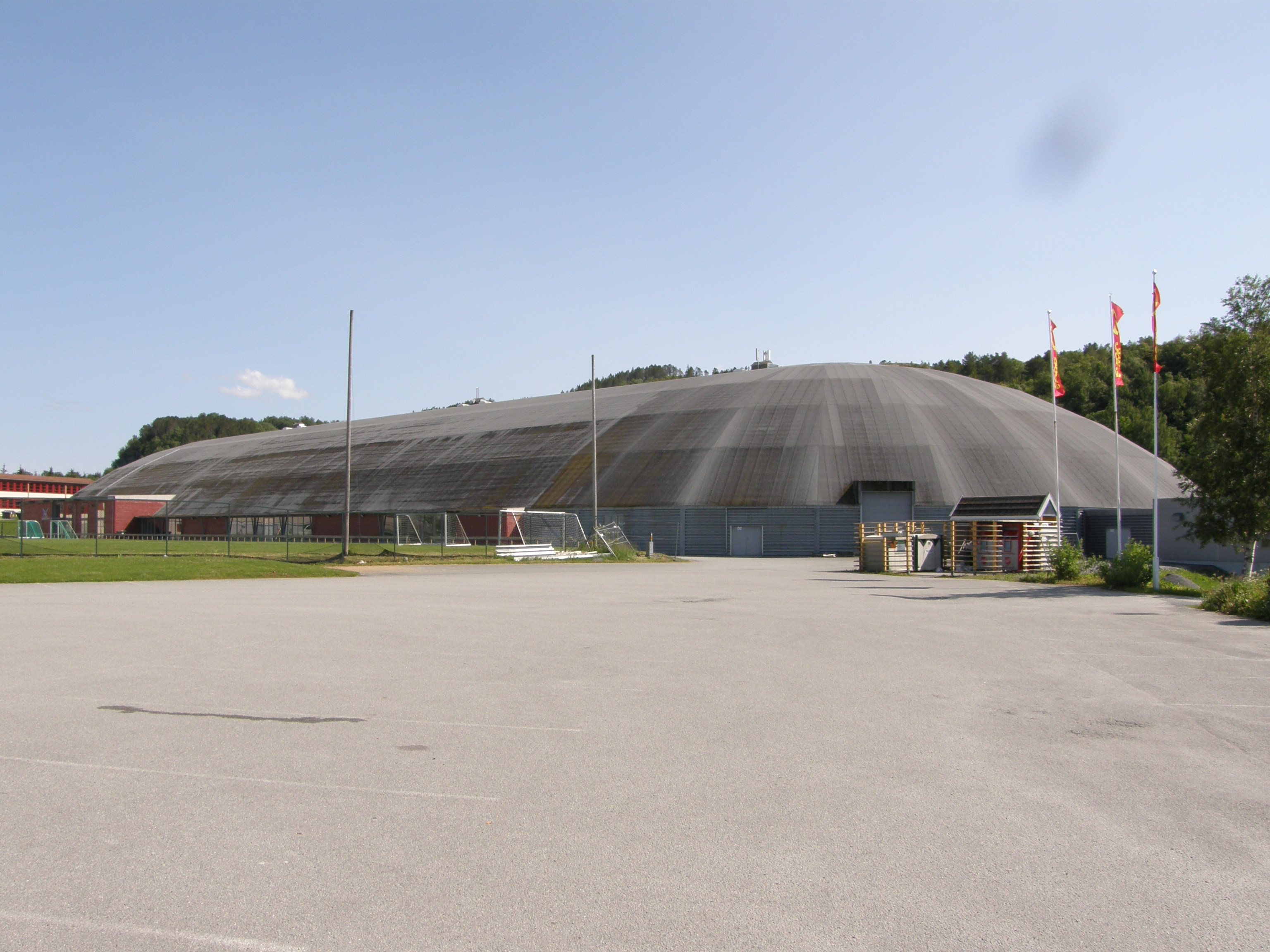
Fosenhallen

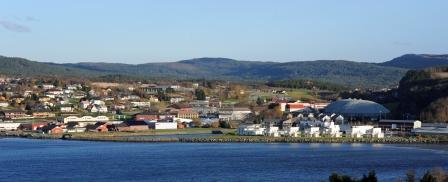

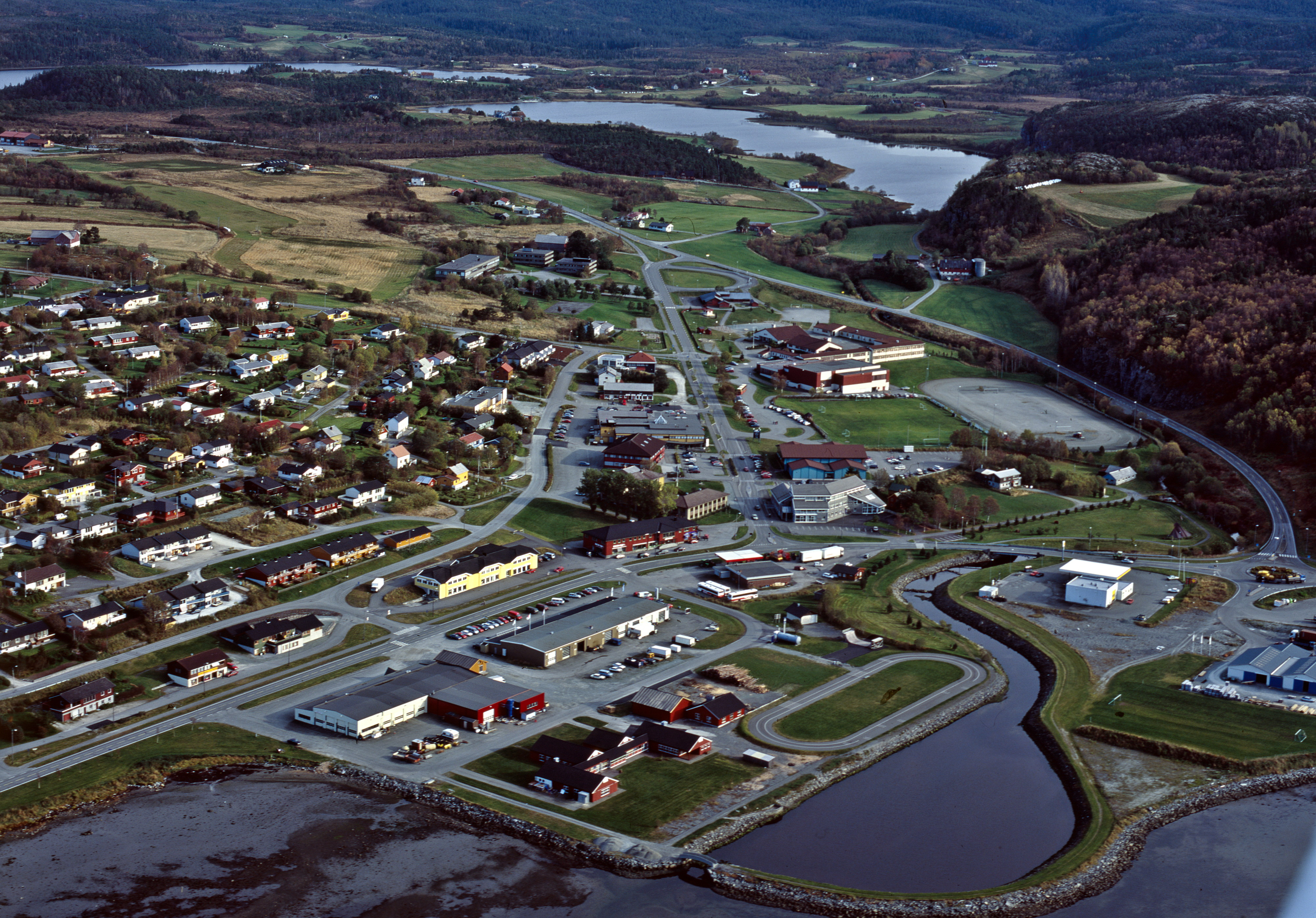

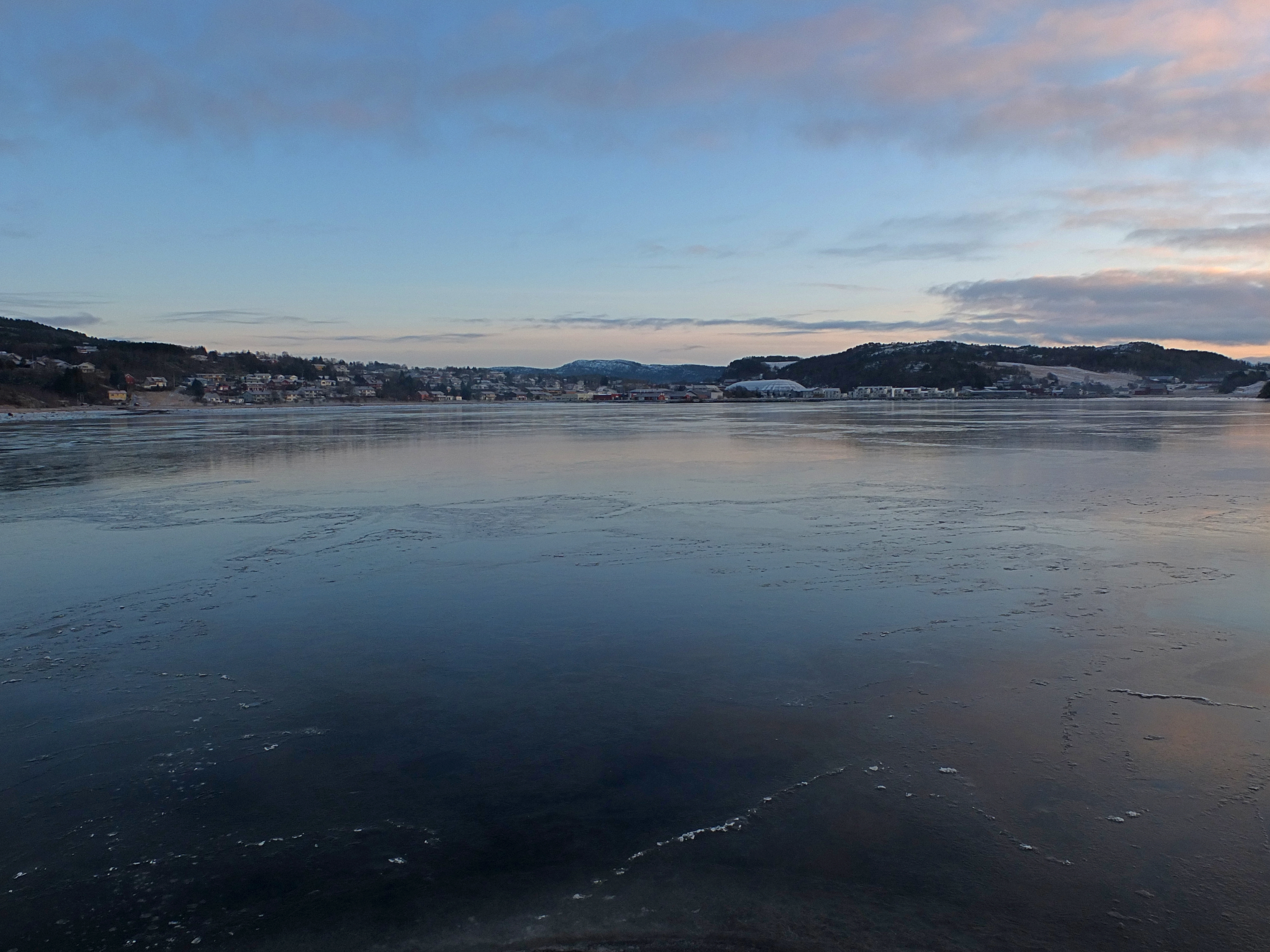
