= Tarva (Norway) =

Island group in Trøndelag, Norway

- Interactive map of Tarva

Geography
- Location: Trøndelag, Norway
- Coordinates: 63.8125°N 09.4207°E
- Area: 14 km^{2} (5.4 sq mi)

Administration
- Norway
- County: Trøndelag
- Municipality: Ørland Municipality

The Tarva islands are an archipelago in Ørland Municipality in Trøndelag county, Norway. The largest and only populated island is Husøya and the other larger islands are Været and Karlsøya. There are also many smaller surrounding islets and skerries. The islands are located about 8 kilometres (5.0 mi) west of the village of Nes on the mainland. Tarva is connected to the mainland via the Dybfest–Tarva Ferry.

The islands were owned by the Austrått manor until 1858. The Royal Norwegian Air Force has a firing range on the western islands. The small Tarva Chapel is located on the northern side of the main island.

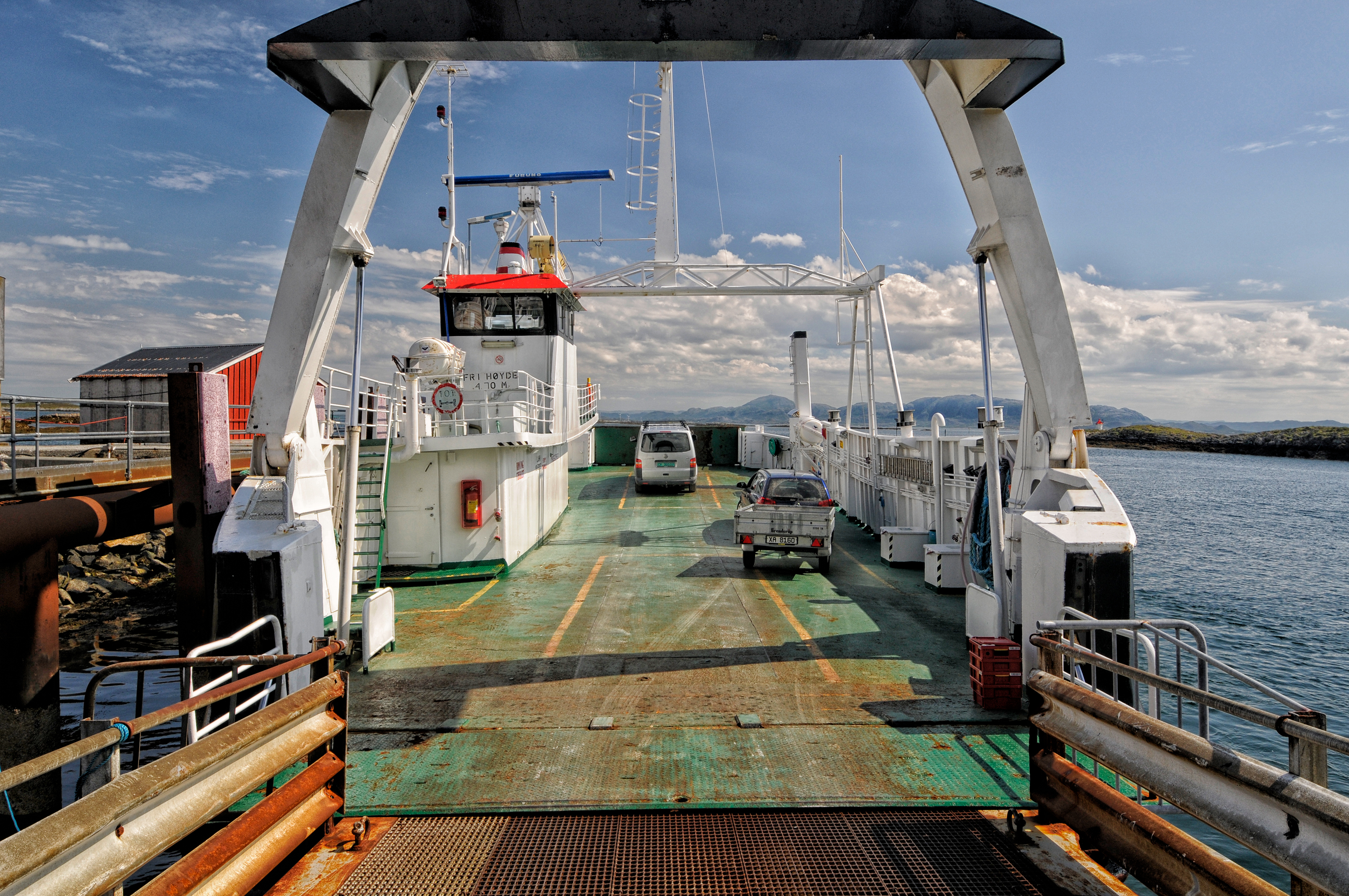
Ferry to Tarva

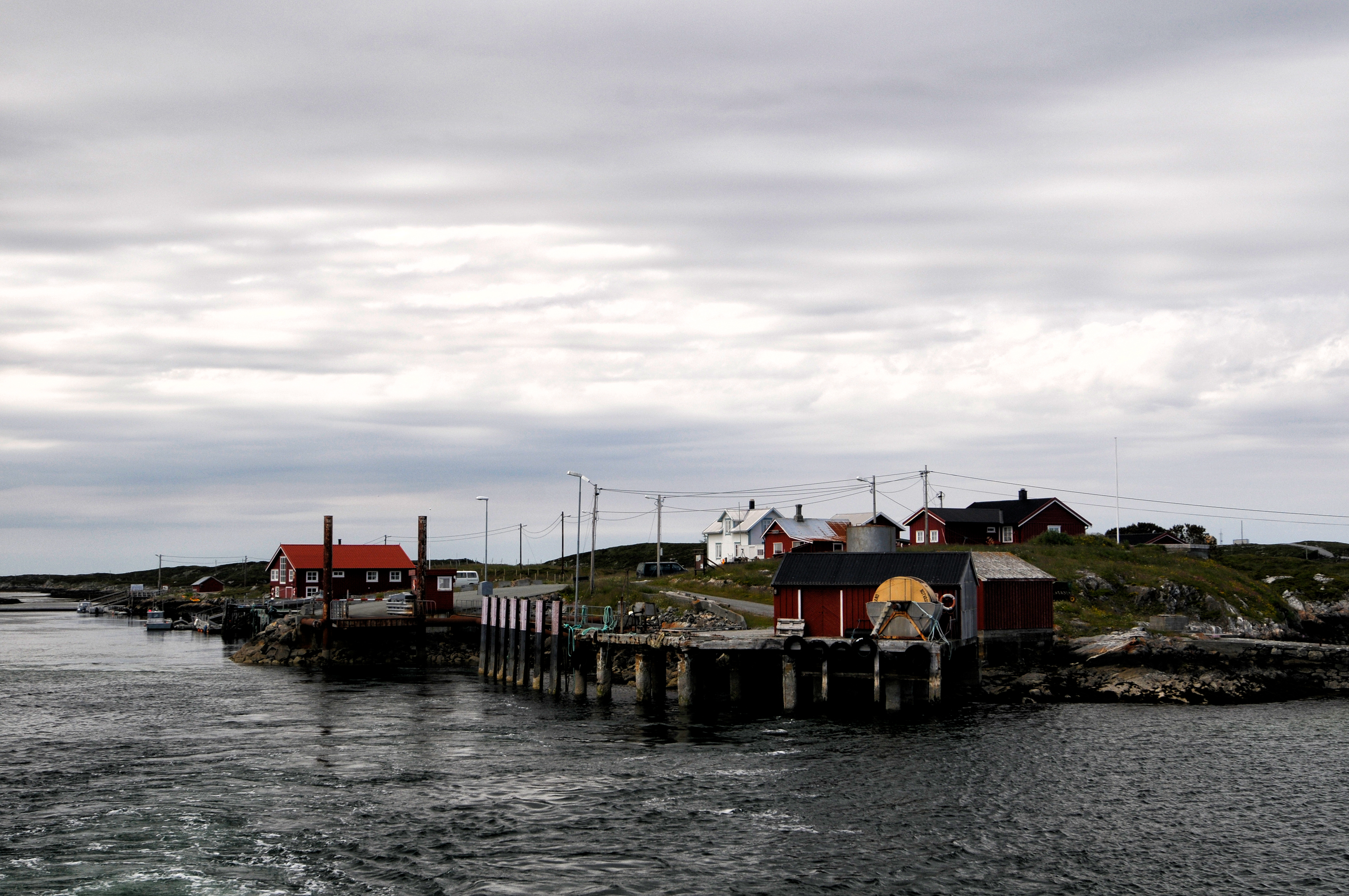
Tarva harbour

== See also ==
- List of islands of Norway
