= Jøssund, Ørland =

Village in Ørland Municipality, Norway

Jøssund
- Village
- Interactive map of Jøssund
- Location within Trøndelag Location within Norway
- Coordinates: 63.8444°N 09.7911°E
- Country: Norway
- Region: Central Norway
- County: Trøndelag
- District: Fosen
- Municipality: Ørland Municipality
- Elevation: 31 m (102 ft)
- Time zone: UTC+01:00 (CET)
  - Summer (DST): UTC+02:00 (CEST)
- Post Code: 7167 Vallersund

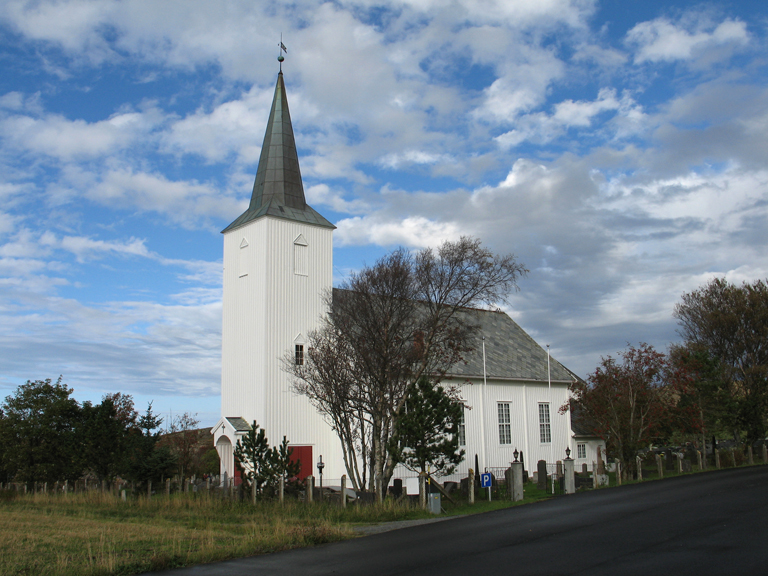
Jøssund church

Jøssund is a village in Ørland Municipality in Trøndelag county, Norway. The village is located about 4 kilometres (2.5 mi) across the fjord from the village of Lysøysundet and about 18 kilometres (11 mi) northeast of the village of Nes.

The village was a part of Jøssund Municipality from 1896 until 1964. The village of Jøssund is home to the Jøssund Church.
