= Nes, Ørland =

Village in Ørland Municipality, Norway

Nes
- Village
- Interactive map of Nes
- Location within Trøndelag Location within Norway
- Coordinates: 63.7706°N 09.5876°E
- Country: Norway
- Region: Central Norway
- County: Trøndelag
- District: Fosen
- Municipality: Ørland Municipality
- Elevation: 14 m (46 ft)
- Time zone: UTC+01:00 (CET)
  - Summer (DST): UTC+02:00 (CEST)
- Post Code: 7165 Oksvoll

Nes is a village in Ørland Municipality in Trøndelag county, Norway. The village is located on the western coast of the Fosen peninsula, just 8 kilometres (5.0 mi) east of the Tarva islands. Nes is located along the Norwegian County Road 115, about 12 kilometres (7.5 mi) west of the village of Bjugn. Nes Church is located in the village.

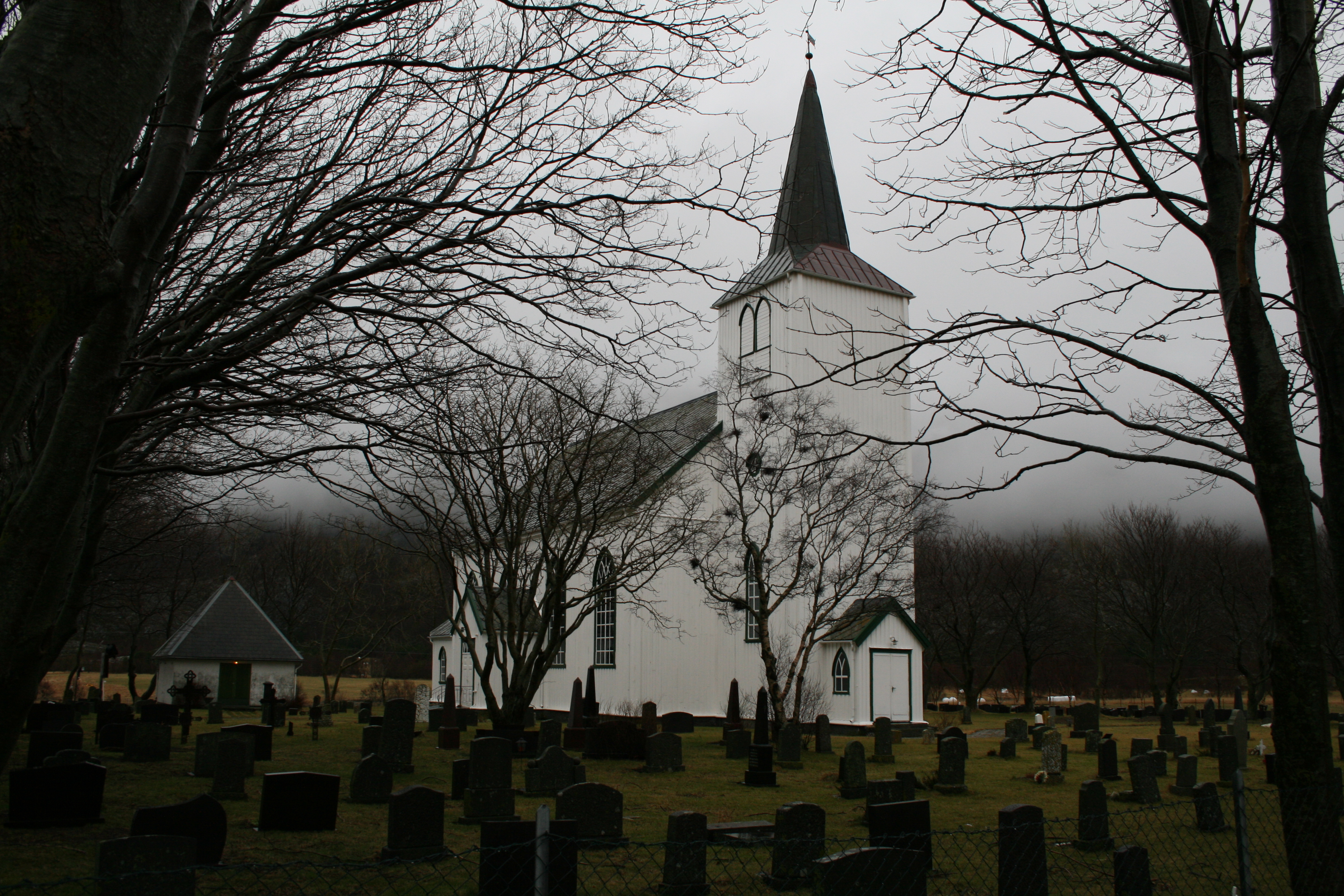
View of the Nes Church

The village was once the administrative centre of the old Nes Municipality which existed from 1899 until its dissolution in 1964.
