= Lysøysundet =

Village in Ørland Municipality, Norway

- Village
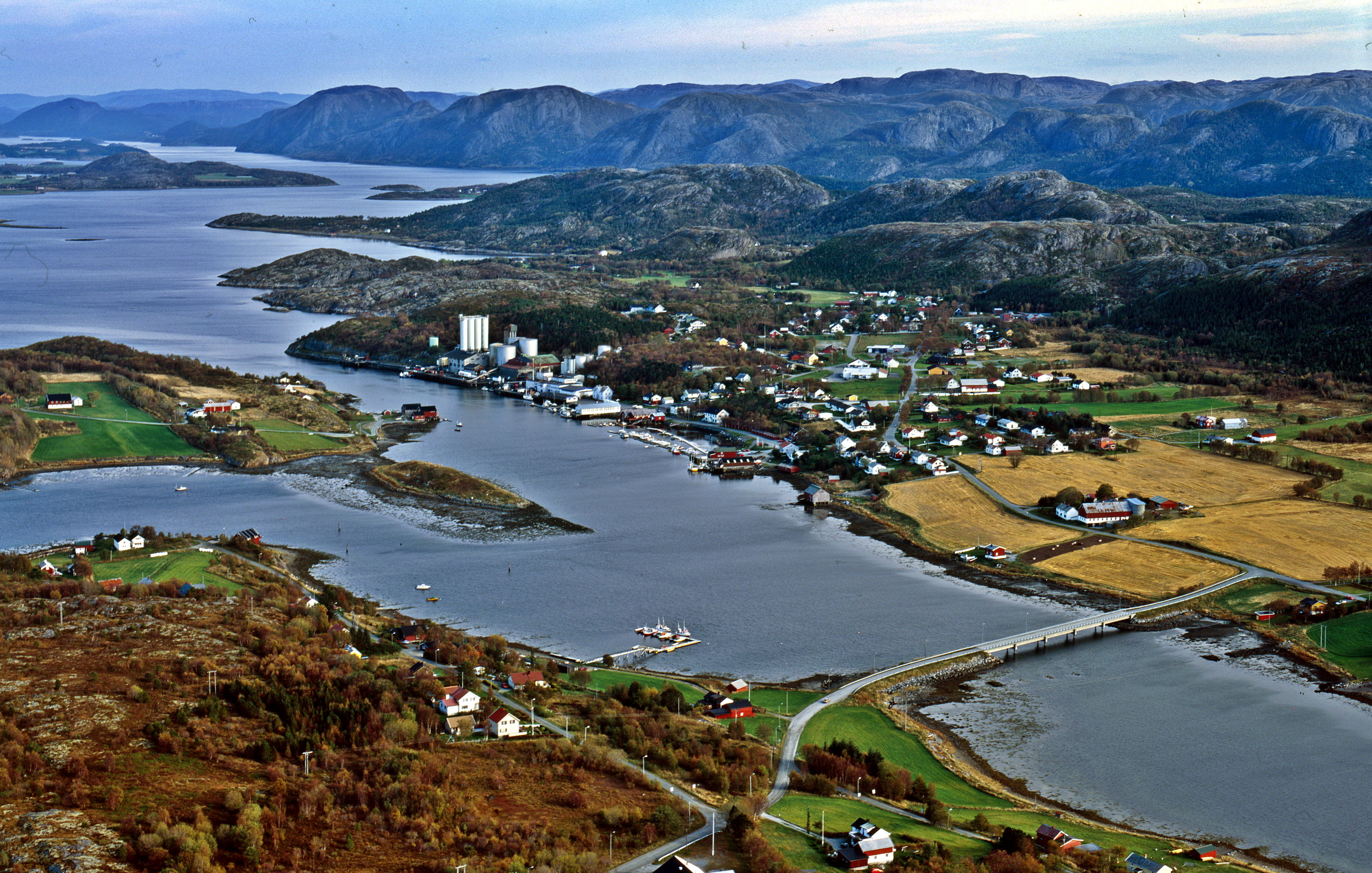
- View of the village
- Interactive map of Lysøysundet
- Location within Trøndelag Location within Norway
- Coordinates: 63.8846°N 09.8643°E
- Country: Norway
- Region: Central Norway
- County: Trøndelag
- District: Fosen
- Municipality: Ørland Municipality

Area
  - Total: 0.35 km^{2} (0.14 sq mi)
- Elevation: 15 m (49 ft)

Population (2024)
  - Total: 260
  - Density: 743/km^{2} (1,920/sq mi)
- Time zone: UTC+01:00 (CET)
  - Summer (DST): UTC+02:00 (CEST)
- Post Code: 7168 Lysøysundet

Lysøysundet is a village in Ørland Municipality in Trøndelag county, Norway. The village is located in the northern part of the municipality near the island of Lauvøya and the end of the Åfjorden. It is about 5 kilometres (3.1 mi) northeast of the village of Jøssund. The village lies on the mainland and on the nearby island of Lysøya which is connected by a bridge.

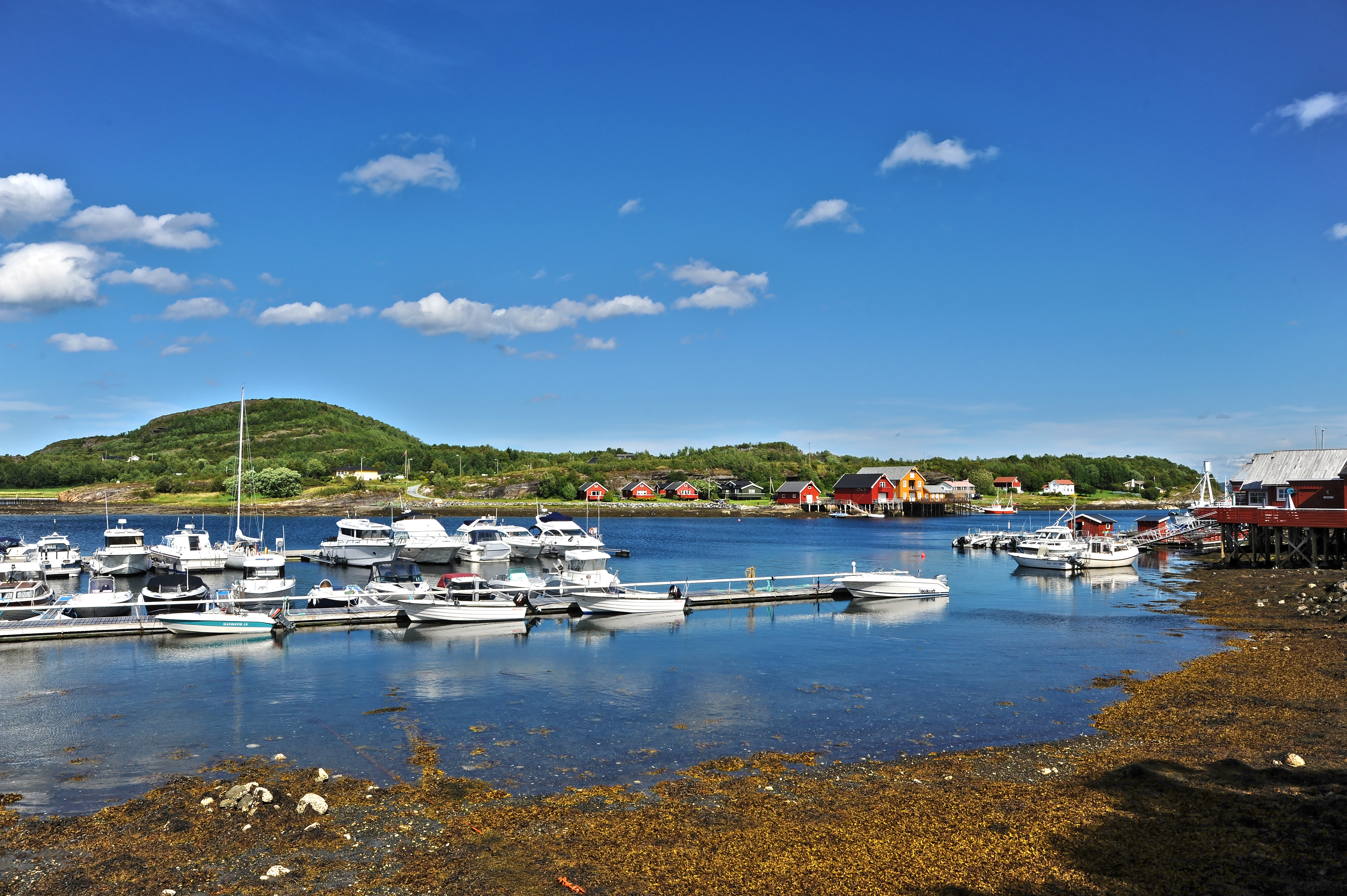
Lysøysund

The 0.35-square-kilometre (86-acre) village has a population (2024) of 260 and a population density of 743 inhabitants per square kilometre (1,920/sq mi). The village is divided into several areas: Lysøya, Rømmen, Hellesvika, Tiltrem, Olden, Teksdal, and Sundet. Lysøysundet has an elementary school, kindergarten, and a nursing home.
