= Faith Lutheran Church =

Faith Lutheran Church may refer to:

- Faith Lutheran Church (Junction City, Oregon)
- Faith Lutheran Church (Quincy, Massachusetts)
