= Anders Nilsson =

Anders Nilsson may refer to:

- Anders Nilsson (composer) (born 1954), Swedish composer
- Anders Nilsson (curler) (born 1957), Swedish curler
- Anders Nilsson (director) (born 1963), Swedish director, writer and photographer
- Anders Nilsson (ice hockey) (born 1990), Swedish ice hockey goaltender
- Anders Nilsson (scientist) (born 1956), Swedish scientist
- Anders Nilsson (songwriter) (born 1980), Swedish songwriter, record producer, singer and film critic
- Anders Nilsson (footballer), Swedish footballer

== See also ==
- Anders Nielsen (disambiguation)
- Anders Nilsen (disambiguation)
