= Anders Christian Nielsen =

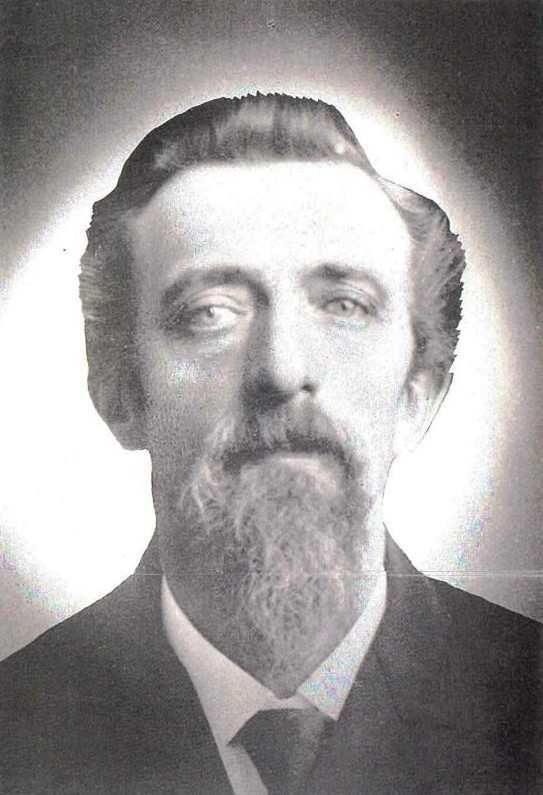
- Born: June 30, 1848
- Died: January 16, 1929 (aged 80)
- Occupation: Real Estate

Anders Christian Nielsen (June 30, 1848 – January 16, 1929), known only as A. C. Nielsen, was a real estate speculator in early 20th century Junction City, Oregon. His efforts helped to create a Danish farming community in Lane County, Oregon. The annual Scandinavian Festival would not exist without Mr. Nielsen's Danish colony. He also helped to found the Junction City Danish United Evangelical Lutheran Church, now known as Faith Lutheran Church (Junction City, Oregon).

In 1902, A. C. Nielsen left Tyler, Minnesota and purchased at auction 1600 acres east of Junction City, in an area now in the vicinity of Dane Lane. The land was auctioned by F. T. Plank and Company for Gait C. Millett. Millett later became Nielsen's real estate partner. Nielsen placed advertisements in a Danish language newspaper, the Dannevirke, in Cedar Falls, Iowa, for parcels of 10 to 60 acres. Another publication to carry the advertisements was Den Danske Pioneer in Omaha, Nebraska. The farms were purchased by European immigrants, many born in Denmark, and within a few months the Danish colony came into existence.
