= Anders Nielsen =

Anders Nielsen may refer to:

- Anders Nielsen (colonist), Danish colonist and acting governor of Tranquebar
- Anders Nielsen (politician) (1862–1914), Danish farmer, editor, politician, and minister for agriculture
- Anders Nielsen (badminton) (1967–2010), English badminton player
- Anders Nielsen (footballer, born 1970), Danish footballer who played for a number of Belgian clubs
- Anders Nielsen (footballer, born 1972), Danish footballer who played for a number of Dutch clubs
- Anders Nielsen (footballer, born 1986), Danish footballer
- Anders Peter Nielsen (1867–1950), Danish sport shooter Olympic champion
- Anders Christian Nielsen (1848–1929), real estate speculator in Junction City, Oregon
- Anders Nielsen, chief executive officer of MAN Truck & Bus

== See also ==
- Anders Nilsen (disambiguation)
- Anders Nilsson (disambiguation)
