= Anders Nilsen =

Anders Nilsen may refer to:

- Anders Nilsen (cartoonist) (born 1973), American cartoonist
- Anders Nilsen (musician) (born 1988), Norwegian singer, songwriter and music producer
- Anders Nilsen Næsset (1872–1949), Norwegian fisherman and MP
- Anders Nilsen Wiborg (1655–1718), fourth commander of the Christiansfjell Fortress in Norway

== See also ==
- Anders Nielsen (disambiguation)
- Anders Nilsson (disambiguation)
