= Eric Hays =

American basketball player-coach (born 1952)

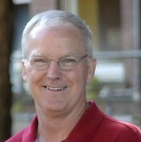
Eric Hays outside of Hellgate High School in Missoula, Montana, where he taught and coached basketball for 25 years. Photo taken on Sept. 1, 2010.

Eric Hays is a former University of Montana basketball player who served as head basketball coach of at Hellgate High School in Missoula, Montana, for 25 years. He was a mathematics teacher there until his retirement in 2009.

Hays is best remembered for his performance at the 1975 NCAA tournament against the powerhouse UCLA Bruins in the Sweet 16. He scored a game-high 32 points on 13-of-16 shooting, grabbed seven rebounds and dished out six assists in the Grizzlies' 67–64 loss to the eventual national champions, who had six players that went on to play in the NBA.

== Early life ==
Eric Hays was born July 4, 1952, in Junction City, Oregon, a farming community roughly 15 miles from Eugene and 25 miles from Corvallis. Hays lived there for the first 18 years of his life and attended Junction City High School where he was a two-year starter on the basketball team as well as the football team's quarterback for one season before injuring the growth plate in his shoulder during his sophomore year. His high school consisted of 450 students throughout three grades. Hays believed he would eventually raise a family in a similar community-oriented environment with a small school.

== College career ==
Hays attended Washington State University in Pullman, Washington. Originally, he planned on being an accountant, but changed his aspirations toward coaching after observing one of his brother's high school games, in which he thought the coaching was "unfair" to the players. Hays then declared his major as math education and pursued his goals of becoming a high school teacher and basketball coach.

Hays also pursued basketball at WSU because the Cougars allowed players to "walk-on," meaning non-recruited students could try out for the team. Hays defied the odds and made the freshman team of 20. Before the season began, he rose to the position of "sixth man," the first player off the bench during games. By the fourth game that season, Hays was one of the starting five and never relinquished the role. The Junction City native ended the season second in both scoring and rebounding on a team that finished with an outstanding record of 20–2. Midway through his freshman year, Hays was awarded a full-ride scholarship by the university due to his excellence on the court.

To his surprise, he was cut by the new head coach after only two days of tryouts his sophomore year of 1971. Head coach Marv Harshman had abruptly left to coach the University of Washington in July of that year. Hays then followed Washington State's former assistant coach, the legendary Jud Heathcote, and transferred to the University of Montana in January 1972. He again made the team as a walk-on the following year.

Hays' high school dream was realized in his final year as a collegiate basketball player. He had always wanted to play at the Memorial Coliseum in Portland, Oregon. At the twilight of his senior year, he was given the opportunity, and he didn't put it to waste. Entering the 1975 season, the Montana Grizzlies had never won an NCAA tournament game. This year would prove to be different as Hays and company posted a record of 21–8, including a 13–1 conference record en route to winning the Big Sky Conference championship, which earned them a bid to the tournament.

The Grizzlies defeated Utah State 69–63 in the first round, sending them to Portland and the Memorial Coliseum to face off against the mighty UCLA Bruins. The Bruins were led by coaching legend John Wooden and eventual NBA star Marques Johnson. Hays had the game of his life against a team that went on to win its 10th national championship in 12 years. In the final game of his college career, the 6-foot-3 Hays racked up a game- and career-high 32 points, almost singlehandedly willing his team to stay right with UCLA. Despite his efforts, Montana fell short 67–64, but the game continues to be talked about and Hays still is asked if he's "Eric Hays, the basketball player."

In college, Hays married his high school sweetheart, Deb, in 1973.

He graduated from UM with a degree in math education in the spring of 1975.

== Life after college ==
The left-handed Hays was taken in the ninth round of the 1975 NBA draft by the Milwaukee Bucks, but failed to make the team.

Eric and Deb Hays moved to Sheridan, Oregon, 75 miles north of Junction City, after his brief stint in Milwaukee. Hays took a job as the lone faculty member that made up the entire mathematics department at Sheridan High School, which consisted of 200 students in four grades. In addition to his teaching duties, he accepted positions as the assistant football coach, the junior varsity basketball coach and the head baseball coach at the high school.

Hays heard from a student that Heathcote was awarded the head basketball coaching job at Michigan State University. Again, he followed his former coach and helped out as a graduate assistant. He coached the JV team, went to the varsity practices, and helped recruit high school talent. Among those recruited were eventual NBA players Jay Vincent and Earvin "Magic" Johnson, a superstar member of the Basketball Hall of Fame.

The Montana Grizzly standout obtained his master's degree in mathematics in one year at MSU and was drawn back to Missoula by job openings in the math department as well as the head boys basketball coaching position at Hellgate High School. Along with newly born twin daughters, Kelly and Kristy, the Hayses moved back to Missoula in 1977. Their son, Jeff, was born in 1983, and another set of twin girls, Molly and Mandy, was born in 1985.

=== Coaching career ===
Hays went on to coach the Missoula Hellgate Knights for 25 years, racking up more than 350 wins, the most in school history, and three state championships in 1985, 1990 and 1993.

According to Hays, the 1993 team stood out as the most talented team he had coached. The team went undefeated at 23–0 in a season that featured a regular season-ending game against then undefeated Billings West. Hellgate prevailed and went on to close out the season without a loss, defeating Billings West again in the championship, this time 71–68 in double overtime. It was the first time in 20 years that a team had gone undefeated. Hays' 1993 team was led by eventual Montana Grizzly starter J.R. Camel.

In 1985, Hays' boys took down crosstown rival Big Sky 52–47 for the first of Hays' three championships. The team finished 18–6.

The 1990 Knights again finished 18–6 en route to Hays' second championship as Hellgate downed the Butte Bulldogs 57–51.

Hays came close an undefeated season in 1988 as his team had a spotless record until it lost to Bozeman 50–42 in the championship game.

=== Teaching career ===
Hays returned to his home-state of Oregon for a brief stint at Sheridan High School as the only mathematics teacher at the school stretching from 1975 to 1976.

Upon finishing graduate school, he became a mathematics teacher as well as the head boys' basketball coach at Hellgate High School in Missoula. He continued teaching math for 32 years from 1977 to 2009.

=== Current life ===
Along with the rest of the 1975 Sweet 16 team under coach Heathcote, Hays was inducted into the Montana Sports Hall of Fame on Nov. 12, 2010. He teamed with eventual 1978 NBA fourth overall pick Michael Ray Richardson (New York Knicks) to lead the 1975 Grizzlies on their historic journey to the NCAA tournament.

Hays is currently working as a volunteer assistant coach alongside his son, Jeff, who is following in his father's footsteps and has recently accepted the head coaching position at Hellgate.

In addition to his volunteer coaching role, Hays is also working as a financial investor and retirement planner. He is currently working with SII (Service, Innovation, Integrity) investments in Missoula.
