= Junction City School District 69 =

School district in Oregon

Address
- 325 Maple Street Junction City, Oregon, 97448; United States

District information
- Superintendent: Troy Stoops
- Chair of the board: Kristina Holton
- NCES District ID: 4106930

Students and staff
- Students: 1,580

Other information
- Website: www.junctioncity.k12.or.us

Junction City School District No. 69 (JCSD) is a public school district headquartered in Junction City, Oregon. The district serves Junction City and surrounding areas of unincorporated Lane County, Oregon, including the communities of Cheshire and Franklin.

The district had an enrollment of 1,580 and a student–teacher ratio of 16.43 during the 2024-2025 school year. The annual budget for the district was approximately $28.7 million in the 2022-2023 school year.

== Schools ==
JCSD currently operates four traditional schools for K-12 students:

- Junction City High School, serving students in grades 9-12.
- Laurel Elementary School, serving students in grades K-5.
- Oaklea Middle School, serving students in grades 6-8.
- Territorial Elementary School, serving students in grades K-5.

In addition to these four schools, JCSD operates an alternate hybrid online school program, JC Options, and a district-run preschool for children ages 3-5.

== District leadership ==
JCSD is governed by a seven-member elected school board, formally known as the Board of Directors. Board members are elected to four-year terms. The Board is chaired by Kristina Holton. Ryan Ceniga, who serves as the commissioner for West Lane District 1 on the Board of County Commissioners, also serves as a member of the JCSD Board.

JCSD has been led by Superintendent Troy Stoops since July 1, 2021. Prior to Stoops' selection, Kathleen Rodden-Nord served the district as superintendent for 18 years.

== Bond measures ==
The two most recent JCSD school bond measures were both rejected by district voters. Measure 20-355, a $59 million bond, was rejected by 56.87% of voters in May 2024. Measure 20-368, a smaller $40 million bond with a reduced scope, was rejected by 61.32% of district voters a year later in May 2025.

== Controversies ==
During the 2025-2026 school year, JCSD was named in two lawsuits involving alleged misconduct by a former Junction City High School teacher. The suits, filed by two former JCSD students, allege child sexual battery, premises liability, negligence, and discrimination. Combined, the cases could require JCSD to pay up to $1.25 million in damages.
