= Dari Mart =

Convenience store chain in Oregon

- Company type: Dari Mart's logo
- Industry: Retail
- Founded: 1965; 61 years ago
- Headquarters: Junction City, Oregon, United States
- Number of locations: 44
- Key people: Gladys Gibson, Pat Straube President, Kurt Straube VP, Kathy Gibson VP
- Products: Convenience store operator
- Number of employees: 450
- Website: www.darimart.com * Official Dari Mart Stores Instagram * Official Dari Mart Stores Facebook

Dari Mart is a chain of convenience stores located in the U.S. state of Oregon. Dari Mart has 44 stores (as of 2019) located exclusively within the Willamette Valley of Oregon, from Albany to Cottage Grove. It is most notable as a supplier of milk, ice cream, and other dairy products from Lochmead Farms, one of the largest independent dairy farms in the Pacific Northwest. Most store locations are in the Eugene-Springfield metropolitan area in Lane County, Oregon, while several stores are located in rural communities in Lane, Linn and Benton Counties. Lochmead Farms sells 1.5 million US gallons (5,700,000 L) of milk and 500,000 US gallons (1,900,000 L) of ice cream a year through the chain of stores, and the joint store-farm operation employs more than 500 people. The company has started selling dairy products internationally as well.

In 2014 the company began expanding beyond the convenience store model and opened Dari Market (Store #50) in Pleasant Hill, the first location to offer full-service grocery shopping. Also added in 2014 was the Fresh to Go array of healthy foods prepared and packaged in the Dari Mart Kitchen. These healthy food options include sandwiches, wraps, and salads distributed to all Dari Mart locations and to various outside buyers such as the local universities.

== History ==
The first Dari Mart store opened in 1965 as a way to market the farm's dairy products. Gladys and Howard Gibson established Lochmead Farms in 1941, and has been owned for three generations by the Gibson family of Junction City, Oregon. Today, about 20 Gibson family members spread across three generations work with the Dari Mart and Lochmead Farm companies. Portraits of family members' children playing on hay bales, with young farm animals, etc. are featured prominently in most store locations.
