= Kjeungskjær Lighthouse =

Lighthouse in Trøndelag, Norway

Kjeungskjær Lighthouse Kjeungskjær fyr
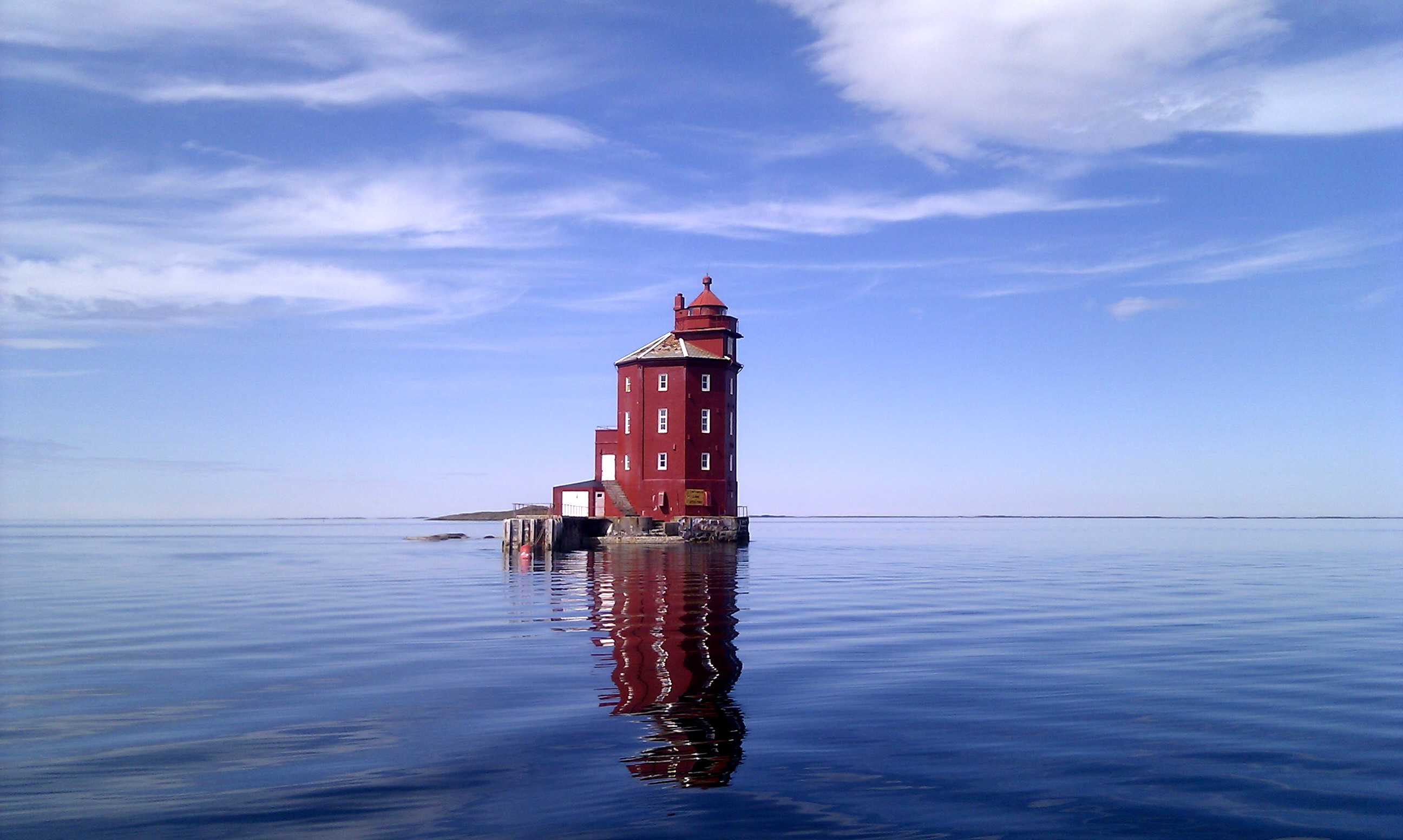
- View of the lighthouse
- Location: Trøndelag, Norway
- Coordinates: 63.7269°N 09.5306°E

Tower
- Constructed: 1880
- Foundation: Stone
- Construction: Stone
- Automated: 1987
- Height: 20.6 metres (68 ft)
- Shape: Octagonal tower
- Markings: Red
- Heritage: cultural property

Light
- Focal height: 17.5 metres (57 ft)
- Lens: Fresnel lens
- Intensity: 14,400 candela
- Range: Red: 5.9 nmi (10.9 km; 6.8 mi) Green: 5.6 nmi (10.4 km; 6.4 mi) White: 8 nmi (15 km; 9.2 mi)
- Characteristic: Oc WRG 6s
- Norway no.: 472900

The Kjeungskjær Lighthouse (Norwegian: Kjeungskjær fyr) is a coastal lighthouse in Ørland Municipality in Trøndelag county, Norway. The lighthouse is located on a tiny island at the mouth of the Bjugnfjorden about 3.5 kilometres (2.2 mi) west of the village of Uthaug and 5 kilometres (3.1 mi) south of the village of Nes.

== Description ==
The lighthouse was built in 1880 and automated in 1987. Prior to being automated, the lighthouse keeper and his family lived on the lower floors of the building.

The 17.5-metre (57 ft) tall lighthouse is made of stone with an octagonal-shaped tower that is painted red. The 14,400-candela light sits at the top at an elevation of 20.5 metres (67 ft) above sea level. The white, red, or green light (depending on direction), occulting once every 6 seconds. There is a fresnel lens that has been in use since 1906. It can be seen for up to 8 nmi (15 km; 9.2 mi). The lighthouse is lit every year from July 21 until May 16. It is dark during the late spring and early summer months due to the midnight sun.

== Media gallery ==
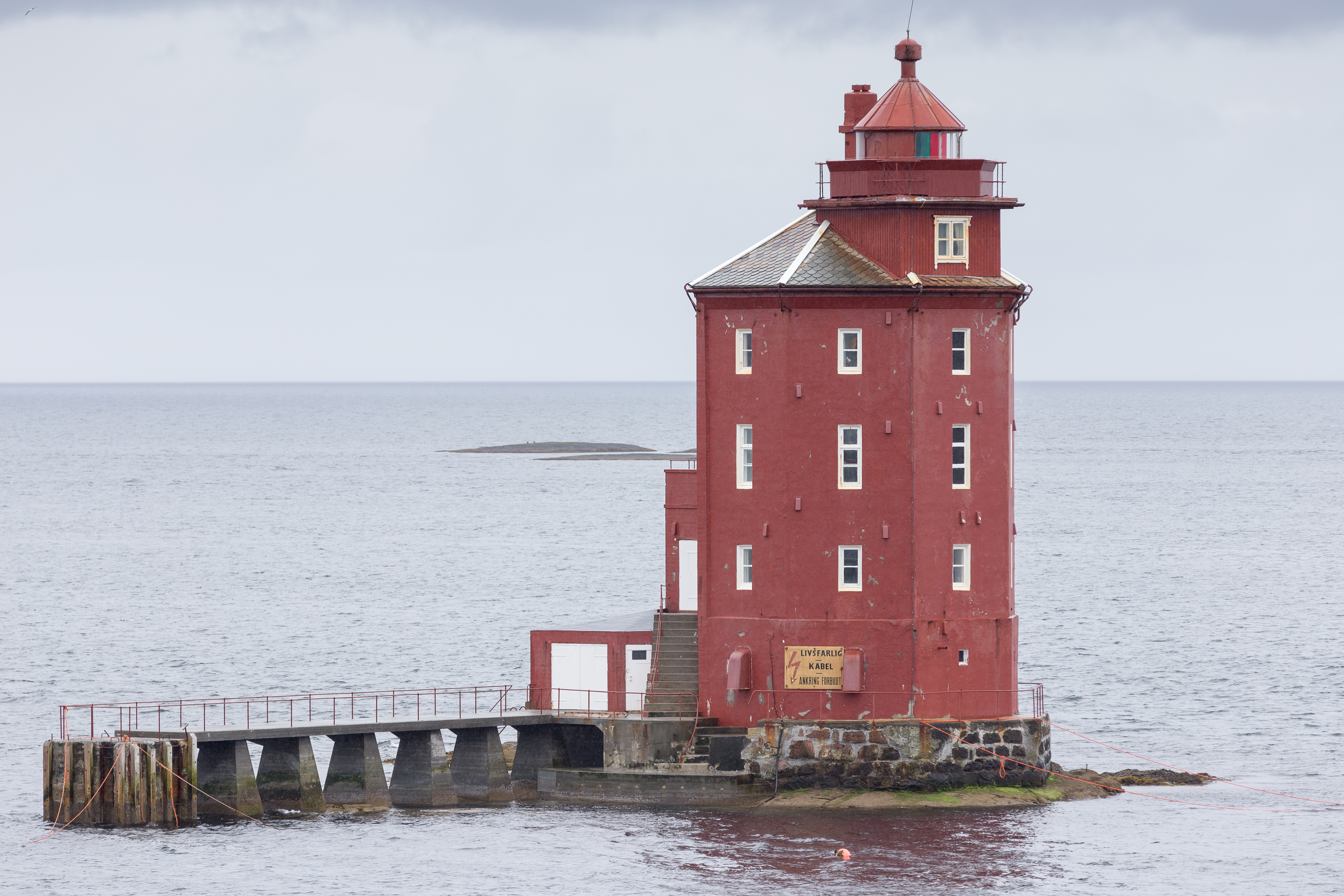

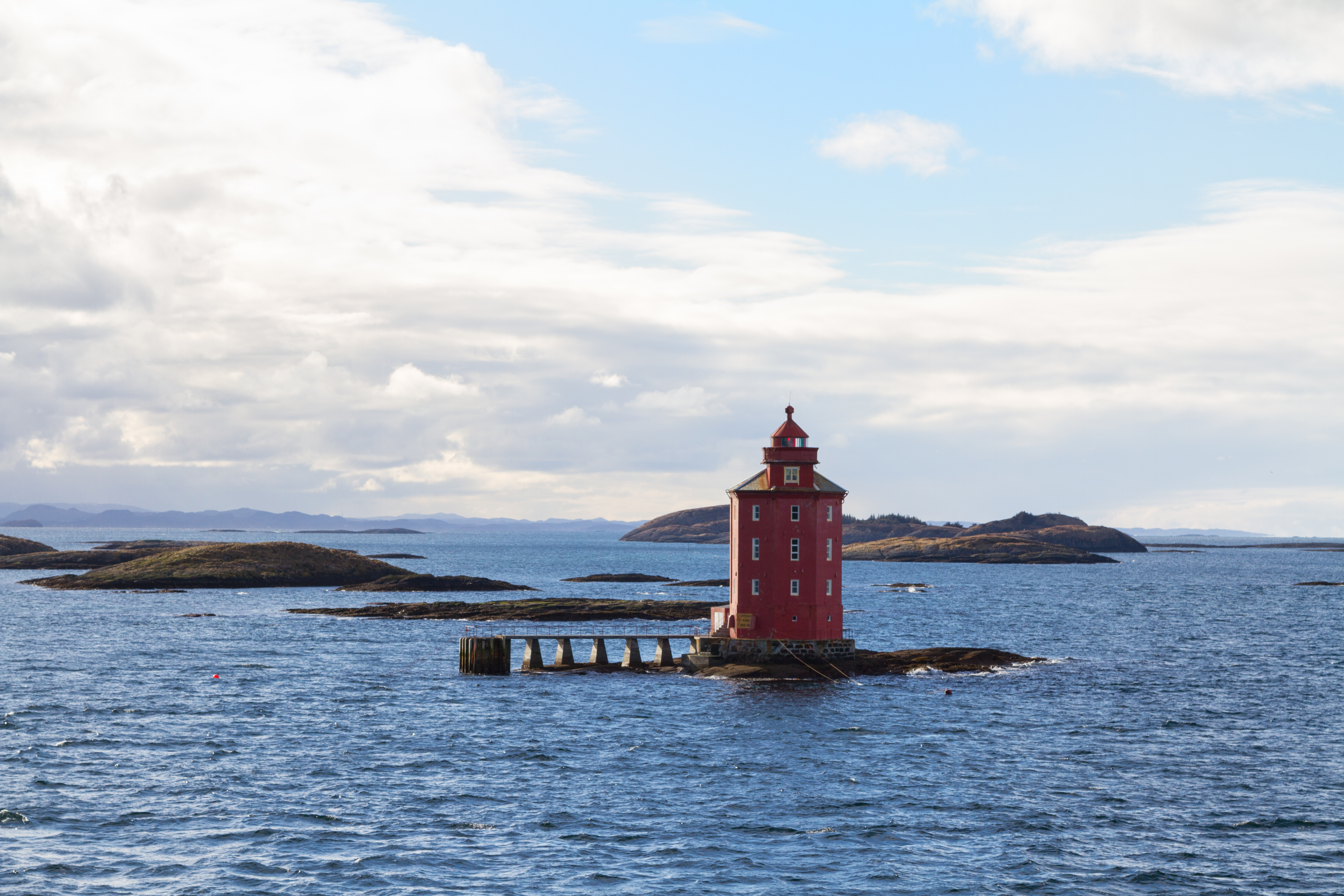

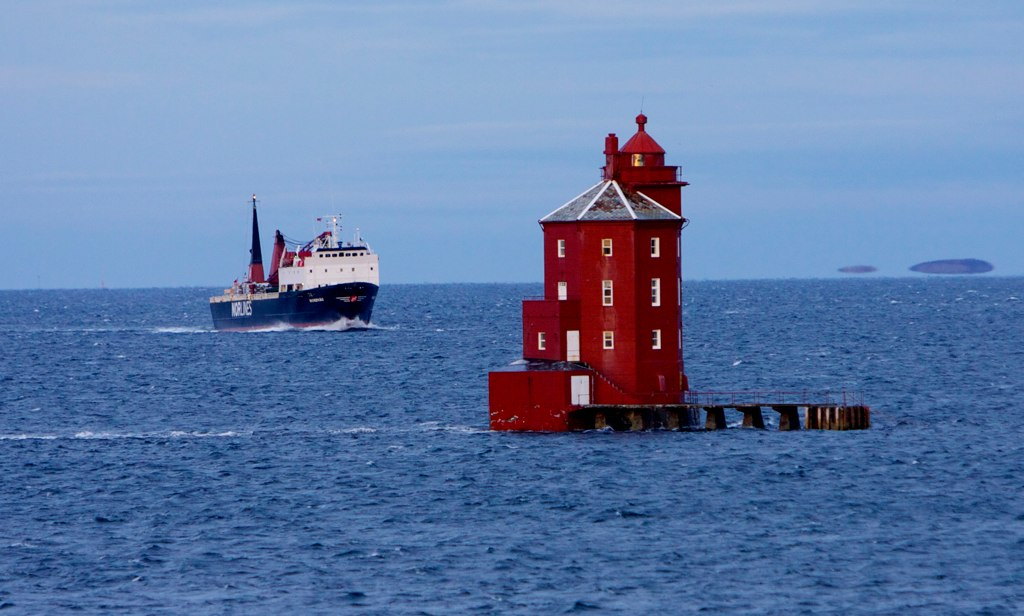

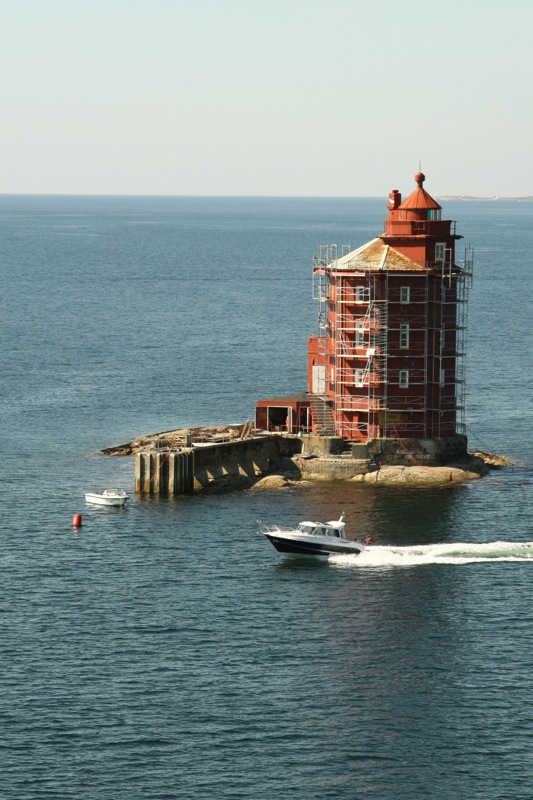

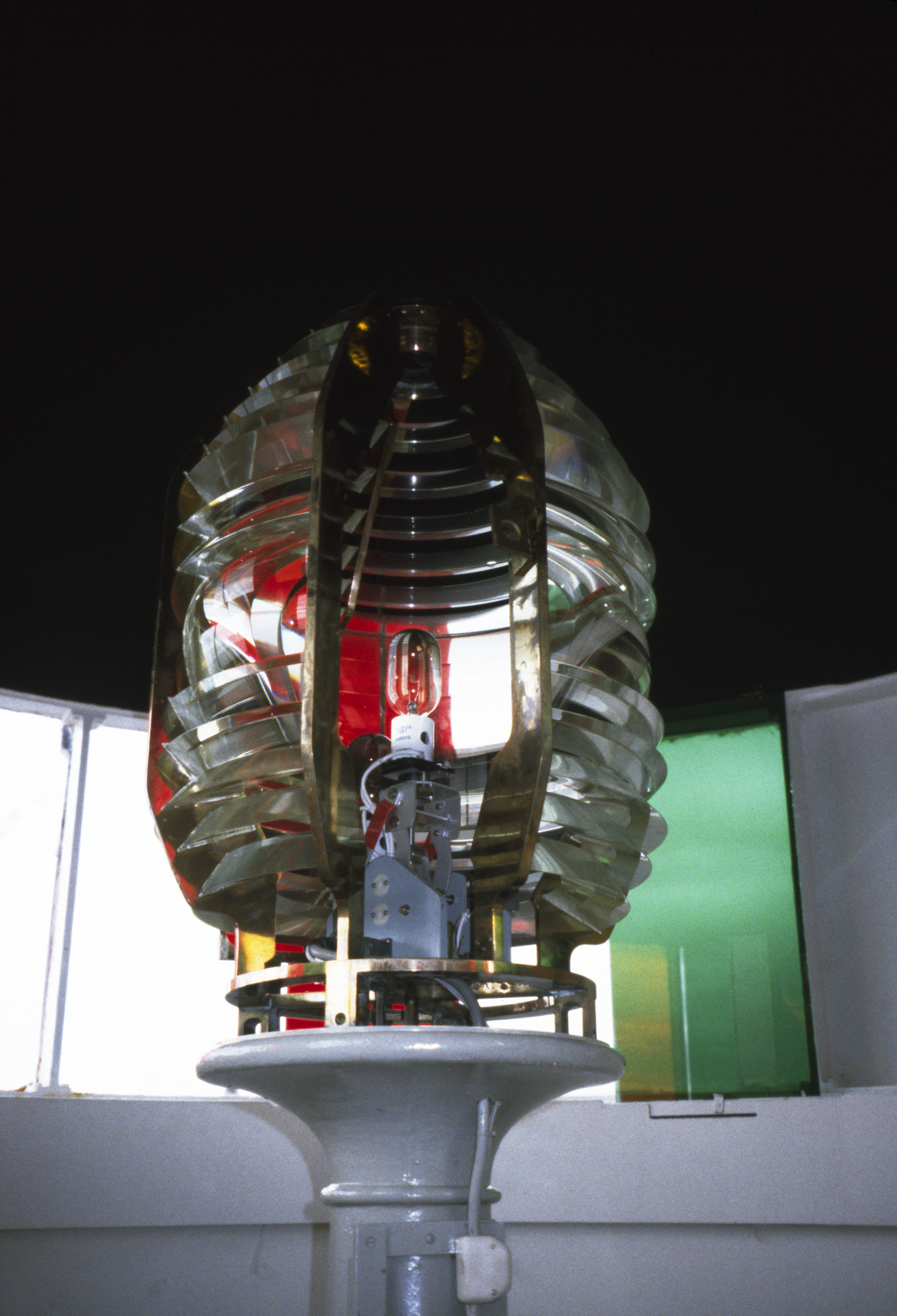

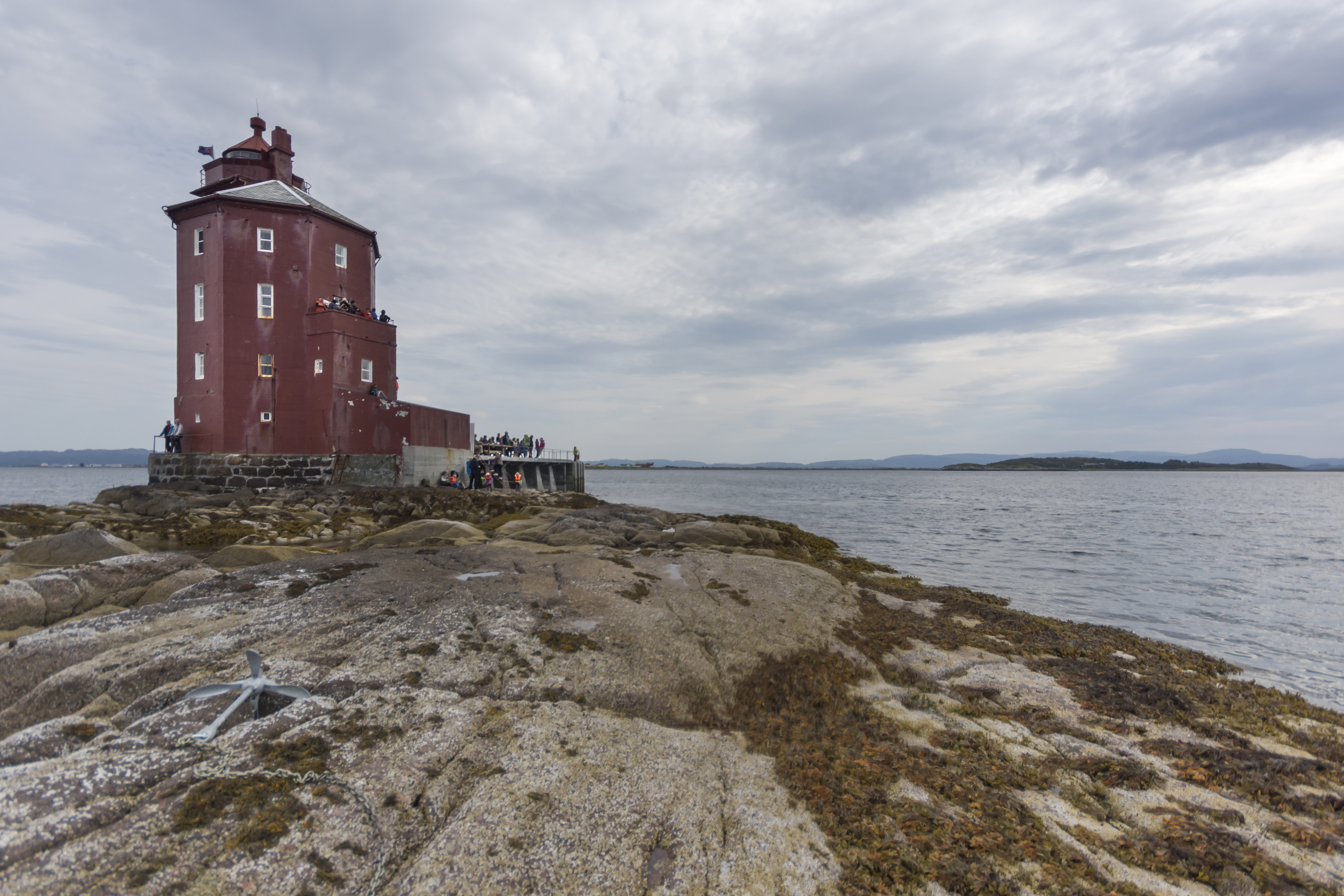

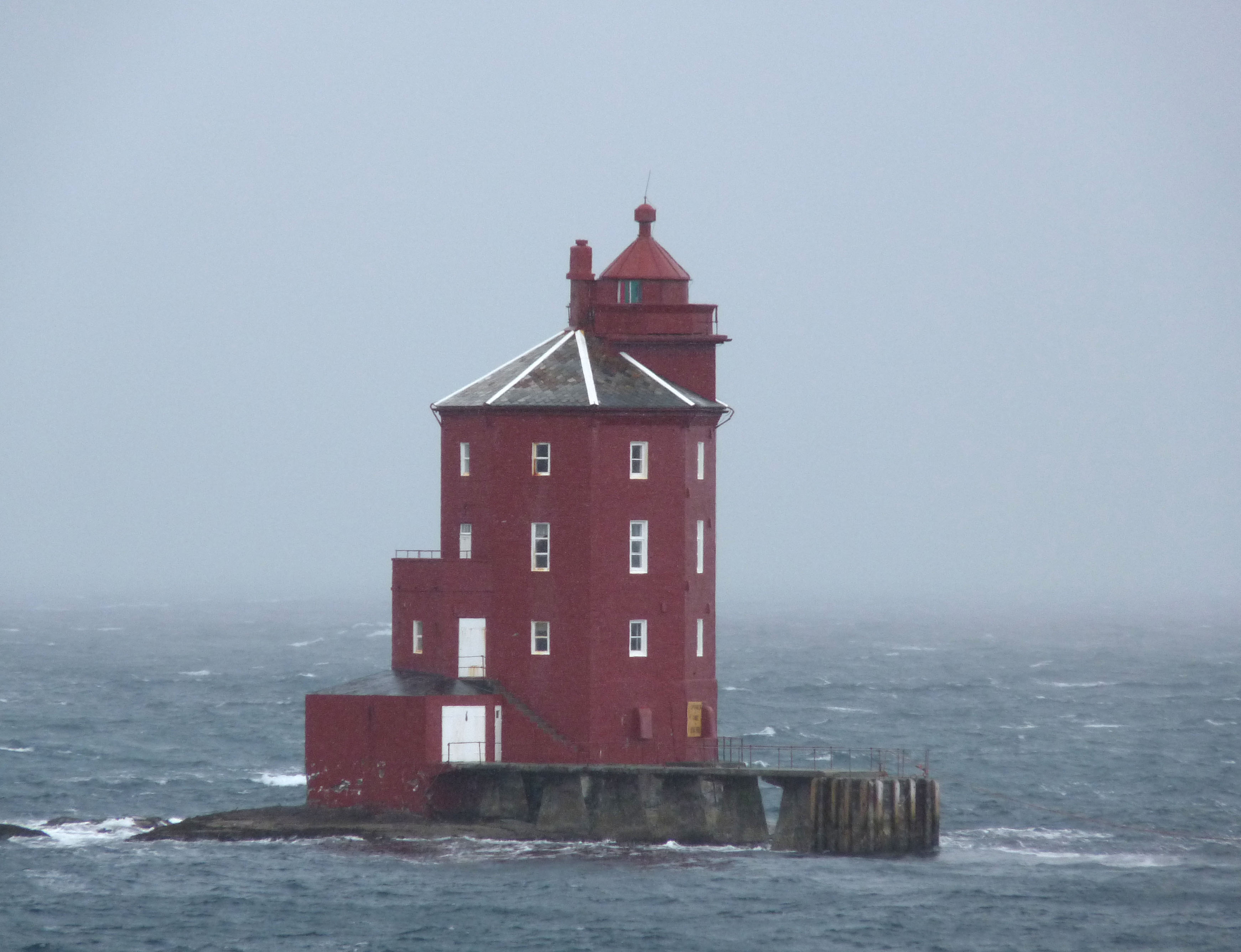

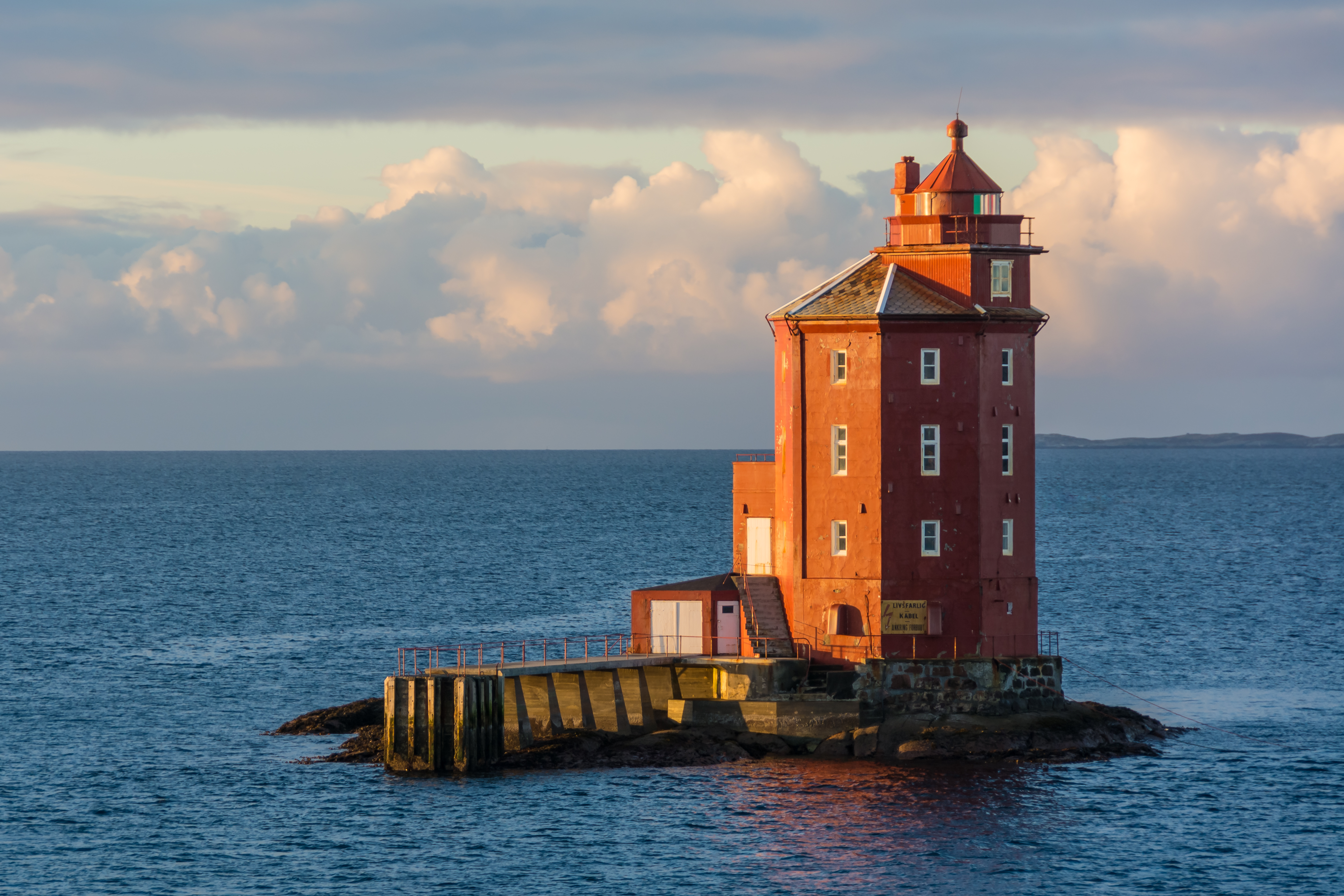

== See also ==
- Lighthouses in Norway
- List of lighthouses in Norway
