= Faith Lutheran Church (Junction City, Oregon) =

Church building in Oregon, US

Coordinates: 44.219372°N 123.210741°W

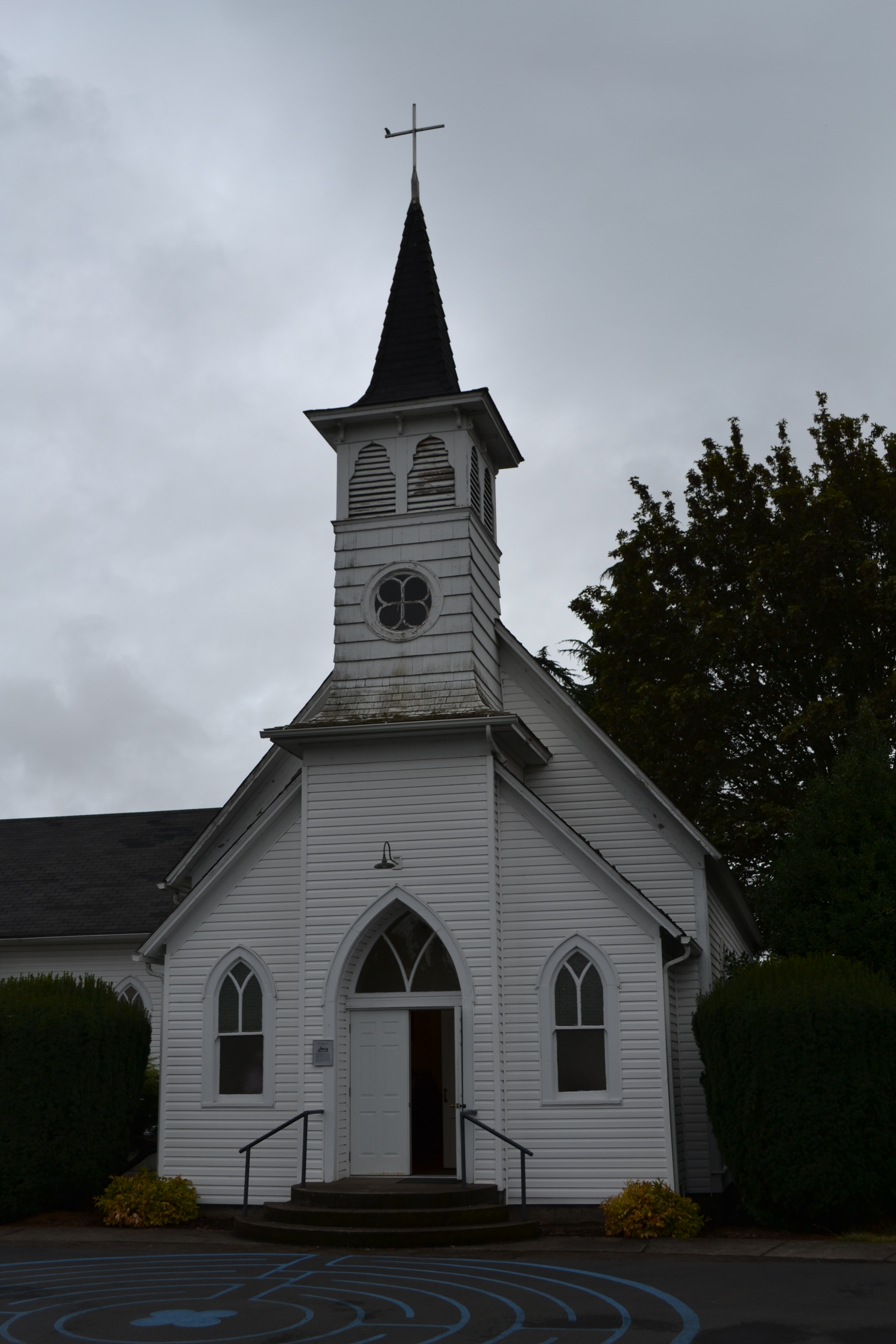
Faith Lutheran Church

Faith Lutheran Church is a Lutheran church located in Junction City in the U.S. state of Oregon. The church was founded in 1902, with the help of Anders Christian Nielsen, in the Danish United Evangelical Lutheran Church of America synod. The present building was completed in 1908. Church services were conducted in Danish until 1951, when the church language changed to English and the name changed to Faith Lutheran Church of Junction City.

The church was founded in order to promote the philosophy of N. F. S. Grundtvig, a Danish cleric who promoted Christian fundamentalism, Danish nationalism, and rural education. The church held lectures and other meetings, gymnastic competitions, and celebrations of Danish holidays. These activities helped to preserve the unique ethnic environment of Junction City.
