= Anders Nilsson (songwriter) =

Swedish songwriter, record producer and singer

- Born: Anders Nilsson; August 14, 1980 (age 45); Gällö, Sweden
- Genres: Pop, electronic
- Occupations: Songwriter, record producer, artist
- Years active: 2004 to present
- Website: andersnilsson.me

Anders Nilsson is a Swedish songwriter, record producer and singer. He is a former member of the Swedish R'n'B trio LDOD. He has written and co-written songs for artists like 5566, Sem Thomasson, Jelle Van Dael, Blänk, Sofi Bonde and Robin Bengtsson, as well as music for film and TV such as the Netflix series Greenhouse Academy.

In 2008 Nilsson participated in the talent show Hitmakers (TV series) on Swedish Channel 5.
