= Opphaug =

Village in Ørland Municipality, Norway

- Village
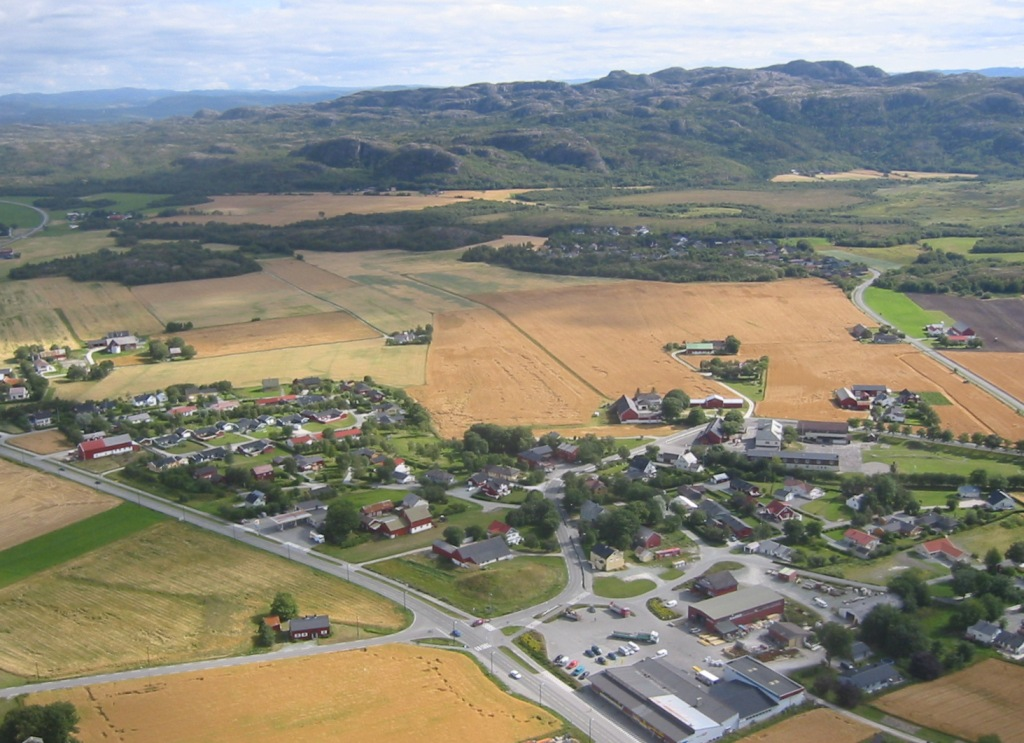
- View of the village
- Interactive map of Opphaug
- Location within Trøndelag Location within Norway
- Coordinates: 63.7273°N 09.6888°E
- Country: Norway
- Region: Central Norway
- County: Trøndelag
- District: Fosen
- Municipality: Ørland Municipality

Area
  - Total: 0.42 km^{2} (0.16 sq mi)
- Elevation: 12 m (39 ft)

Population (2024)
  - Total: 398
  - Density: 948/km^{2} (2,460/sq mi)
- Time zone: UTC+01:00 (CET)
  - Summer (DST): UTC+02:00 (CEST)
- Post Code: 7140 Opphaug

Opphaug is a village in Ørland Municipality in Trøndelag county, Norway. The village is located on the Ørlandet peninsula about 4 kilometres (2.5 mi) east of the village of Uthaug, 5 kilometres (3.1 mi) northwest of the villages of Ottarsbu and Austrått, and 5 kilometres (3.1 mi) northeast of the town of Brekstad.

The 0.42-square-kilometre (100-acre) village has a population (2024) of 398 and a population density of 948 inhabitants per square kilometre (2,460/sq mi). Opphaug has small-scale industry and a grain mill.

== Climate ==
Climate data for Ørland Main Air Station 1991–2020 (10 m, precipitation days 1961–90, extremes 1955–present)
Month	Jan	Feb	Mar	Apr	May	Jun	Jul	Aug	Sep	Oct	Nov	Dec	Year
Record high °C (°F)	12.4 (54.3)	10.9 (51.6)	14.3 (57.7)	22.6 (72.7)	28.9 (84.0)	30.7 (87.3)	32.7 (90.9)	31.8 (89.2)	25.9 (78.6)	19.6 (67.3)	14.2 (57.6)	12.2 (54.0)	32.7 (90.9)
Mean daily maximum °C (°F)	3.1 (37.6)	2.8 (37.0)	4.7 (40.5)	8.8 (47.8)	12.6 (54.7)	15.3 (59.5)	17.9 (64.2)	18 (64)	14.5 (58.1)	9.4 (48.9)	5.6 (42.1)	3.8 (38.8)	9.7 (49.4)
Daily mean °C (°F)	1.1 (34.0)	0.7 (33.3)	2.1 (35.8)	5.4 (41.7)	8.8 (47.8)	11.7 (53.1)	14 (57)	14.1 (57.4)	11.3 (52.3)	7 (45)	3.7 (38.7)	1.7 (35.1)	6.8 (44.3)
Mean daily minimum °C (°F)	−1.3 (29.7)	−1.7 (28.9)	−0.7 (30.7)	2.1 (35.8)	5.3 (41.5)	8.4 (47.1)	10.6 (51.1)	10.7 (51.3)	8.4 (47.1)	4.5 (40.1)	1.4 (34.5)	−0.7 (30.7)	3.9 (39.0)
Record low °C (°F)	−19.8 (−3.6)	−20.5 (−4.9)	−16.5 (2.3)	−8.6 (16.5)	−3.1 (26.4)	0.1 (32.2)	3.6 (38.5)	1 (34)	−3.3 (26.1)	−8 (18)	−15.4 (4.3)	−18 (0)	−20.5 (−4.9)
Average precipitation mm (inches)	88 (3.5)	82 (3.2)	76 (3.0)	55 (2.2)	52 (2.0)	69 (2.7)	63 (2.5)	91 (3.6)	110 (4.3)	104 (4.1)	92 (3.6)	111 (4.4)	993 (39.1)
Average precipitation days (≥ 1.0 mm)	16	15	15	11	10	12	11	13	14	15	14	16	162
Source 1:
Source 2:
