= Anders Nilsen Næsset =

Norwegian fisherman and politician

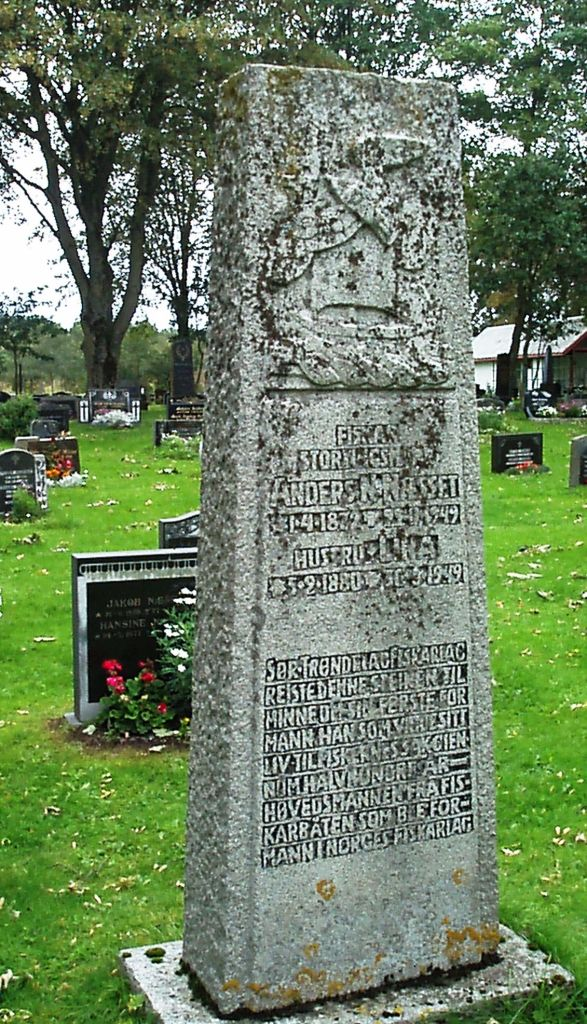
Tombstone erected by Norwegian Fishermen's Association on Anders Nilsen Næsset's grave in Ørland Cemetery, Norway

Anders Nilsen Næsset (1 April 1872 in Uthaug in Ørland Municipality, Norway – 1949) was a Norwegian fisherman, one of the founders of the Norwegian Fishermen's Association and from 1931 to 1933, a Member of Norwegian Parliament.

== Life ==
Næsset started as a fisherman at 16-year-old becoming a captain at 18. From 1892 to 1930 he fished herring. In 1898 he married Lina Marie Haftorsdatter. In addition he was a councilor from 1916 to 1940 and from 1945 to 1949. Very early on, he cofounded the Ørlands Fishermen Association in 1896 and was a co-founder of the Norwegian Fishermen's Association in 1926 becoming its deputy leader from time of establishment in 1926 until 1931 and its chairman from 1931 until 1937. He also held the position of president of the Sør-Trøndelag Fishermen's Association from 1922 to 1947. He received the King's Gold Medal of Merit for his services.

Part of the Norway Liberal Party (also known as Venstre, V, meaning "left"), he ran for Parliamentary elections becoming a Member of Norwegian Parliament from 1931 to 1933.

The Norwegian Fishermen's Association erected a pillar over his grave at Ørland Cemetery.
