= Sofi Bonde =

Swedish singer and songwriter

- Born: 17 November 1976 (age 49); Gothenburg, Sweden
- Occupations: singer, songwriter

Sofi Bonde, born 17 November 1976 in Gothenburg, Sweden, is a Swedish retro pop singer and songwriter.

Sofi was born in Gothenburg, before moving to Stockholm at the age of eight. She gravitated towards music early in her life, inspired by her father's interest in classical and dixie-land jazz piano.

At seventeen, Sofi left Stockholm to explore the world outside Sweden. She moved to Paris and began working on her first demo. While back in Sweden for a visit, a chance meeting with guitarist Micke Nord of Roxette resulted in a record deal and her debut release with Independent Records (Bonniers). It contained the singles "Back in Your Arms", "Hey Boy" produced by Steve Mac, and "Little Things" which was number 1 on Swedish national radio P4 for three months summer of 2000.

In 2006, Sofi released Fighting Gravity on Subatomic Records. It features the songs "Fallout" and "Thing For You", which have appeared on the MTV show The Hills, USA's "Covert Affairs" and "The Vampire Diaries".

Her music has been heard on many television and movie releases including MTV's "The Hills", "The City", CW's "Melrose Place", and feature film "When in Rome" starring Kristen Bell.

Sofi release "Angels Above" in June 2020 that became a radio favorit as well as "Home For Christmas". In 2021, Sofi released "On Fire" and "Inside Out".

== Discography ==
- One (2001)
- Fighting Gravity (2006)
- Heart Machine Service EP (2014)
- Angels Above (2020)
- Home For Christmas (2020)
- On Fire (2021)
- Inside Out (2021)

== Placements ==
- All Up To Me – Princess Diaries MTV trailer (2008)
- Defense – The Hills (2009)
- Fallout – The Hills (2007), Vampire Diaries (2009)
- Heart Bling – When in Rome, Tough Love (2009), The Hills (2009), NBC's The Chase, The Beautiful Life (2009)
- LA – Melrose Place (2009)
- Never Give Up – The City, The Hills, ABC's promos for Secret Millionaire
- Nobody – The Hills (2009)
- Nothing's Wrong – The City (2009)
- Out Of Space – What Chilli Wants, The Hills (2008)
- Pick Me Up – The Hills (2009)
- Questions – The City (2009)
- Shade Of Grey – Fly Girls, The City(2009)
- See Through – More To Love (8/11 and 9/8/09), Legendary (2009), The City (2009)
- Slowly – Melrose Place (2009), The Hills (2008)
- Sweet Love Honey – Celebrity Circus (2008)
- Shadows – Paranormal State (2008)
- Thing for You – Newport Harbor (2008)
- Win Some Day – "Entourage" (12/2010), 90210 (2010)

She signed a record deal with Atlantic Records in Los Angeles and had her songs licensed to Hollywood movies and TV-series such as Entourage, Gossip Girl, The Vampire Diaries, Beverly Hills 90210 and Melrose Place.

Sofi Bonde recorded her first demo in Paris, and shortly after signed her recording agreement with Independent Records/Bonniers in Stockholm. 2001 her debut album "One" was released. Legendary songwriter Steve Mac (One Direction, Leona Lewis, Westlife, Il Divo) produced the tracks "Back in your arms" and "Hey boy". The rest of the album including the first single "Little things" was produced by Martin Hansen and Micke Nord and topped the charts at Swedish Radio P4 during the summer of 2001.

After the release of the album Sofi got a publishing deal offer and moved to London to develop as a songwriter. She got to travel to USA to collaborate with American songwriters. 2003 she moved to New York to explore a new step in her music career. 2006 her second album "Fighting Gravity" was released.

The new songs gained attention in Los Angeles and she was offered to collaborate with MTV to make her own reality series called "Make it in America". As it turned out things are rarely as they seem and the collaboration turned into Sofi writing and recording songs for their shows instead such as The Hills, The City and Newport Harbor. Much better! Sofi's licensing successes lead to the recording deal with Atlantic Records. Together with them the placements got bigger and bigger and ended up on shows such as "Entourage", "Gossip Girl", "The Vampire Diaries", "Beverly Hills 90210", "Melrose Place" and she scored the end title song "When in Rome" with the single "Heartbling".

Even though she was the most aired Swedish artist for a few months on American television, she returned to Sweden to be close to her mother who was sick. In 2020, Sofi decided to restart her music career as an artist and chose Retro Pop Rock as her music style. She collaborates with many musicians around the globe and releases her new songs continuously on all digital platforms.
