= Faith Lutheran Church (Quincy, Massachusetts) =

Historic church in Massachusetts, United States

- Salem Lutheran Church
- U.S. National Register of Historic Places
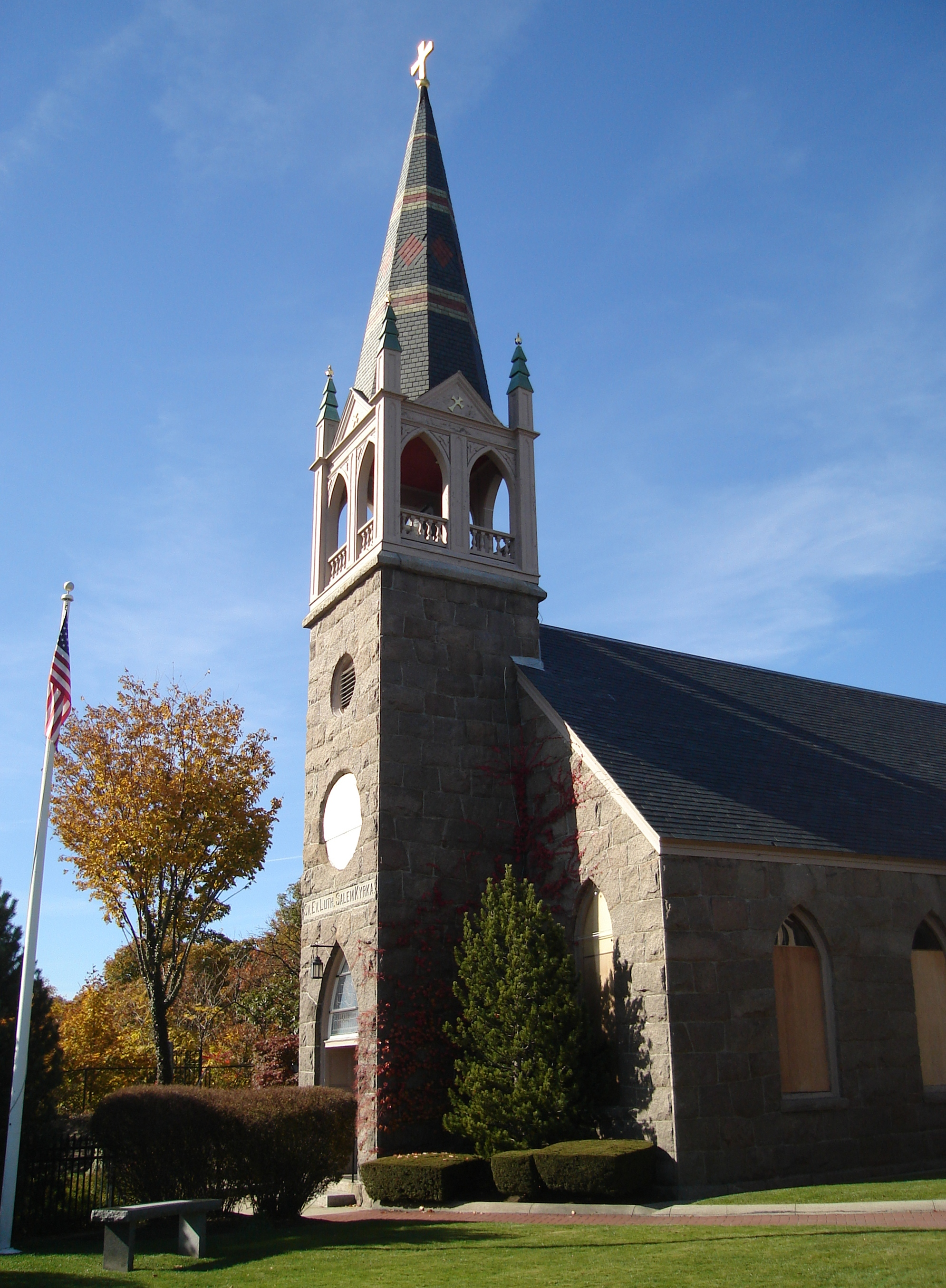

- Location within Massachusetts Location within the United States
- Location: 199 Granite St., Quincy, Massachusetts
- Coordinates: 42°14′41.01″N 71°0′30.76″W
- Built: 1892
- Architectural style: Late Gothic Revival
- MPS: Quincy MRA
- NRHP reference No.: 89001341
- Added to NRHP: September 20, 1989

Faith Lutheran Church, formerly known as Salem Lutheran Church, is a historic church at 199 Granite Street in Quincy, Massachusetts. The church was built in 1894 to serve a growing congregation of Scandinavians who had come to Quincy to work in its granite quarries. The stones for this granite Gothic Revival church building were hauled and dressed by members of the congregation. Its only major modification since its construction has been the addition of a chapel in 1914.

The building was listed on the National Register of Historic Places in 1989.

== See also ==
- National Register of Historic Places listings in Quincy, Massachusetts
