= Uthaug =

Village in Ørland Municipality, Norway

- Village
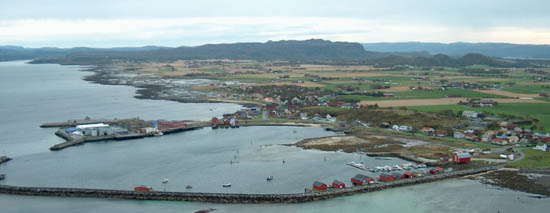
- View of the village
- Interactive map of Uthaug
- Location within Trøndelag Location within Norway
- Coordinates: 63.7263°N 09.5928°E
- Country: Norway
- Region: Central Norway
- County: Trøndelag
- District: Fosen
- Municipality: Ørland Municipality

Area
  - Total: 0.31 km^{2} (0.12 sq mi)
- Elevation: 2 m (6.6 ft)

Population (2024)
  - Total: 349
  - Density: 1,126/km^{2} (2,920/sq mi)
- Time zone: UTC+01:00 (CET)
  - Summer (DST): UTC+02:00 (CEST)
- Post Code: 7142 Uthaug

Uthaug is a village in Ørland Municipality in Trøndelag county, Norway. It is located on the south shore of the Bjugnfjorden about 4 kilometres (2.5 mi) west of the village of Opphaug, about 5 kilometres (3.1 mi) north of the town of Brekstad, and about 3 kilometres (1.9 mi) east of the Kjeungskjær Lighthouse. Ørland Airport lies just south of the village.

The 0.31-square-kilometre (77-acre) village has a population (2024) of 349 and a population density of 1,126 inhabitants per square kilometre (2,920/sq mi).

Uthaug is home to fish processing and concrete manufacturing industries. It also has a good harbor with a breakwater. The Uthaugsgården museum is an old preserved trading post that is located in the village.

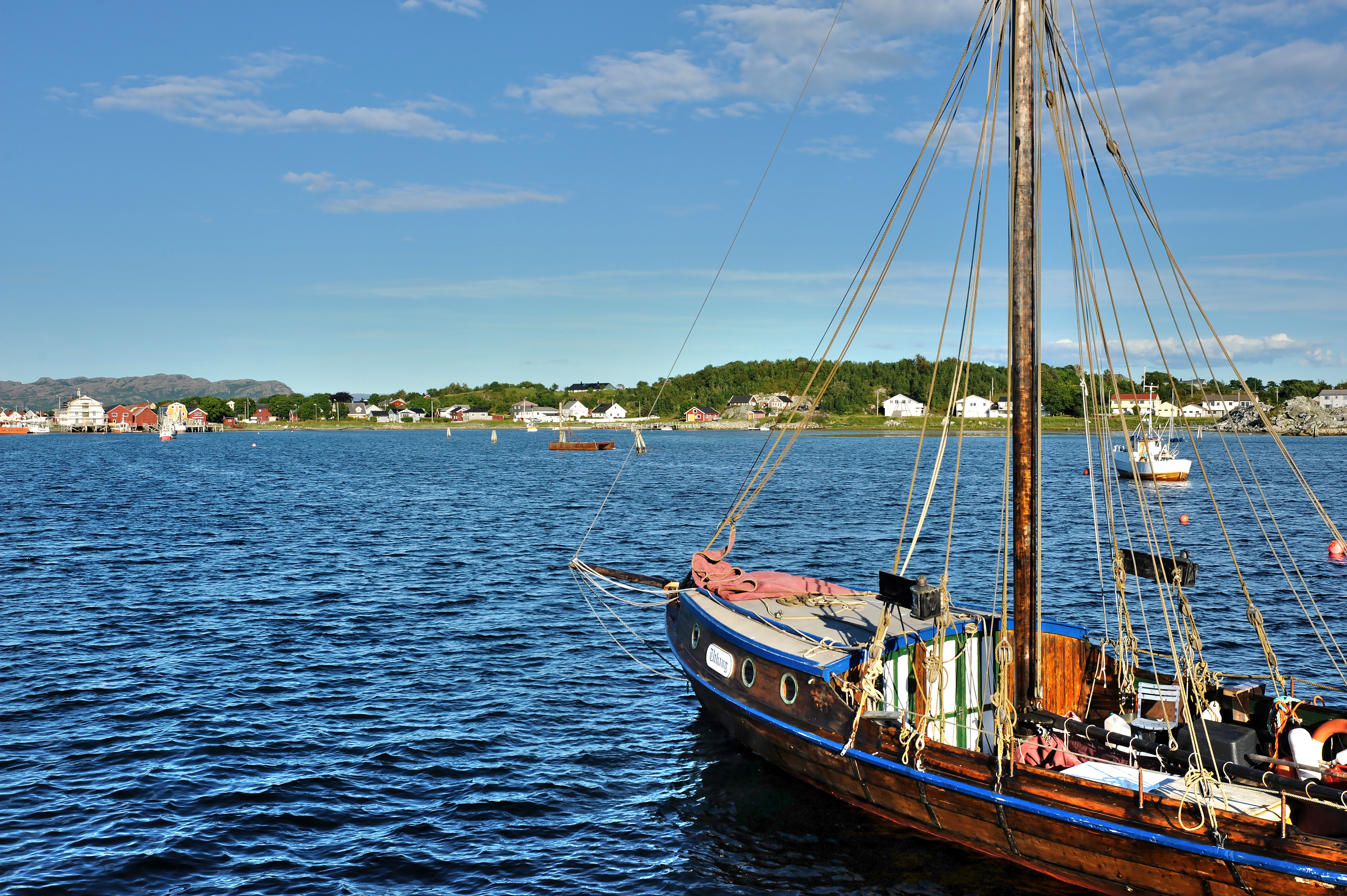
Uthaug harbour

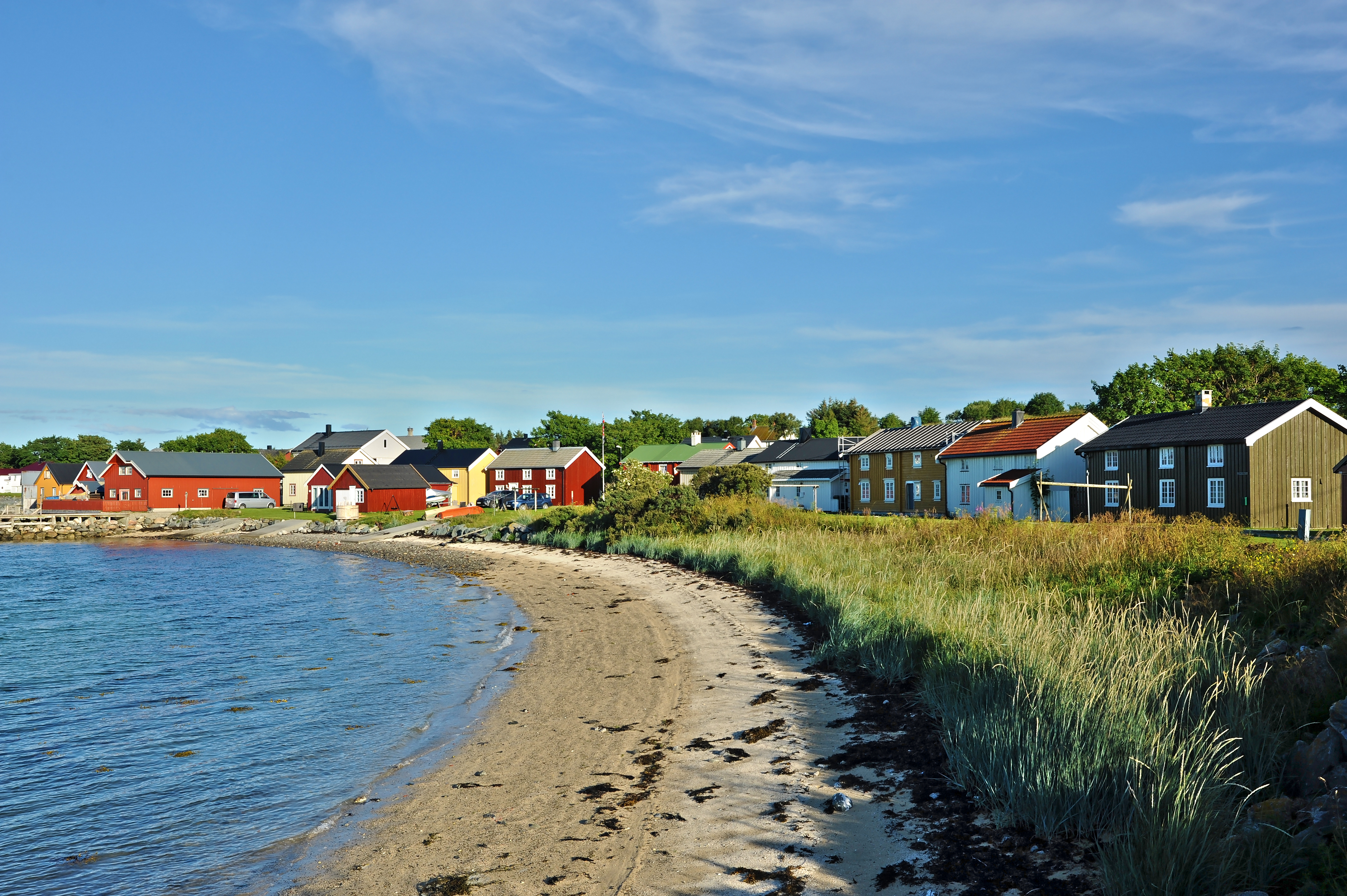
Sjøgata, Uthaugsgården

== Climate ==
Climate data for Ørland Main Air Station 1991–2020 (10 m, precipitation days 1961–90, extremes 1955–present)
Month	Jan	Feb	Mar	Apr	May	Jun	Jul	Aug	Sep	Oct	Nov	Dec	Year
Record high °C (°F)	12.4 (54.3)	10.9 (51.6)	14.3 (57.7)	22.6 (72.7)	28.9 (84.0)	30.7 (87.3)	32.7 (90.9)	31.8 (89.2)	25.9 (78.6)	19.6 (67.3)	14.2 (57.6)	12.2 (54.0)	32.7 (90.9)
Mean daily maximum °C (°F)	3.1 (37.6)	2.8 (37.0)	4.7 (40.5)	8.8 (47.8)	12.6 (54.7)	15.3 (59.5)	17.9 (64.2)	18 (64)	14.5 (58.1)	9.4 (48.9)	5.6 (42.1)	3.8 (38.8)	9.7 (49.4)
Daily mean °C (°F)	1.1 (34.0)	0.7 (33.3)	2.1 (35.8)	5.4 (41.7)	8.8 (47.8)	11.7 (53.1)	14 (57)	14.1 (57.4)	11.3 (52.3)	7 (45)	3.7 (38.7)	1.7 (35.1)	6.8 (44.3)
Mean daily minimum °C (°F)	−1.3 (29.7)	−1.7 (28.9)	−0.7 (30.7)	2.1 (35.8)	5.3 (41.5)	8.4 (47.1)	10.6 (51.1)	10.7 (51.3)	8.4 (47.1)	4.5 (40.1)	1.4 (34.5)	−0.7 (30.7)	3.9 (39.0)
Record low °C (°F)	−19.8 (−3.6)	−20.5 (−4.9)	−16.5 (2.3)	−8.6 (16.5)	−3.1 (26.4)	0.1 (32.2)	3.6 (38.5)	1 (34)	−3.3 (26.1)	−8 (18)	−15.4 (4.3)	−18 (0)	−20.5 (−4.9)
Average precipitation mm (inches)	88 (3.5)	82 (3.2)	76 (3.0)	55 (2.2)	52 (2.0)	69 (2.7)	63 (2.5)	91 (3.6)	110 (4.3)	104 (4.1)	92 (3.6)	111 (4.4)	993 (39.1)
Average precipitation days (≥ 1.0 mm)	16	15	15	11	10	12	11	13	14	15	14	16	162
Source 1:
Source 2:
