= Scandinavian Festival =

Cultural festival in Junction City, Oregon

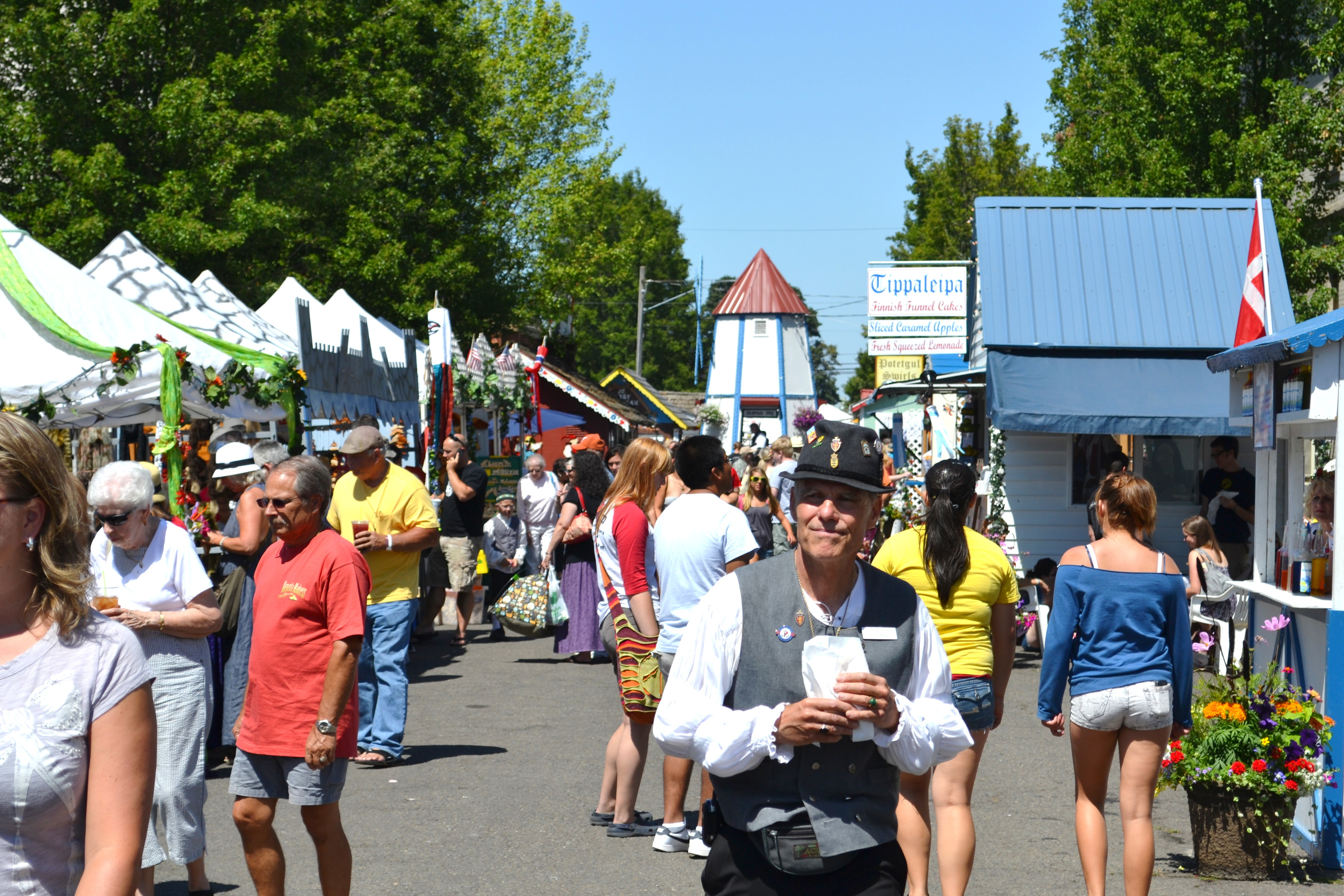
Finnish Day at the Scandinavian Festival

The Scandinavian Festival is an annual four-day celebration of Scandinavian heritage in Junction City, Oregon, United States. The small city of 6,052 people hosts more than 100,000 visitors each year. In 2008, Sunset Magazine rated it one of the best in the U.S. for its emphasis on authenticity. The Oregon Heritage Tradition designation was awarded to the Scandinavian Festival in 2014.

== History ==
The festival was started in 1961 by Dr. Gale Fletchall as a way to save a dying town. Downtown businesses were closing up, as the new Interstate 5 bypassed Junction City, diverting most of the traffic going through town on Oregon Route 99. It was then that Fletchall began searching for a rallying point for community spirit. He thought a citywide celebration would be ideal, but he was stumped for a theme. He considered and discarded several possibilities before settling on the most obvious, a celebration of the city's very real but very dormant Scandinavian heritage. He talked the idea over with older Danish-American residents, and then secured financial backing from the chamber of commerce in May 1961. The first community classes in Scandinavian dancing and singing were organized a few weeks later, and church and civic organizations were persuaded to operate food and craft booths. In August 1961 the first annual Scandinavian Festival opened in temporary booths in downtown Junction City. Fletchall expected perhaps 2,000 visitors; he got 25,000.

== Activities ==
Since 1961, the city has attracted visitors nationally to the downtown area, which is transformed into an old world town for the occasion. Each day of the festival highlights a particular Scandinavian country—Denmark, Sweden, Finland, and Norway.

Costumed Vikings march down the street, authentic northern European puppet shows are traditionally themed, and colorful costumes are displayed in a fashion show. Storytellers and actors highlight Hans Christian Andersen stories, folk dancers perform and instruct, and choral and instrumental groups perform traditional pieces. There are also language classes and the Scandia Run 10 km.

Traditional Scandinavian food includes vandbakkelser (chocolate dipped yum puffs), Æbleskiver, Swedish meatballs and Lefse.
