= Junction City High School (Oregon) =

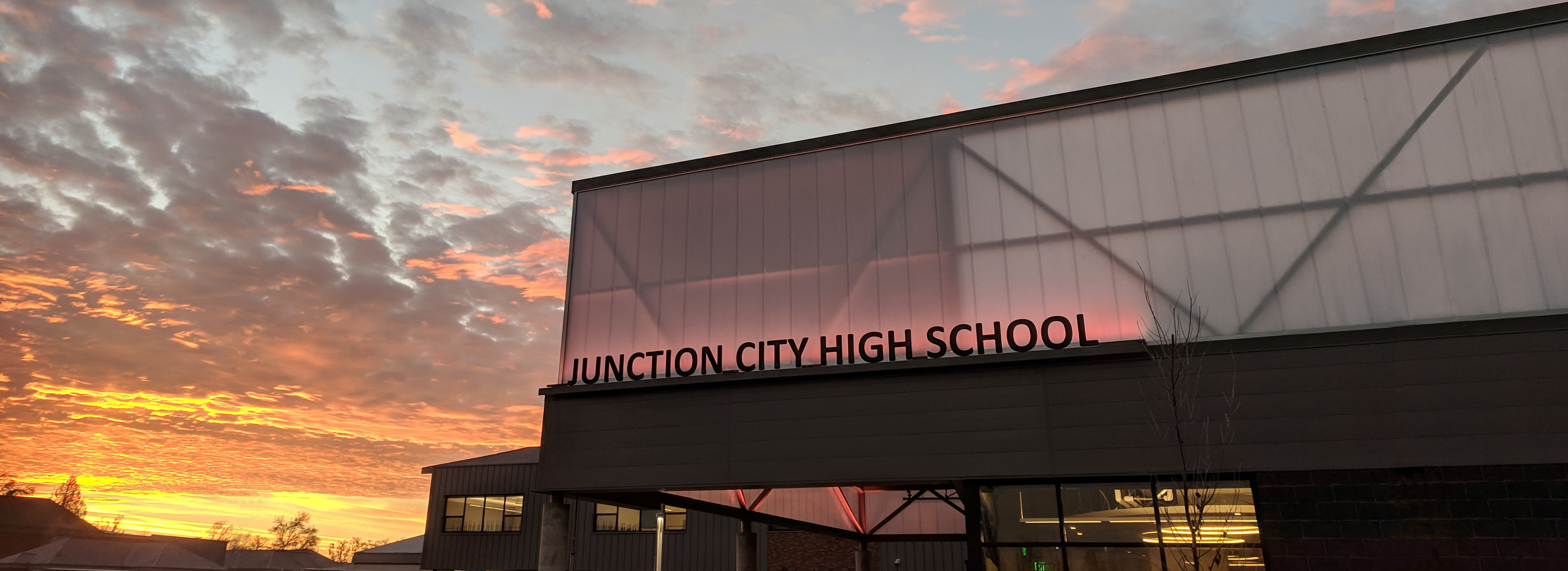

Location
- 1135 West 6th Avenue; Junction City, (Lane County), Oregon 97448; United States; 44°13′05″N 123°12′43″W

Information
- School type: Public High School
- School district: Junction City School District
- Principal: Bryce Bennett
- Staff: 31.51 (FTE)
- Grades: 9-12
- Enrollment: 517 (2023-2024)
- Student to teacher ratio: 16.41
- Colors: Maroon and gold
- Athletics conference: OSAA Sky-Em League 4A-5
- Mascot: Tiger
- Team name: Junction City Tigers
- Rivals: Marist Catholic High School Spartans Cottage Grove Lions
- Newspaper: Maroon and Gold
- Website: www.jchigh.org

Junction City High School is a public high school in Junction City, Oregon, United States.

== Academics ==
In 2008, 88% of the school's seniors received a high school diploma.

== Notable alumni ==
- Josh Wilcox - NFL tight end
- Justin Wilcox - football head coach, University of California, Berkeley
