= Junction City, Oregon =

- City
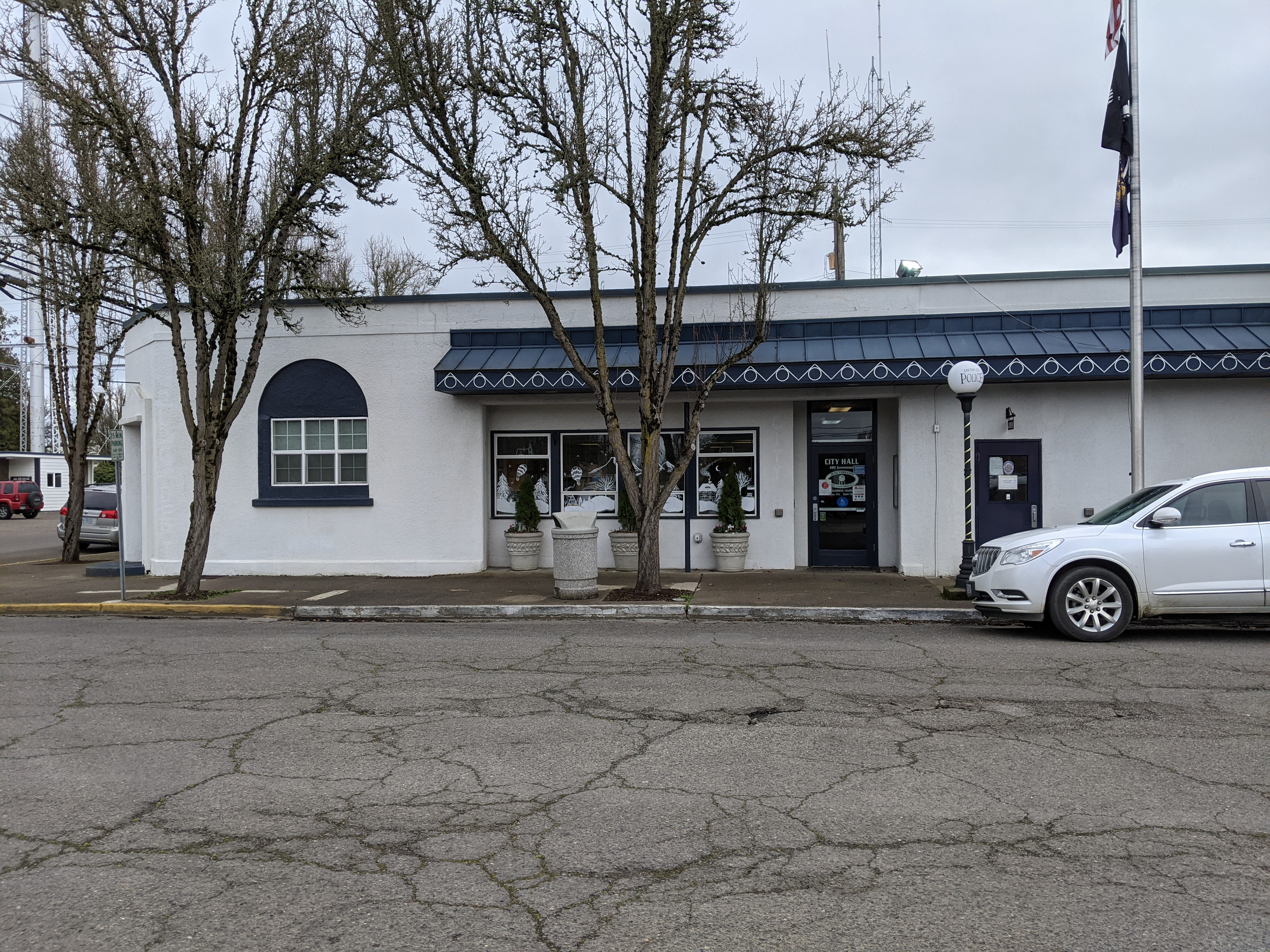
- City Hall

- Location in Oregon
- Coordinates: 44°13′24″N 123°13′36″W
- Country: United States
- State: Oregon
- County: Lane
- Incorporated: 1872

Government
  - Type: Council-Manager

Area
  - Total: 3.30 sq mi (8.54 km^{2})
  - Land: 3.30 sq mi (8.54 km^{2})
  - Water: 0 sq mi (0.00 km^{2})
- Elevation: 322 ft (98 m)

Population (2020)
  - Total: 6,787
  - Density: 2,058.4/sq mi (794.77/km^{2})
- Time zone: UTC−08:00 (Pacific)
  - Summer (DST): UTC−07:00 (Pacific)
- ZIP Code: 97448
- Area code: 541
- FIPS code: 41-38000
- GNIS feature ID: 2410157
- Website: www.junctioncityoregon.gov

Junction City is a city in Lane County, Oregon, United States. As of the 2020 United States census, it has a population of 6,747.

The Junction City area is notable for its Scandinavian heritage, with the city's Scandinavian Festival attracting over 100,000 visitors annually. Junction City was previously a center of recreational vehicle manufacturing.

== History ==
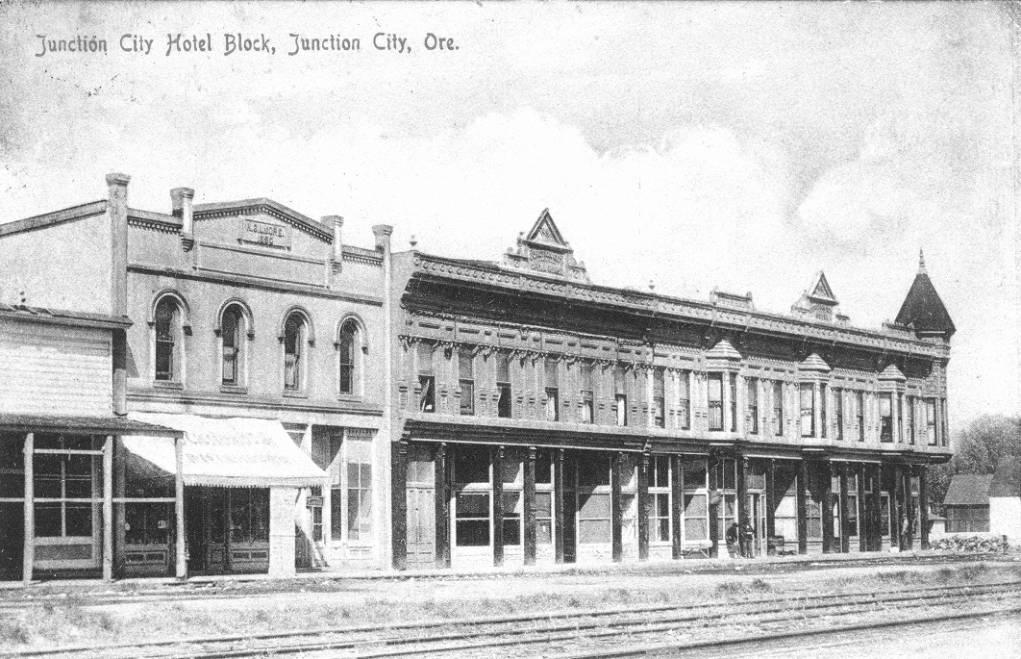
Junction City hotel block in 1908

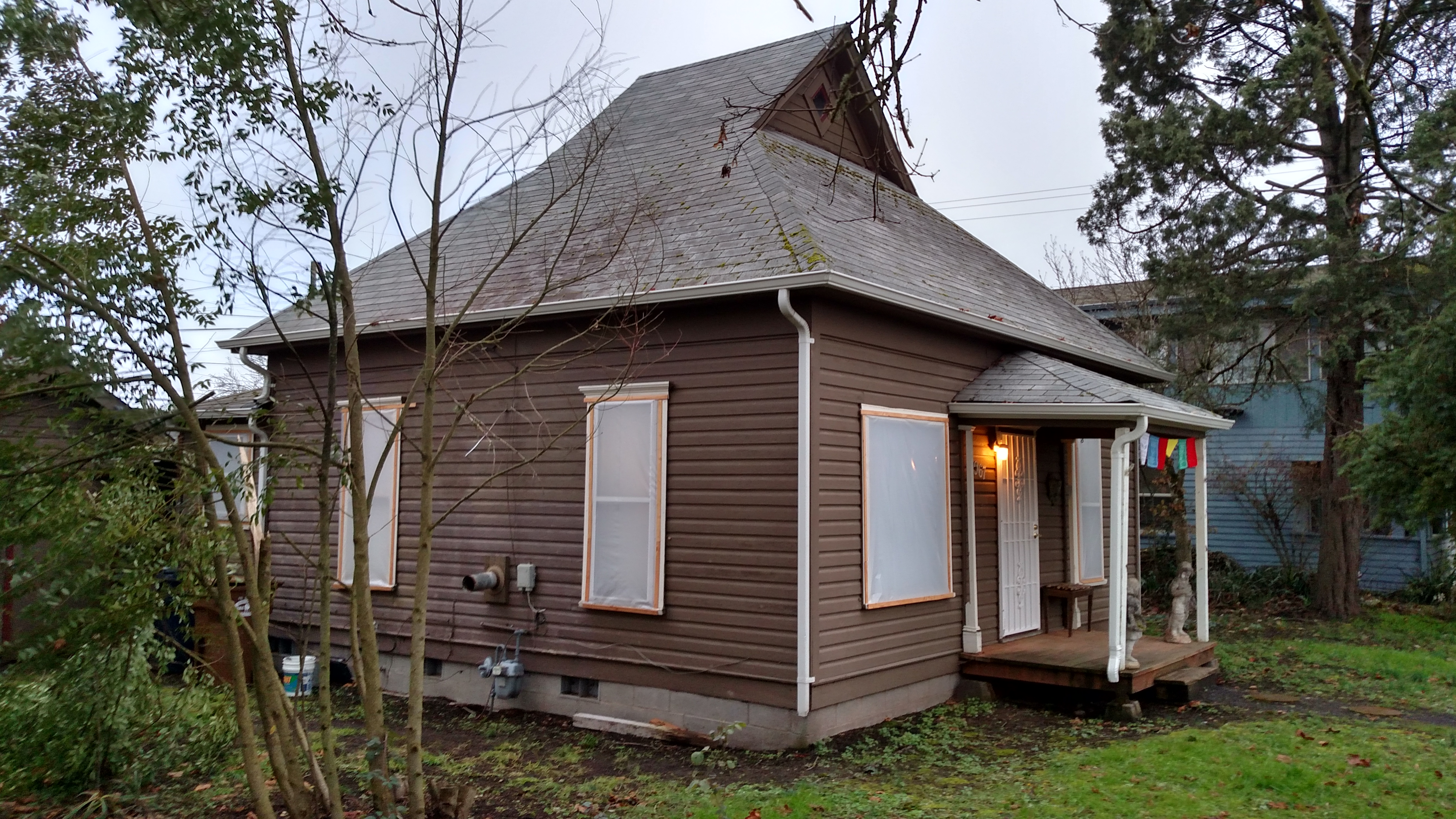
Original, c. 1902 Danish-American farmhouse in Junction City

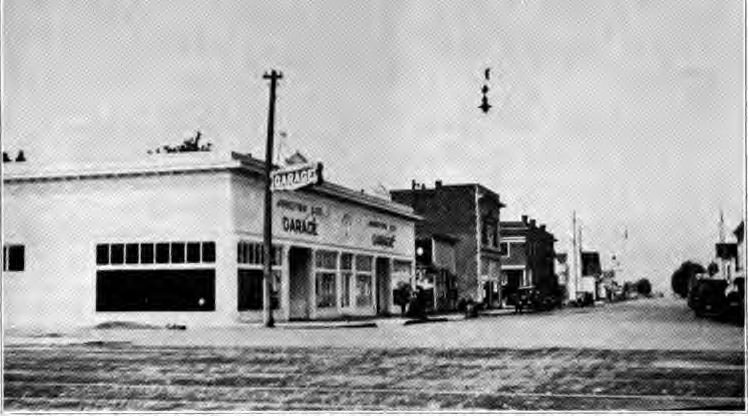
Junction City, c. 1920

The city was incorporated in 1872. Junction City was named by railroad magnate Ben Holladay, who decided that it would be where the rail line on the east side of the Willamette Valley would meet the rail line on the west side. The westside line, however, was not built according to plan and the rail junction never materialized. Junction City later became the meeting point of the east and west branches of U.S. Route 99 (which divide in Portland).

In 1902, real estate developer A.C. Nielsen subdivided 1,600 acres of farmland near Junction City into small farms and advertised them in a Danish-language newspaper in Iowa. Many families of Danish ancestry subsequently settled in the area. Danish was spoken regularly in the area until the 1940s, with Lutheran Church services offered in Danish until 1951. In 1961, residents of Junction City founded the Scandinavian Festival, an annual event that remains popular to this day, to celebrate the legacy of these and other Scandinavian immigrants to the Junction City area.

In the early 1990s, Junction City voters considered two ballot initiatives aimed at restricting LGBT civil rights. The initiatives sought to ban the city government from enforcing civil rights protections based on sexual orientation and prohibited public money from being spent to "promote" homosexuality. The first ballot initiative was narrowly passed by voters on June 29, 1993, by a vote of 631 to 628 (50.12% in favor). The election was subsequently invalidated due to evidence of voter fraud by supporters. Litigation led by the ACLU of Oregon showed that a Junction City church had allowed several members of their congregation who did not live in Junction City to fraudulently register to vote in Junction City by claiming the church was their residential address. A similar initiative was placed before voters again in March 1994 and passed with a larger margin. In 1995, all Anti-LBGT local ordinances in Oregon were invalidated when the Oregon Supreme Court upheld House Bill 3500.

From 2003 to 2005, a group of local farmers posed for nude calendars to raise money for the Junction City School District. Sales in over 63 countries raised more than $650,000.

== Geography ==
According to the United States Census Bureau, the city has a total area of 2.36 square miles (6.11 km^{2}), all of it land.

=== Climate ===
This region experiences warm (but not hot) and dry summers, with no average monthly temperatures above 71.6 °F (22 °C). According to the Köppen Climate Classification system, Junction City has a warm-summer Mediterranean climate, abbreviated "Csb" on climate maps.

== Demographics ==
Historical population
Census	Pop.	Note	%±
1880	428		—
1900	506		—
1910	759		50.0%
1920	687		−9.5%
1930	922		34.2%
1940	1,187		28.7%
1950	1,475		24.3%
1960	1,614		9.4%
1970	2,373		47.0%
1980	3,320		39.9%
1990	3,670		10.5%
2000	5,132		39.8%
2010	5,392		5.1%
2020	6,787		25.9%
U.S. Decennial Census

=== 2020 census ===
As of the 2020 census, Junction City had a population of 6,787, a population density of 2,065 inhabitants per square mile (797.3/km^{2}), and 2,704 housing units at an occupancy rate of 96.2%.

The median age was 37.8 years. 24.6% of residents were under the age of 18 and 17.1% of residents were 65 years of age or older. For every 100 females there were 97.5 males, and for every 100 females age 18 and over there were 94.6 males age 18 and over.

There were 2,601 households in Junction City, of which 33.8% had children under the age of 18 living in them. Of all households, 47.6% were married-couple households, 16.4% were households with a male householder and no spouse or partner present, and 27.3% were households with a female householder and no spouse or partner present. About 26.3% of all households were made up of individuals and 13.6% had someone living alone who was 65 years of age or older. There were 2,704 housing units, of which 3.8% were vacant; among occupied housing units, 59.9% were owner-occupied and 40.1% were renter-occupied. The homeowner vacancy rate was 0.8% and the rental vacancy rate was 4.3%.

94.4% of residents lived in urban areas, while 5.6% lived in rural areas.

Racial composition as of the 2020 census
Race	Number	Percent
White	5,671	83.6%
Black or African American	58	0.9%
American Indian and Alaska Native	102	1.5%
Asian	81	1.2%
Native Hawaiian and Other Pacific Islander	12	0.2%
Some other race	267	3.9%
Two or more races	596	8.8%
Hispanic or Latino (of any race)	673	9.9%

=== 2010 census ===
As of the census of 2010, there were 5,392 people, 2,184 households, and 1,394 families living in the city. The population density was 2,284.7 inhabitants per square mile (882.1/km^{2}). There were 2,323 housing units at an average density of 984.3 per square mile (380.0/km^{2}). The racial makeup of the city was 90.4% White, 0.7% African American, 1.3% Native American, 0.6% Asian, 0.1% Pacific Islander, 3.7% from other races, and 3.2% from two or more races. Hispanic or Latino of any race were 9.0% of the population.

There were 2,184 households, of which 33.3% had children under the age of 18 living with them, 45.0% were married couples living together, 13.0% had a female householder with no husband present, 5.8% had a male householder with no wife present, and 36.2% were non-families. 28.4% of all households were made up of individuals, and 13.8% had someone living alone who was 65 years of age or older. The average household size was 2.43 and the average family size was 2.93.

The median age in the city was 36 years. 25% of residents were under the age of 18; 9.1% were between the ages of 18 and 24; 26.4% were from 25 to 44; 24.4% were from 45 to 64; and 15.1% were 65 years of age or older. The gender makeup of the city was 47.8% male and 52.2% female.

=== 2000 census ===
As of the census of 2000, there were 4,721 people, 1,823 households, and 1,170 families living in the city. The population density was 3,405.1 inhabitants per square mile (1,314.7/km^{2}). There were 1,921 housing units at an average density of 1,385.5 per square mile (534.9/km^{2}). The racial makeup of the city was 91.21% White, 0.30% African American, 1.23% Native American, 0.59% Asian, 0.04% Pacific Islander, 3.66% from other races, and 2.97% from two or more races. Hispanic or Latino of any race were 8.28% of the population. There were 1,823 households, out of which 34.4% had children under the age of 18 living with them, 50.5% were married couples living together, 10.1% had a female householder with no husband present, and 35.8% were non-families. 30.5% of all households were made up of individuals, and 16.5% had someone living alone who was 65 years of age or older. The average household size was 2.51 and the average family size was 3.15.

In the city, the population was 27.1% under the age of 18, 10.5% from 18 to 24, 27.9% from 25 to 44, 19.6% from 45 to 64, and 14.9% who were 65 years of age or older. The median age was 34 years. For every 100 females, there were 92.1 males. For every 100 females age 18 and over, there were 88.5 males.

The median income for a household in the city was $35,347, and the median income for a family was $43,875. Males had a median income of $31,044 versus $21,757 for females. The per capita income for the city was $16,155. About 6.3% of families and 8.8% of the population were below the poverty line, including 11.7% of those under age 18 and 14.5% of those age 65 or over.

== Economy ==
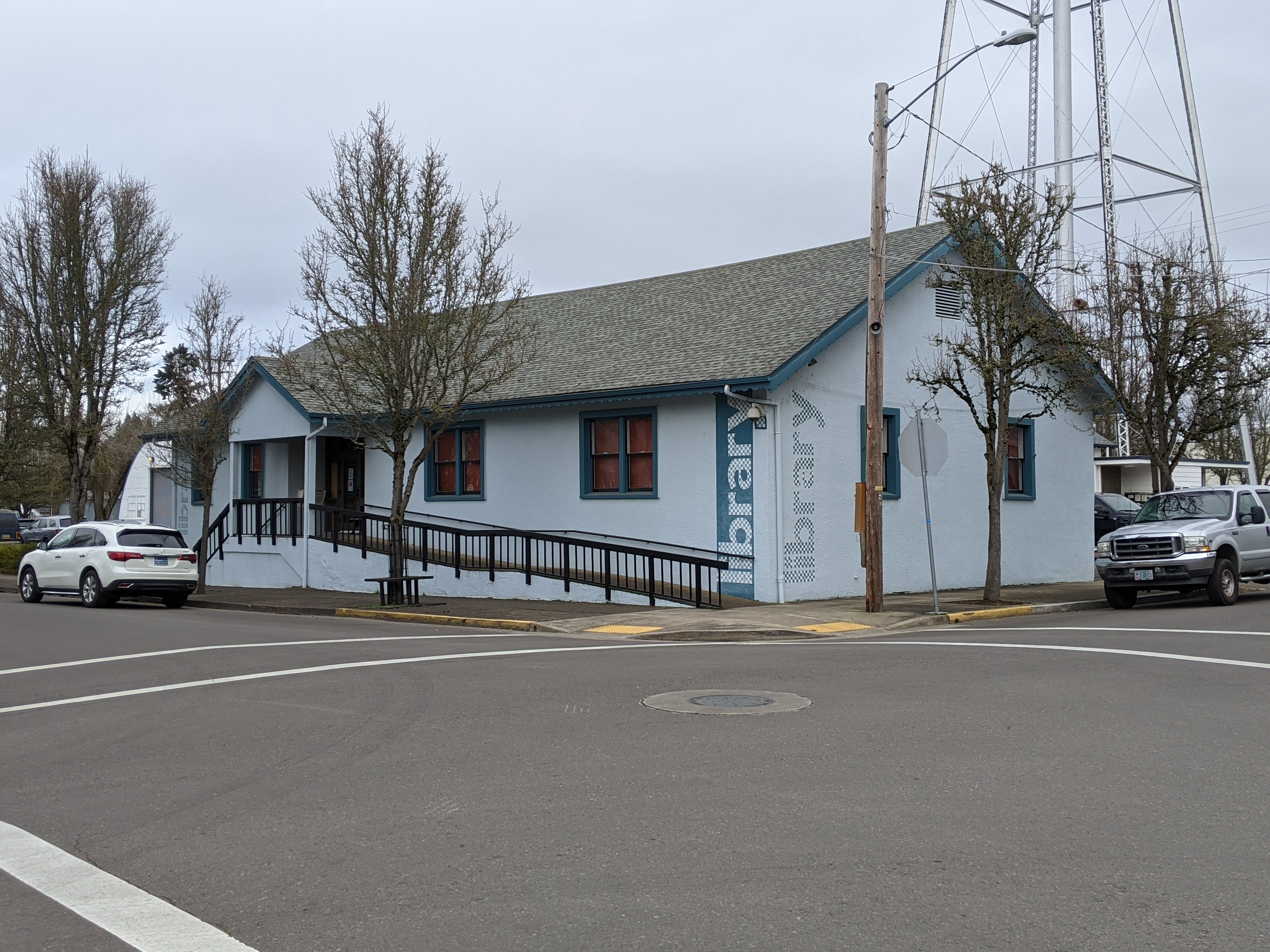
Junction City municipal library

Junction City is located in the bottom of the Willamette Valley, close to the Willamette River, an extremely fertile agricultural region. Hazelnuts, hay, grass seed, nursery crops, Christmas trees, sheep, and dairy products are the major agricultural products of the area. Junction City is also located in a growing wine region. The Lower Long Tom American Viticulture Area (AVA), establish in 2021, is located primarily in the Junction City area.

Junction City is home to a number of prominent agricultural businesses. Lochmead Farms, a dairy headquartered in the city, was awarded the top dark chocolate ice cream and the second-best vanilla ice cream at the 2018 World Dairy Expo in Wisconsin. Lochmead Farms operates a chain of 44 Dari Mart convenience stores throughout the south Willamette Valley. The Eugene Livestock Auction, the largest in western Oregon, is also located in Junction City.

Junction City was a center of the RV and motorcoach manufacturing in the 20th Century, with the nickname "The RV Manufacturing Capital of the World." The city was the home of Country Coach, a large luxury motorcoach manufacturer employing over 2,000 people. Country Coach was liquidated in February 2010 after filing for bankruptcy. It was also the home of Monaco Coach Corporation and Marathon Coach prior to their move to nearby Coburg. Similarly, Guaranty RV Super Center of Junction City was the largest RV dealership in the U.S. No RV or motorhome manufacturers remain in Junction City following the Great Recession.

In March 2015, the Oregon State Hospital opened a Junction City campus with the capacity to serve up to 174 people with severe mental illness.

== Arts and culture ==
=== Annual events ===
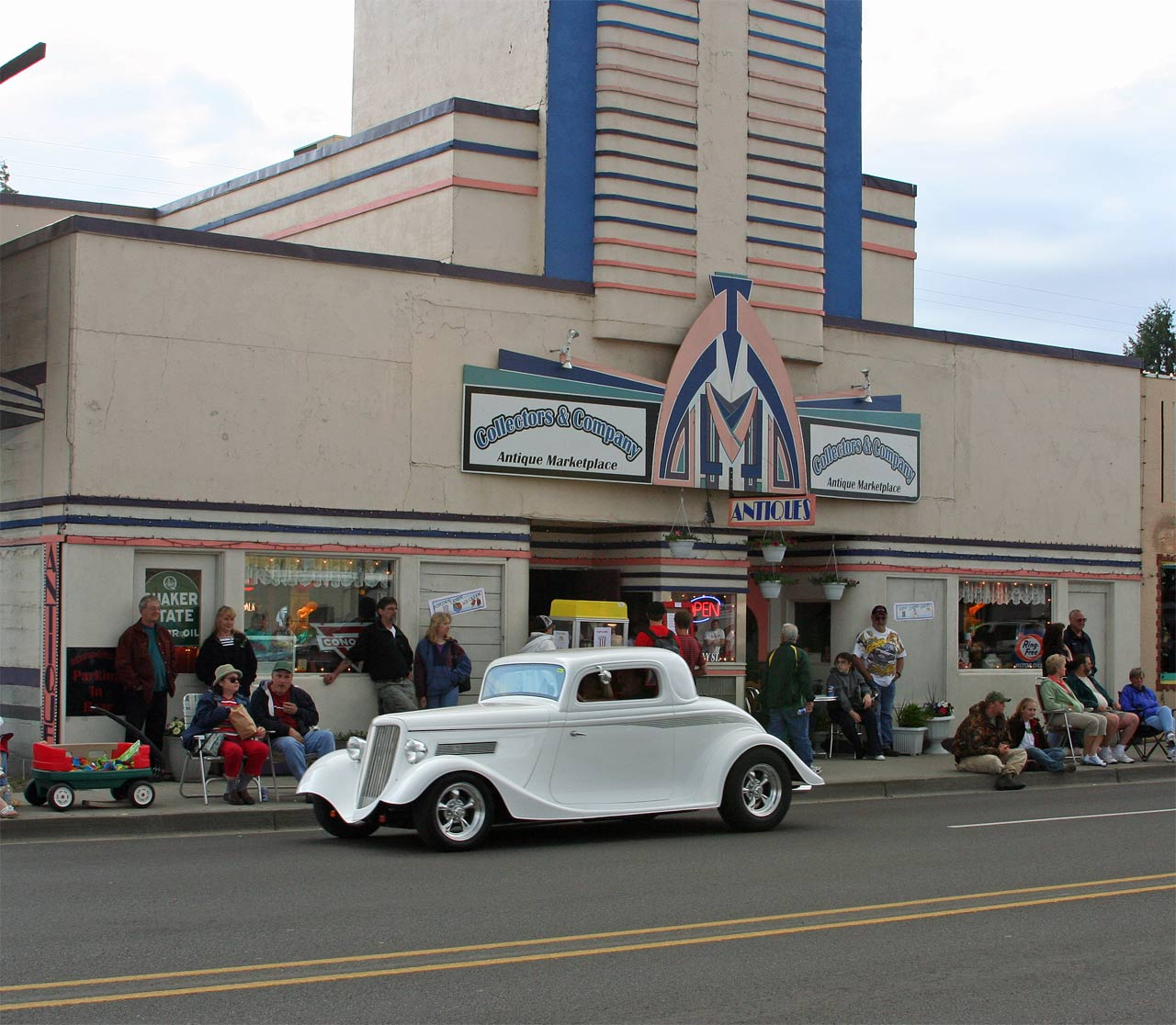
"Function 4 Junction" cruise in Junction City

- The Scandinavian Festival occurs annually in mid-August and features traditional Scandinavian costumes, crafts, and folk dance.
- The Daffodil Drive Festival is a two-day event held annually in mid-March, featuring a 6-mile (9.7 km) driving route heavily planted with daffodils extending from Junction City to the Long Tom Grange Hall.
- The "Function 4 Junction" is a two-day classic car show and cruise held annually in June.
- The Highway 36 "52-Mile Yard Sale" is a three-day event held annually in late June in which many yard sales are held along the 52-mile length of Oregon Route 36, which extends from Junction City to Mapleton in the Oregon Coast Range. Founded in 2004, the event is patterned after the 127 Corridor Sale in the Tennessee area.

== Education ==
The city is served by Junction City School District No. 69, which includes Junction City High School. Junction City is also located in the Lane Community College District.

== Notable people ==
- James A. Bushnell, first chairman of the board of Bushnell University
- Charity Dean, disease control expert and assistant director of California's Department of Public Health
- Bobby Doerr, Major League Baseball player, member of National Baseball Hall of Fame and Museum
- Kate Elliott, fantasy and science fiction writer
- Ty Harden, Major League Soccer player
- Eric Hays, basketball player and coach
- Derek Humphry, founder of the Hemlock Society
- Buster B. Jones, American fingerpicking-style guitar player
- Walter McClure, track and field athlete
- Dmae Roberts, public radio producer, writer, actress, and playwright
- Dave Wilcox, American football player, member of Pro Football Hall of Fame
- Justin Wilcox, American football coach
- John N. Williamson, politician
