= Løvøy Church =

Church in Trøndelag, Norway

- Løvøy kirke / Nord-Flatanger kirke
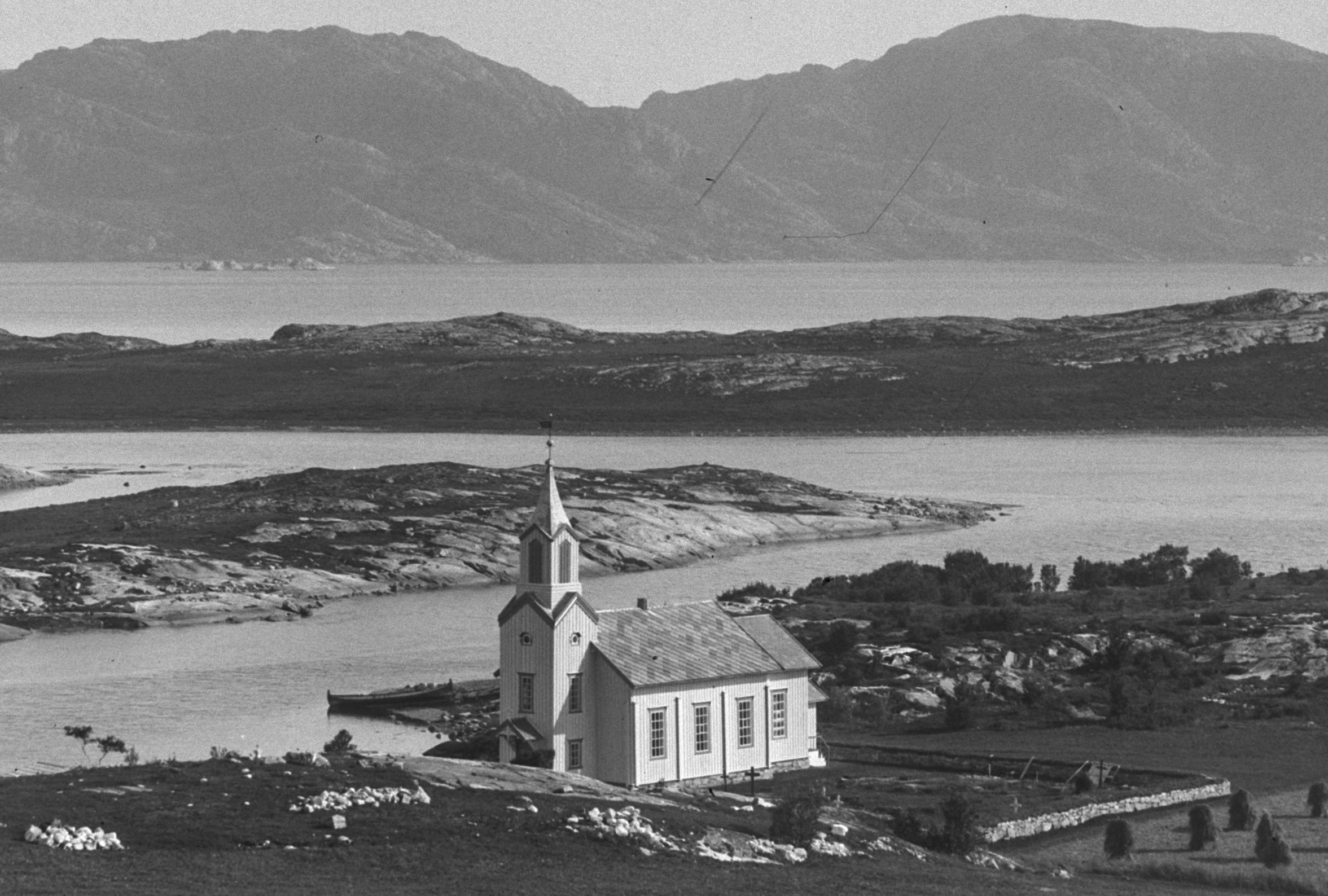
- View of the church
- Løvøy Church
- 64.512651526°N 10.88324546°E
- Location: Flatanger Municipality, Trøndelag
- Country: Norway
- Denomination: Church of Norway
- Churchmanship: Evangelical Lutheran

History
- Status: Parish church
- Founded: 1872
- Consecrated: 2 August 1872

Architecture
- Functional status: Active
- Architect: Jakobsen
- Architectural type: Long church
- Completed: 1872 (154 years ago)

Specifications
- Capacity: 200
- Materials: Wood

Administration
- Diocese: Nidaros bispedømme
- Deanery: Namdal prosti
- Parish: Flatanger
- Norwegian Cultural Heritage Site
- Type: Church
- Status: Not protected
- ID: 85151

Løvøy Church or Nord-Flatanger Church (Norwegian: Løvøy kirke / Nord-Flatanger kirke) is a parish church of the Church of Norway in Flatanger Municipality in Trøndelag county, Norway. It is located on the island of Lauvøya, just north of the village of Lauvsnes. It is one of the two churches for the Flatanger parish which is part of the Namdal prosti (deanery) in the Diocese of Nidaros. The white, wooden church was built in a long church style in 1872 using plans drawn up by the architect Jakobsen. The church seats about 200 people.

== History ==
The church was built after the old church site was moved from Halmøya island to the present site of Vik Church in the southern part of the municipality. This church was built further north to serve that portion of the municipality. The foundation stone was laid on 9 July 1871 and then it was consecrated on 2 August 1872 by Bishop Andreas Grimelund.

== See also ==
- List of churches in Nidaros
