= Villa Lighthouse =

Villa Lighthouse Villa fyrstasjon
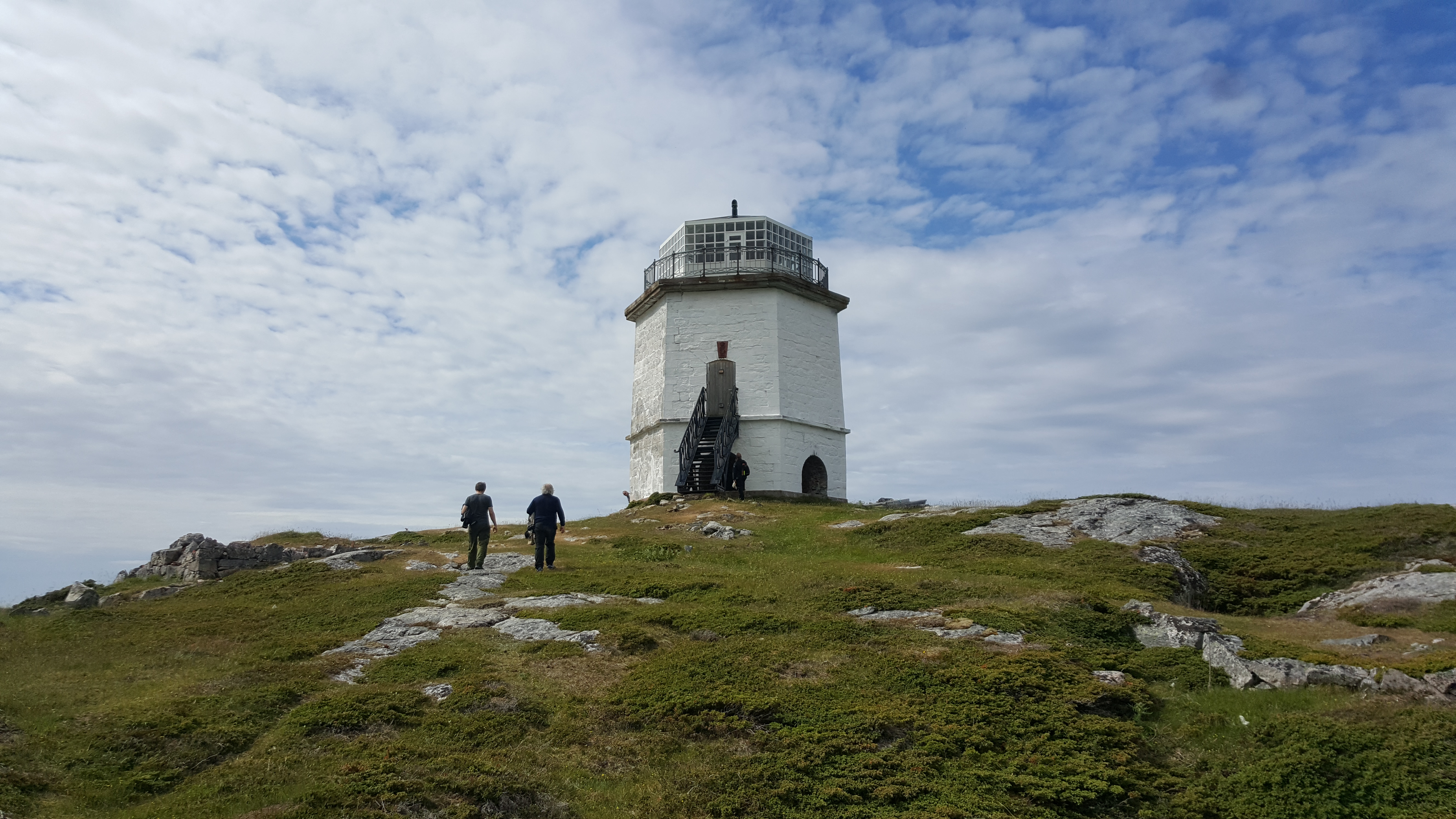
- View of the lighthouse
- Location: Trøndelag, Norway
- Coordinates: 64°32′43.9″N 10°40′52.83″E

Tower
- Constructed: 1839
- Construction: Granite
- Height: 15 metres (49 ft)
- Shape: Hexagonal tower
- Markings: Unpainted with red top
- Operator: Villa Fyr Venneforening
- Heritage: cultural heritage preservation in Norway

Light
- Deactivated: 1890

Villa Lighthouse (Norwegian: Villa fyrstasjon) is a deactivated lighthouse in Flatanger Municipality in Trøndelag county, Norway. The lighthouse was built in 1839 and it was decommissioned in 1890.

Villa Lighthouse is located on the island of Villa in the Folda sea. The 15-metre (49 ft) tall tower was built of granite, soapstone, and brick. It was constructed in a hexagonal shape. The lighthouse was built in 1839 and was the first lighthouse in Norway that was built north of the Trondheimsfjord. It was one of the six coal-fired lighthouses built in Norway during the 1800s, and it is generally considered to be the best preserved of them all.

In 1859, it was upgraded to burn liquid fuels. When the lighthouse closed in 1890, the lens was moved to the Nordøyan Lighthouse. The lighthouse was replaced by the Ellingråsa Lighthouse on the nearby island of Bjørøya.

== See also ==
- Lighthouses in Norway
- List of lighthouses in Norway
