= Jøssund, Flatanger =

Village in Flatanger Municipality, Norway

Jøssund
- Village
- Interactive map of Jøssund
- Location within Trøndelag Location within Norway
- Coordinates: 64.3643°N 10.8248°E
- Country: Norway
- Region: Central Norway
- County: Trøndelag
- District: Namdalen
- Municipality: Flatanger Municipality
- Elevation: 18 m (59 ft)
- Time zone: UTC+01:00 (CET)
  - Summer (DST): UTC+02:00 (CEST)
- Post Code: 7745 Oppland

Jøssund is a village in Flatanger Municipality in Trøndelag county, Norway. It is situated at the end of the Jøssundfjord, about 20 kilometres (12 mi) east of the village of Seter in neighboring Osen Municipality and about 30 kilometres (19 mi) south of the municipal center, Lauvsnes. The population has been declining steadily since World War II, but there is still a shop and cafe in the village.
