= Villa, Norway =

Island in Trøndelag, Norway

Villa
- Interactive map of Villa

Geography
- Location: Trøndelag, Norway
- Coordinates: 64.5470°N 10.6929°E
- Area: 1.2 km^{2} (0.46 sq mi)
- Length: 2 km (1.2 mi)
- Width: 1 km (0.6 mi)
- Coastline: 8 km (5 mi)
- Highest elevation: 106 m (348 ft)
- Highest point: Villafjellet

Administration
- Norway
- County: Trøndelag
- Municipality: Flatanger Municipality

Demographics
- Population: 0

Villa is an island in Flatanger Municipality in Trøndelag county, Norway. The 1.2-square-kilometre (300-acre) island lies in the Folda sea about 1.65 kilometres (1.03 mi) northwest of the village of Lauvsnes on the mainland and about 5 kilometres (3.1 mi) west of the island of Bjørøya. The Villa Lighthouse is located on the western part of the island. The island had some permanent residents until the 1960s, but now it is uninhabited.

Large parts of the island consists of rocky mountains and rocks, but it also has bogs and heather areas and offers a rich flora, with some rare plants such as the yellow water-lily.

== See also ==
- List of islands of Norway
