= Hasvåg =

Village in Flatanger Municipality, Norway

- Village
- Interactive map of Hasvåg
- Location within Trøndelag Location within Norway
- Coordinates: 64.4448°N 10.5990°E
- Country: Norway
- Region: Central Norway
- County: Trøndelag
- District: Namdalen
- Municipality: Flatanger Municipality
- Elevation: 4 m (13 ft)
- Time zone: UTC+01:00 (CET)
  - Summer (DST): UTC+02:00 (CEST)
- Post Code: 7746 Hasvåg

Hasvåg is a seaside village in Flatanger Municipality in Trøndelag county, Norway. The village is located at the end of the Hasvågøya peninsula in the far southwestern edge of the municipality. The village has about fifty inhabitants.

On 28 January 2014, a lightning strike caused a wildfire to spread across the heather fields surrounding the village. The fire destroyed the majority of the houses in Hasvåg, but no one lost their lives.

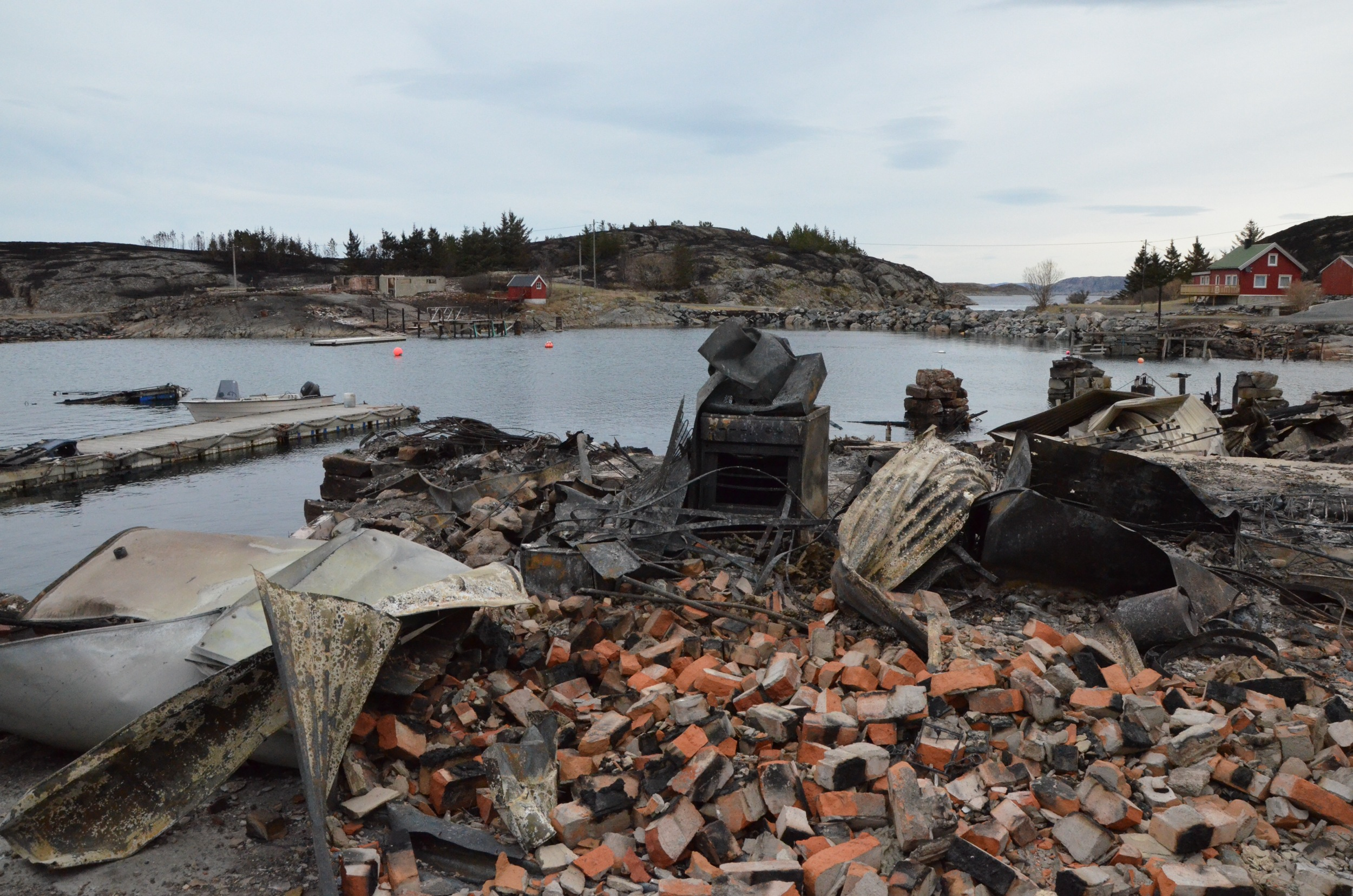
View after the fire

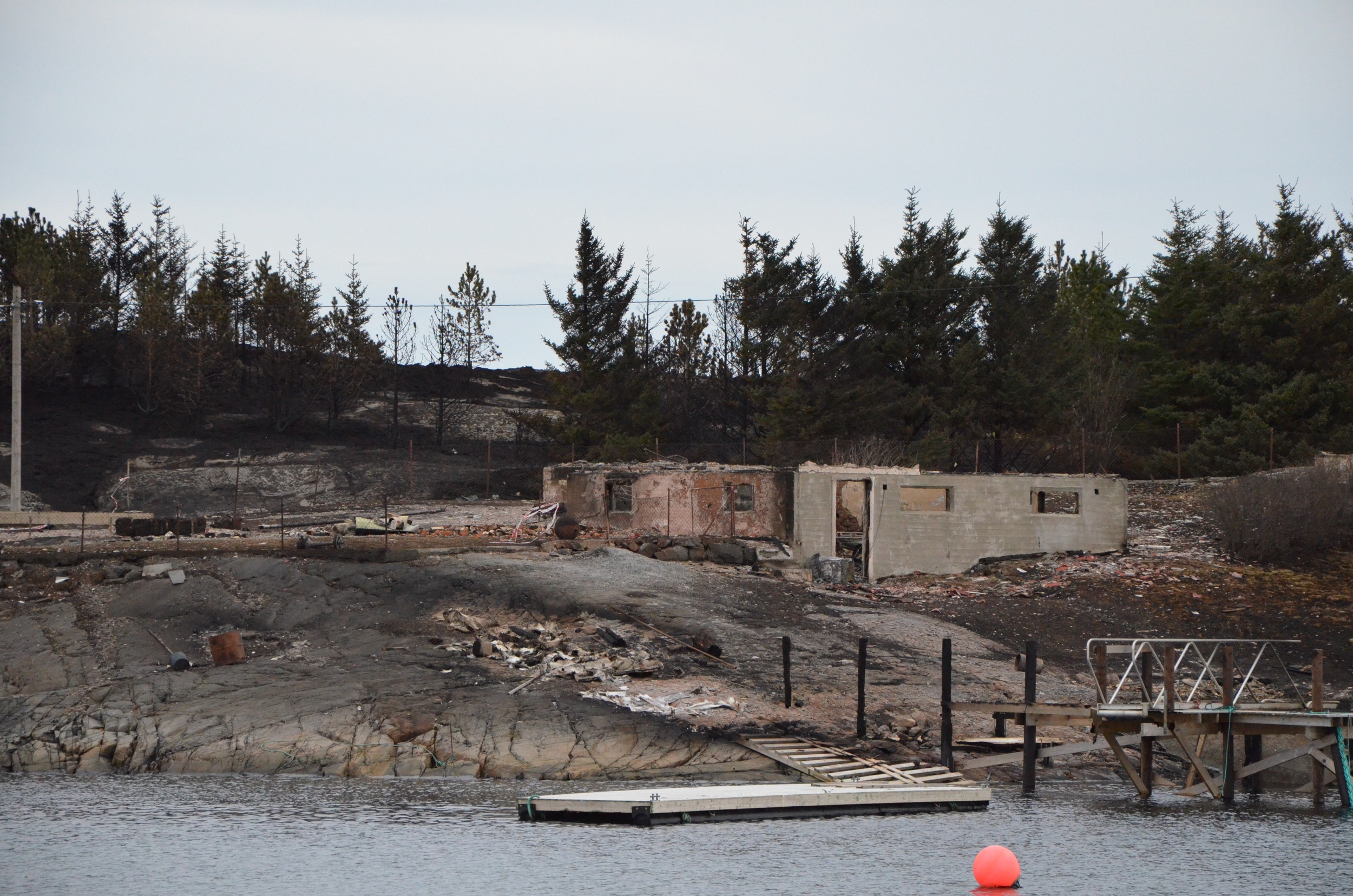
View after the fire
