= Julie Dahle Aagård =

Norwegian singer

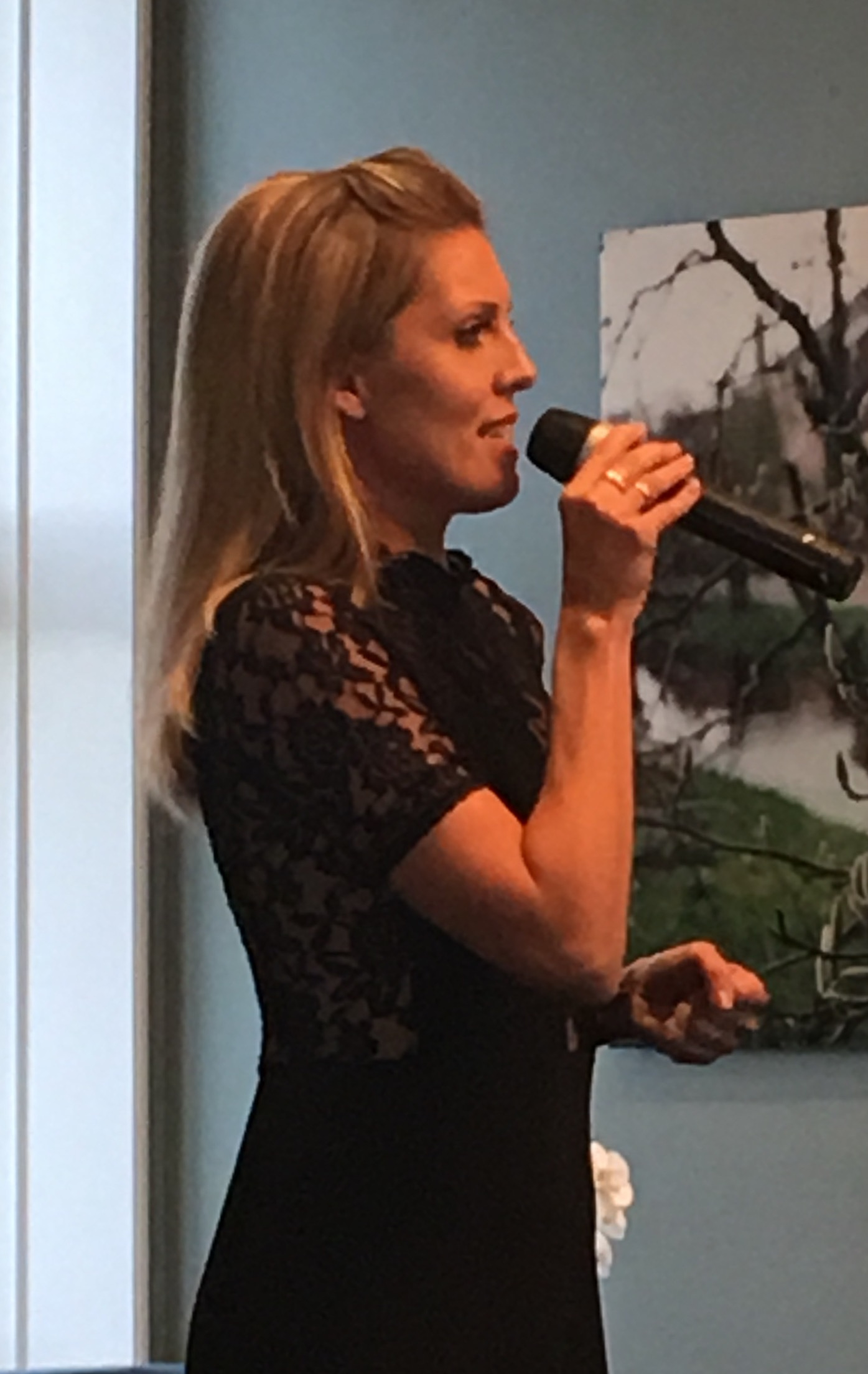

Background information
- Born: 30 December 1978 (age 47); Flatanger Municipality, Nord-Trøndelag
- Origin: Norway
- Genres: Jazz
- Occupations: Jazz singer, composer, band leader
- Instrument: Vocals
- Formerly of: Trondheim Voices
- Website: Julie Dahle Aagård on Myspace

Julie Dahle Aagård (born 30 December 1978) is a Norwegian Jazz musician (vocals). She is the sister of Tora Dahle Aagård.

== Career ==
Aagård is a graduate singing teacher from the Jazz program at Trondheim Musikkonservatorium (1997–2002)

She has also been active in the art scene, first in her own cabaret, Julie, heilt ålein (1998), later in Lady Arbuthnott at Sunndalsøra, Mack & Mabel at "Hedmark Teater" and Havet legg aldri stilt (Norveg). She played the Primary Role in the production Piaf (2005) at Det Norske Teatret and in 2010 she was the slave Anna, in the historic play "Håkon og Kark" (Korsvikaspillet) at Lade in Trondheim.

Her debut solo album Det Klaraste Lyset, produced by Åge Aleksandersen, and premiered at the World Ski Championships 1997 in Trondheim. She also released Goodnight Stranger. She collaborates in the bands "Gutvik 5" (Ketil Gutvik), Cannonballs, and Reggae Kings. She was a leading figure in the quintet Subtonic from 2003, where her texts appeared on the album In This House (2004).

In 2002 she performed the songs "Follow Your Heart", "It's What's Inside That Counts", "The World is Looking Up to You" and "Put It Together" in the Norwegian version of Disney's Cinderella II: Dreams Come True.

For a few years, Aagård has toured with the Trondheim Voices, and in 2009 she released the solo album Stompin' Feet, nominated for Spellemannprisen 2009 in the category Female artist. The debut performance with her own band Julie Dahle Aagård Orchestra was at Jazzfest, the Trondheim Jazz Festival in 2009.

== Discography ==
=== Solo albums ===
- 1997: Det Klaraste Lyset (Norske Gram)
- 2001: Goodnight Stranger (Jo Vestly Produksjon)
- 2009: Stompin' Feet (Sweet Morning Records)

=== Collaborations ===
Within the quintet Subtonic

- 2004: In This House (Aim Records)
- 2006: Oslo Jazzfestival 20 År (Oslo Jazzfestival), with various artists ("Next Time")
