= Bjørøya =

Island in Trøndelag, Norway

- Interactive map of Bjørøya

Geography
- Location: Trøndelag, Norway
- Coordinates: 64.5735°N 10.8211°E
- Area: 3.8 km^{2} (1.5 sq mi)
- Length: 2.7 km (1.68 mi)
- Width: 2.5 km (1.55 mi)
- Highest elevation: 130 m (430 ft)
- Highest point: Sørfjellet

Administration
- Norway
- County: Trøndelag
- Municipality: Flatanger Municipality

Demographics
- Population: 0

Bjørøya is an island in the Folda sea, just south of the Namsenfjorden in Flatanger Municipality in Trøndelag county, Norway. The 3.8-square-kilometre (1.5 sq mi) island lies about 5 kilometres (3.1 mi) east of the island of Villa and about 5 kilometres (3.1 mi) north of the island of Lauvøya. The island has several large peat bogs as well as a farm. Ellingråsa Lighthouse is located on the northwest part of the island. The island has had no permanent residents since the 1970s.

== See also ==
- List of islands of Norway
