= Flatanger Municipality =

Municipality in Trøndelag, Norway

Flatanger Municipality Flatanger kommune
- Municipality
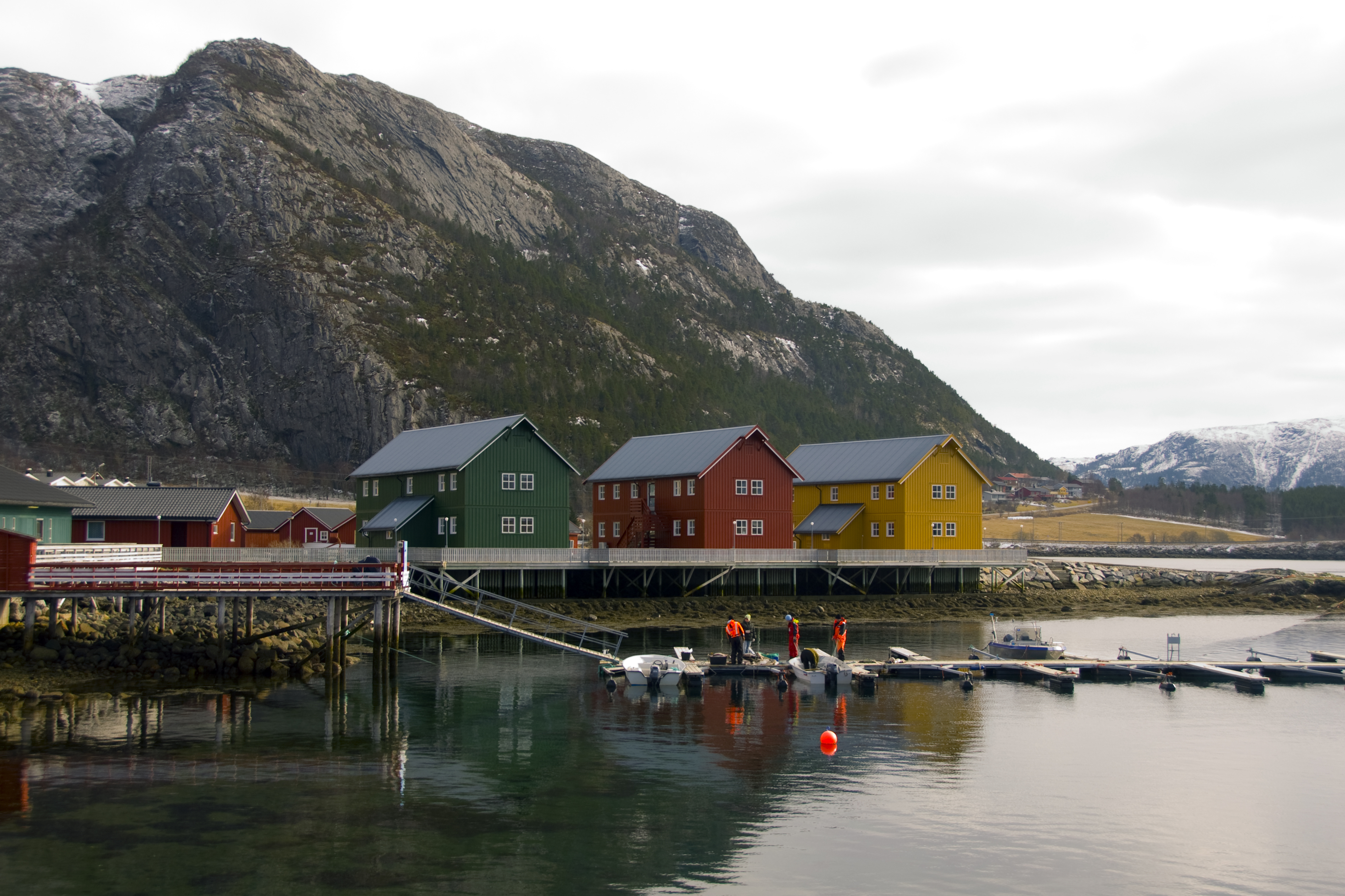

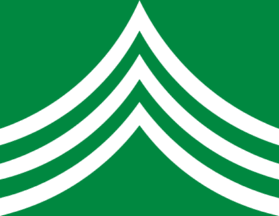
- Flag Coat of arms

- Trøndelag within Norway

- Flatanger within Trøndelag
- Coordinates: 64°25′11″N 10°54′28″E
- Country: Norway
- County: Trøndelag
- District: Namdalen
- Established: 1 Jan 1871
  - Preceded by: Fosnes Municipality
- Administrative centre: Lauvsnes

Government
  - Mayor (2011): Olav Jørgen Bjørkås (Sp)

Area
  - Total: 458.71 km^{2} (177.11 sq mi)
  - Land: 433.53 km^{2} (167.39 sq mi)
  - Water: 25.18 km^{2} (9.72 sq mi) 5.5%
  - Rank: #216 in Norway
- Highest elevation: 611.49 m (2,006.2 ft)

Population (2024)
  - Total: 1,116
  - Rank: #326 in Norway
  - Density: 2.4/km^{2} (6.2/sq mi)
  - Change (10 years): ▼ −0.4%
- Demonym: Flatangring

Official language
  - Norwegian form: Neutral
- Time zone: UTC+01:00 (CET)
  - Summer (DST): UTC+02:00 (CEST)
- ISO 3166 code: NO-5049
- Website: Official website

Flatanger is a municipality in Trøndelag county, Norway. It is part of the Namdalen region. The administrative centre of the municipality is Lauvsnes. Other villages include Jøssund, Hasvåg, and Vik.

The 459-square-kilometre (177 sq mi) municipality is the 216th largest by area out of the 357 municipalities in Norway. Flatanger Municipality is the 326th most populous municipality in Norway with a population of 1,116. The municipality's population density is 2.4 inhabitants per square kilometre (6.2/sq mi) and its population has decreased by 0.4% over the previous 10-year period.

Flatanger is also known for having some of the most difficult sport climbing routes in the world.

== General ==
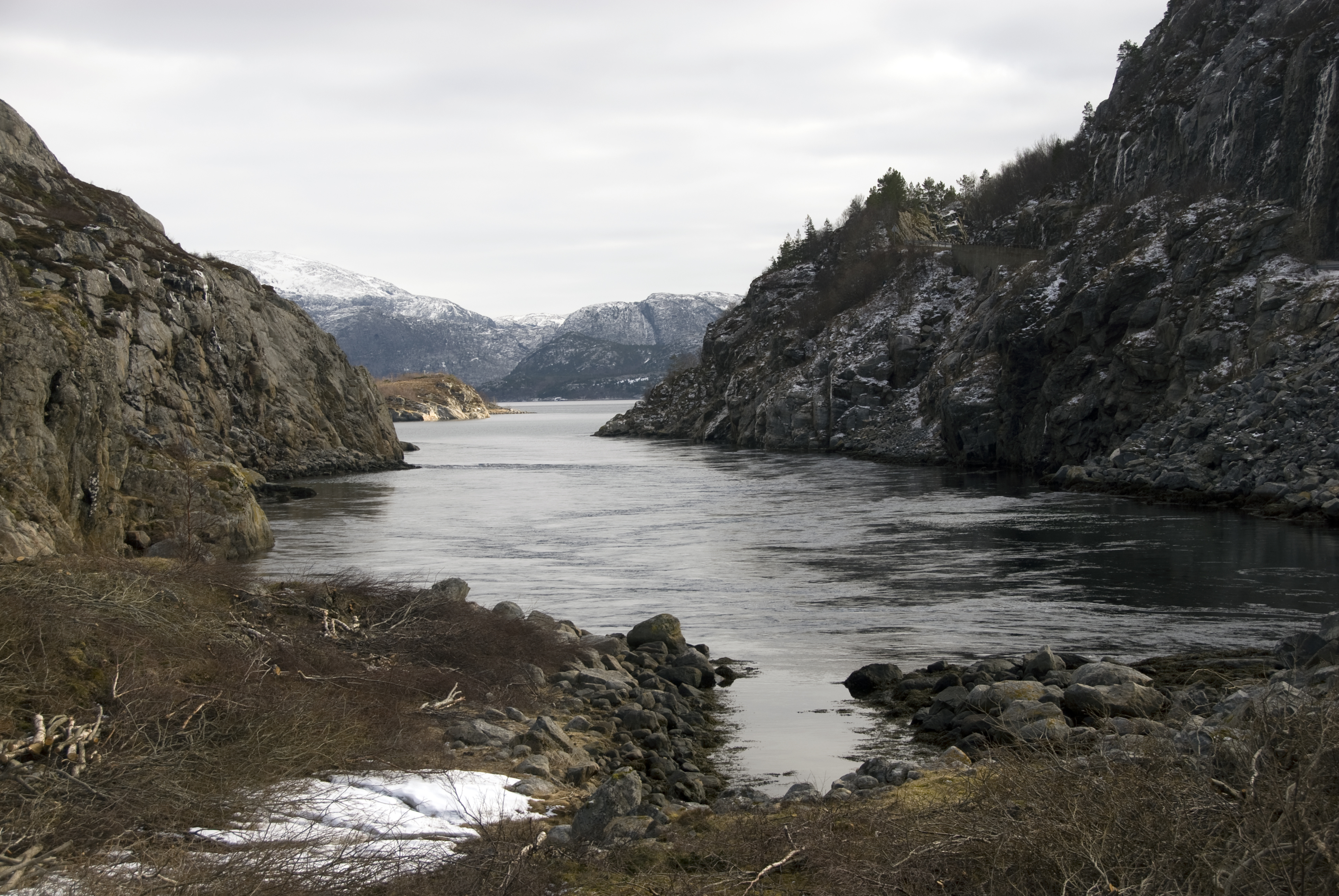
View of a small fjord in Flatanger

Flatanger was established as a municipality in the old Nord-Trøndelag county on 1 January 1871 when it was separated from the large Fosnes Municipality. Initially, Flatanger Municipality had 1,472 residents. It is one of the few municipalities in Norway whose boundaries have not changed since it was established. In 2018, it became part of the newly created Trøndelag county.

=== Name ===
The municipality is likely named after one of the local fjords (Old Norse: Flat(r)angr), but it is not known exactly which one. The first element is flatr which means "flat" or "shallow". The last element is angr which means "fjord or inlet".

=== Coat of arms ===
The coat of arms was granted on 12 October 1990. The official blazon is "Vert, three chevronels embowed argent" (Norwegian: I grønt tre innbøyde sølv sparrer). This means the arms have a green field (background) and the charge is three chevrons with a slight curve to them. The charge has a tincture of argent which means it is commonly colored white, but if it is made out of metal, then silver is used. The green color was chosen to represent the agriculture industry in the municipality. The design was chosen to represent the bow of a boat, seen from the front, since boats have a great historical significance in this coastal fishing community. The arms were designed by Even Jarl Skoglund.

=== Churches ===
The Church of Norway has one parish (sokn) within Flatanger Municipality. It is part of the Namdal prosti (deanery) in the Diocese of Nidaros.

Churches in Flatanger Municipality
Parish (sokn)	Church name	Location of the church	Year built
Flatanger	Vik Church	Vik	1873
Flatanger	Løvøy Church	Lauvøya	1871

== Geography ==
The municipality consists mostly of mainland, but also includes almost 1,400 islands of various sizes. Some of the major islands include Bjørøya, Lauvøya, Villa, Halmøya, and Kvernøya. Ellingråsa Lighthouse is located on the island of Bjørøya and Villa Lighthouse is on Villa. These islands all lie on the south side of the Folda firth. The Namsenfjorden forms part of the northern boundary of the municipality. The highest point in the municipality is the 611.49-metre (2,006.2 ft) tall mountain Beingårdsheia in the southeastern part of the municipality near the border with Namsos Municipality.

== Government ==
Flatanger Municipality is responsible for primary education (through 10th grade), outpatient health services, senior citizen services, welfare and other social services, zoning, economic development, and municipal roads and utilities. The municipality is governed by a municipal council of directly elected representatives. The mayor is indirectly elected by a vote of the municipal council. The municipality is under the jurisdiction of the Trøndelag District Court and the Frostating Court of Appeal.

Municipal waste management has since 1979 been handled by the inter-municipal Midtre Namdal Avfallsselskap, with ReTrans Midt handling waste collection since 2018.

=== Politics ===
In the 2007 municipal elections, Flatanger Municipality had the highest vote for the Venstre party in all of Norway, at 42.9 per cent.

=== Municipal council ===
The municipal council (Kommunestyre) of Flatanger Municipality is made up of 15 representatives that are elected to four year terms. The tables below show the current and historical composition of the council by political party.

Flatanger kommunestyre 2023–2027
Party name (in Norwegian)	Number of representatives
Labour Party (Arbeiderpartiet)	2
Progress Party (Fremskrittspartiet)	5
Conservative Party (Høyre)	2
Centre Party (Senterpartiet)	4
Socialist Left Party (Sosialistisk Venstreparti)	2
Total number of members:	15

Flatanger kommunestyre 2019–2023
Party name (in Norwegian)	Number of representatives
Labour Party (Arbeiderpartiet)	2
Progress Party (Fremskrittspartiet)	3
Conservative Party (Høyre)	2
Centre Party (Senterpartiet)	5
Socialist Left Party (Sosialistisk Venstreparti)	3
Total number of members:	15

Flatanger kommunestyre 2015–2019
Party name (in Norwegian)	Number of representatives
Labour Party (Arbeiderpartiet)	3
Progress Party (Fremskrittspartiet)	2
Conservative Party (Høyre)	2
Centre Party (Senterpartiet)	4
Socialist Left Party (Sosialistisk Venstreparti)	2
Liberal Party (Venstre)	2
Total number of members:	15

Flatanger kommunestyre 2011–2015
Party name (in Norwegian)	Number of representatives
Labour Party (Arbeiderpartiet)	2
Progress Party (Fremskrittspartiet)	2
Conservative Party (Høyre)	2
Centre Party (Senterpartiet)	3
Socialist Left Party (Sosialistisk Venstreparti)	1
Liberal Party (Venstre)	5
Total number of members:	15

Flatanger kommunestyre 2007–2011
Party name (in Norwegian)	Number of representatives
Progress Party (Fremskrittspartiet)	2
Conservative Party (Høyre)	2
Centre Party (Senterpartiet)	2
Liberal Party (Venstre)	8
Joint list of the Labour Party (Arbeiderpartiet) and the Socialist Left Party (Sosialistisk Venstreparti)	3
Total number of members:	17

Flatanger kommunestyre 2003–2007
Party name (in Norwegian)	Number of representatives
Labour Party (Arbeiderpartiet)	3
Progress Party (Fremskrittspartiet)	2
Conservative Party (Høyre)	3
Centre Party (Senterpartiet)	3
Socialist Left Party (Sosialistisk Venstreparti)	1
Liberal Party (Venstre)	5
Total number of members:	17

Flatanger kommunestyre 1999–2003
Party name (in Norwegian)	Number of representatives
Labour Party (Arbeiderpartiet)	4
Conservative Party (Høyre)	3
Christian Democratic Party (Kristelig Folkeparti)	1
Centre Party (Senterpartiet)	5
Socialist Left Party (Sosialistisk Venstreparti)	1
Liberal Party (Venstre)	3
Total number of members:	17

Flatanger kommunestyre 1995–1999
Party name (in Norwegian)	Number of representatives
Labour Party (Arbeiderpartiet)	5
Conservative Party (Høyre)	2
Christian Democratic Party (Kristelig Folkeparti)	1
Centre Party (Senterpartiet)	5
Socialist Left Party (Sosialistisk Venstreparti)	2
Liberal Party (Venstre)	2
Total number of members:	17

Flatanger kommunestyre 1991–1995
Party name (in Norwegian)	Number of representatives
Labour Party (Arbeiderpartiet)	5
Conservative Party (Høyre)	2
Christian Democratic Party (Kristelig Folkeparti)	1
Centre Party (Senterpartiet)	6
Socialist Left Party (Sosialistisk Venstreparti)	1
Liberal Party (Venstre)	2
Total number of members:	17

Flatanger kommunestyre 1987–1991
Party name (in Norwegian)	Number of representatives
Labour Party (Arbeiderpartiet)	5
Conservative Party (Høyre)	3
Socialist Left Party (Sosialistisk Venstreparti)	1
Liberal Party (Venstre)	1
Joint list of the Centre Party (Senterpartiet) and the Christian Democratic Party (Kristelig Folkeparti)	5
Flatanger Non-party Election List (Flatanger Upolitiske Valgliste)	2
Total number of members:	17

Flatanger kommunestyre 1983–1987
Party name (in Norwegian)	Number of representatives
Labour Party (Arbeiderpartiet)	6
Conservative Party (Høyre)	2
Christian Democratic Party (Kristelig Folkeparti)	1
Centre Party (Senterpartiet)	3
Liberal Party (Venstre)	1
Flatanger non-party election list (Flatanger upolitiske valgliste)	4
Total number of members:	17

Flatanger kommunestyre 1979–1983
Party name (in Norwegian)	Number of representatives
Labour Party (Arbeiderpartiet)	5
Conservative Party (Høyre)	4
Christian Democratic Party (Kristelig Folkeparti)	2
Centre Party (Senterpartiet)	3
Liberal Party (Venstre)	1
Flatanger non-party election list (Flatanger upolitiske valgliste)	2
Total number of members:	17

Flatanger kommunestyre 1975–1979
Party name (in Norwegian)	Number of representatives
Labour Party (Arbeiderpartiet)	3
Christian Democratic Party (Kristelig Folkeparti)	2
Centre Party (Senterpartiet)	3
Liberal Party (Venstre)	1
Non-party common list (Upolitisk Fellesliste)	5
Non-party election list (Upolitisk Valgliste)	3
Total number of members:	17

Flatanger kommunestyre 1971–1975
Party name (in Norwegian)	Number of representatives
Labour Party (Arbeiderpartiet)	4
Christian Democratic Party (Kristelig Folkeparti)	2
Centre Party (Senterpartiet)	4
Liberal Party (Venstre)	1
Local List(s) (Lokale lister)	6
Total number of members:	17

Flatanger kommunestyre 1967–1971
Party name (in Norwegian)	Number of representatives
Labour Party (Arbeiderpartiet)	4
Christian Democratic Party (Kristelig Folkeparti)	1
Centre Party (Senterpartiet)	4
Joint List(s) of Non-Socialist Parties (Borgerlige Felleslister)	4
Local List(s) (Lokale lister)	4
Total number of members:	17

Flatanger kommunestyre 1963–1967
Party name (in Norwegian)	Number of representatives
Labour Party (Arbeiderpartiet)	5
Christian Democratic Party (Kristelig Folkeparti)	1
Centre Party (Senterpartiet)	4
Joint List(s) of Non-Socialist Parties (Borgerlige Felleslister)	3
Local List(s) (Lokale lister)	4
Total number of members:	17

Flatanger herredsstyre 1959–1963
Party name (in Norwegian)	Number of representatives
Labour Party (Arbeiderpartiet)	4
Christian Democratic Party (Kristelig Folkeparti)	1
Centre Party (Senterpartiet)	3
Joint List(s) of Non-Socialist Parties (Borgerlige Felleslister)	5
Local List(s) (Lokale lister)	4
Total number of members:	17

Flatanger herredsstyre 1955–1959
Party name (in Norwegian)	Number of representatives
Labour Party (Arbeiderpartiet)	5
Joint List(s) of Non-Socialist Parties (Borgerlige Felleslister)	6
Local List(s) (Lokale lister)	6
Total number of members:	17

Flatanger herredsstyre 1951–1955
Party name (in Norwegian)	Number of representatives
Labour Party (Arbeiderpartiet)	5
Joint List(s) of Non-Socialist Parties (Borgerlige Felleslister)	7
Local List(s) (Lokale lister)	4
Total number of members:	16

Flatanger herredsstyre 1947–1951
Party name (in Norwegian)	Number of representatives
Labour Party (Arbeiderpartiet)	4
List of workers, fishermen, and small farmholders (Arbeidere, fiskere, småbrukere liste)	1
Joint List(s) of Non-Socialist Parties (Borgerlige Felleslister)	5
Local List(s) (Lokale lister)	6
Total number of members:	16

Flatanger herredsstyre 1945–1947
Party name (in Norwegian)	Number of representatives
Labour Party (Arbeiderpartiet)	5
Christian Democratic Party (Kristelig Folkeparti)	1
List of workers, fishermen, and small farmholders (Arbeidere, fiskere, småbrukere liste)	1
Joint List(s) of Non-Socialist Parties (Borgerlige Felleslister)	5
Local List(s) (Lokale lister)	4
Total number of members:	16

Flatanger herredsstyre 1937–1941*
Party name (in Norwegian)	Number of representatives
Labour Party (Arbeiderpartiet)	3
List of workers, fishermen, and small farmholders (Arbeidere, fiskere, småbrukere liste)	6
Local List(s) (Lokale lister)	7
Total number of members:	16
Note: Due to the German occupation of Norway during World War II, no elections were held for new municipal councils until after the war ended in 1945.

=== Mayors ===
The mayor (Norwegian: ordfører) of Flatanger Municipality is the political leader of the municipality and the chairperson of the municipal council. Here is a list of people who have held this position:

- 1871–1877: Olaus Vedege
- 1878–1879: Andreas Saxegård
- 1880–1883: Bernt H. Solem
- 1884–1885: Peder Musum
- 1886–1887: Ole Martin Løfsnes
- 1888–1893: Albert Opland (V)
- 1894–1898: Odin Aune (V)
- 1899–1901: Albert Opland (V)
- 1902–1916: Odin Aune (V)
- 1917–1928: Carl Sitter (V)
- 1929–1934: Anton Høstland (Bp)
- 1935–1937: Sigurd Halmøy (KrF)
- 1938–1940: Øistein Aarseth (V)
- 1941–1945: Lauritz Sved
- 1945–1947: Øistein Aarseth (V)
- 1948–1951: Anton Høstland (Bp)
- 1952–1953: Sverre Hustad (Ap)
- 1954–1955: Ingolf Lindseth
- 1956–1961: Carl Gulbrandsen (LL)
- 1962–1967: Birger Skotnes (LL)
- 1968–1969: Aage Aagård (Sp)
- 1970–1973: Otmar Lauvsnes (Sp)
- 1973–1979: Aage Aagård (Sp)
- 1980–1987: Øyvind Mårvik (LL)
- 1988–1995: Ronald Geving (Sp)
- 1995–1999: Per Bårdsen (Ap)
- 1999–2003: Trond Strøm (Sp)
- 2003–2011: Reidar Lindseth (V)
- 2011–present: Olav Jørgen Bjørkås (Sp)

== Attractions ==
=== Rock climbing ===
Flatanger is home to some of the world's hardest sport climbs that are located in the nearby Hanshelleren Cave. In 2012, Adam Ondra completed the redpoint of Change, which became the first-ever rock climbing route in history to be graded at 9b+ (5.15c). In 2017, Ondra completed the redpoint of Silence, which then became the first-ever to be graded at 9c (5.15d). The cave has attracted many of the world's strongest sport climbers.

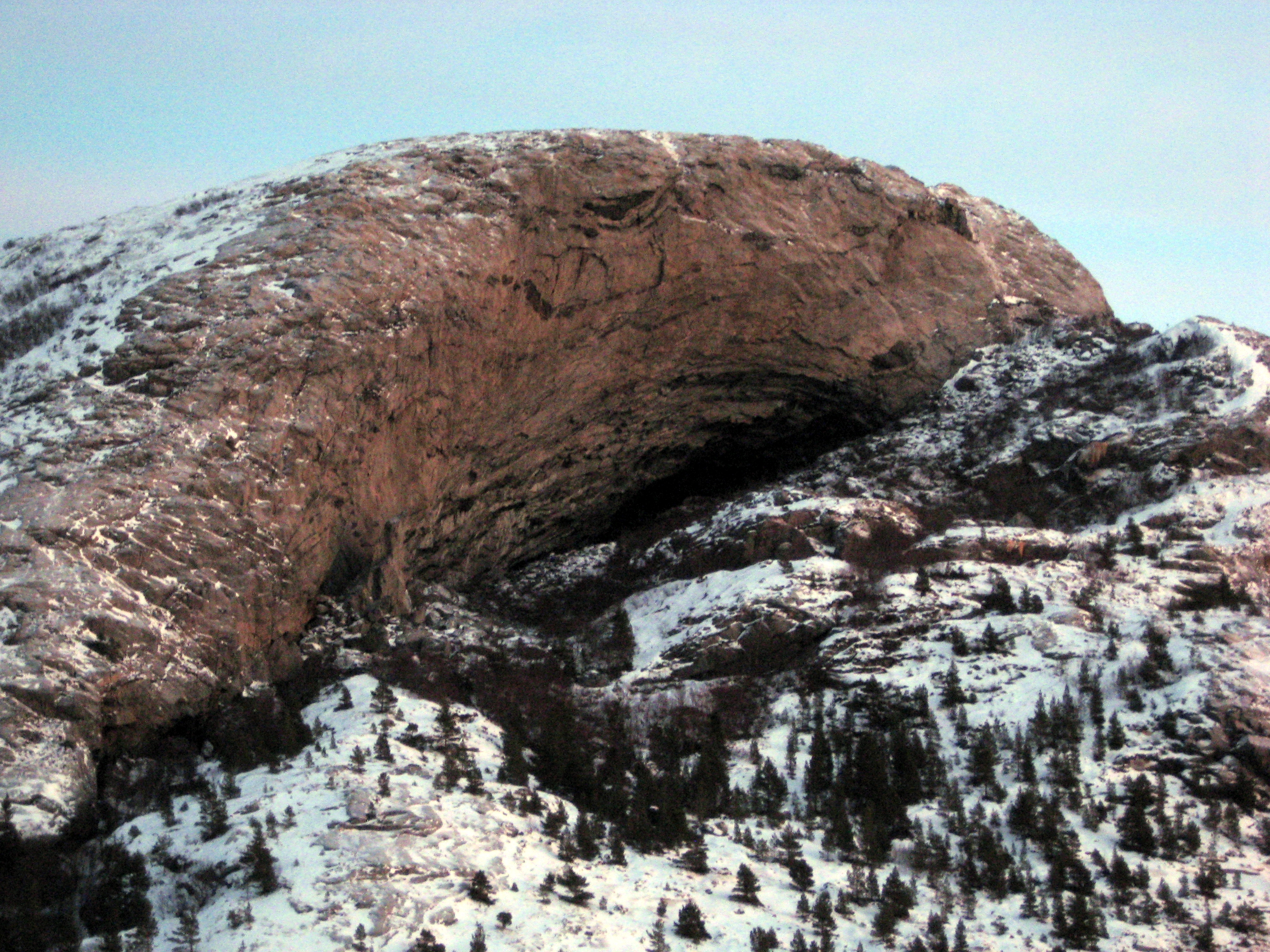
Hanshelleren Cave, home to the world's hardest sport climbs

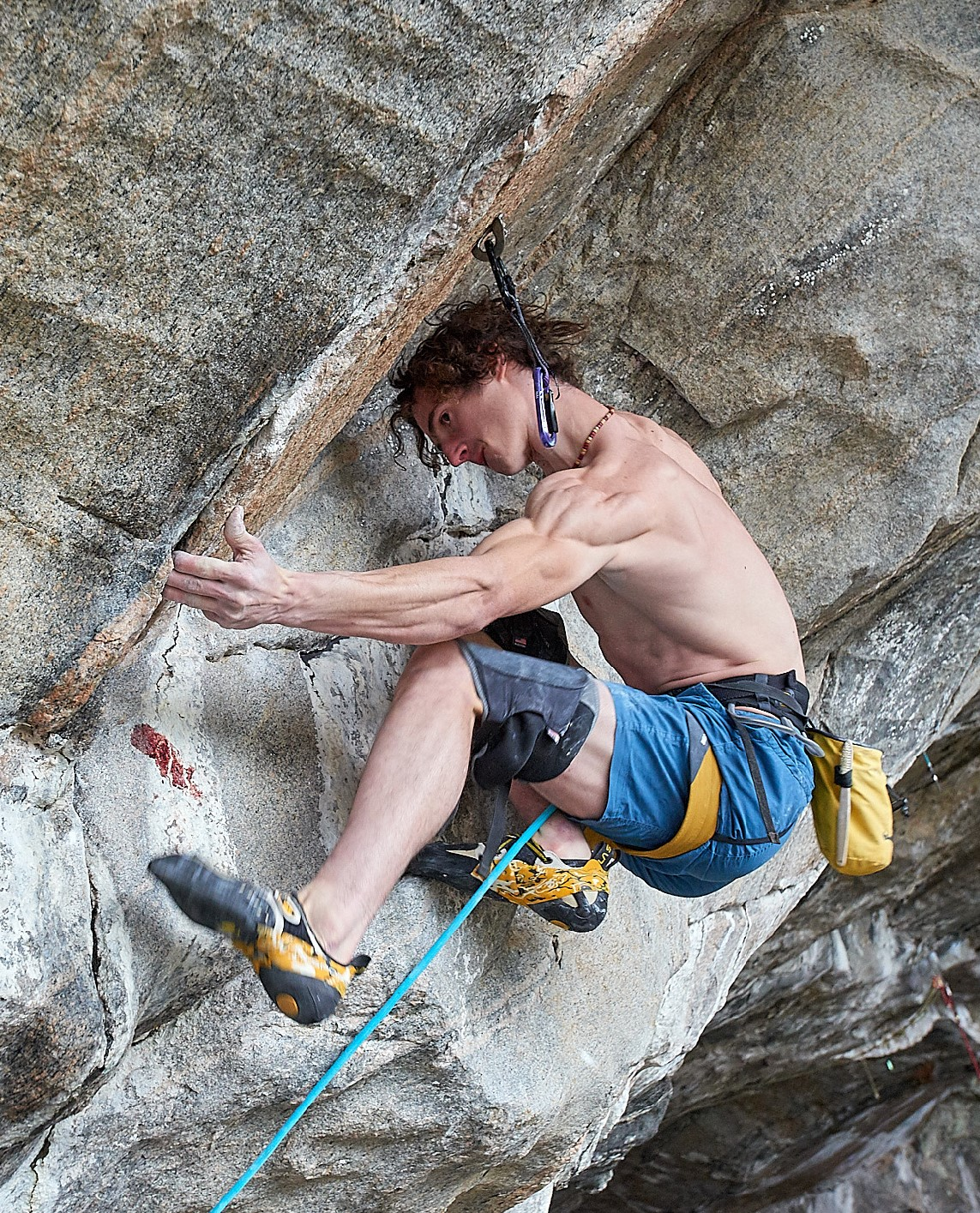
Adam Ondra on Silence 9c (5.15d)

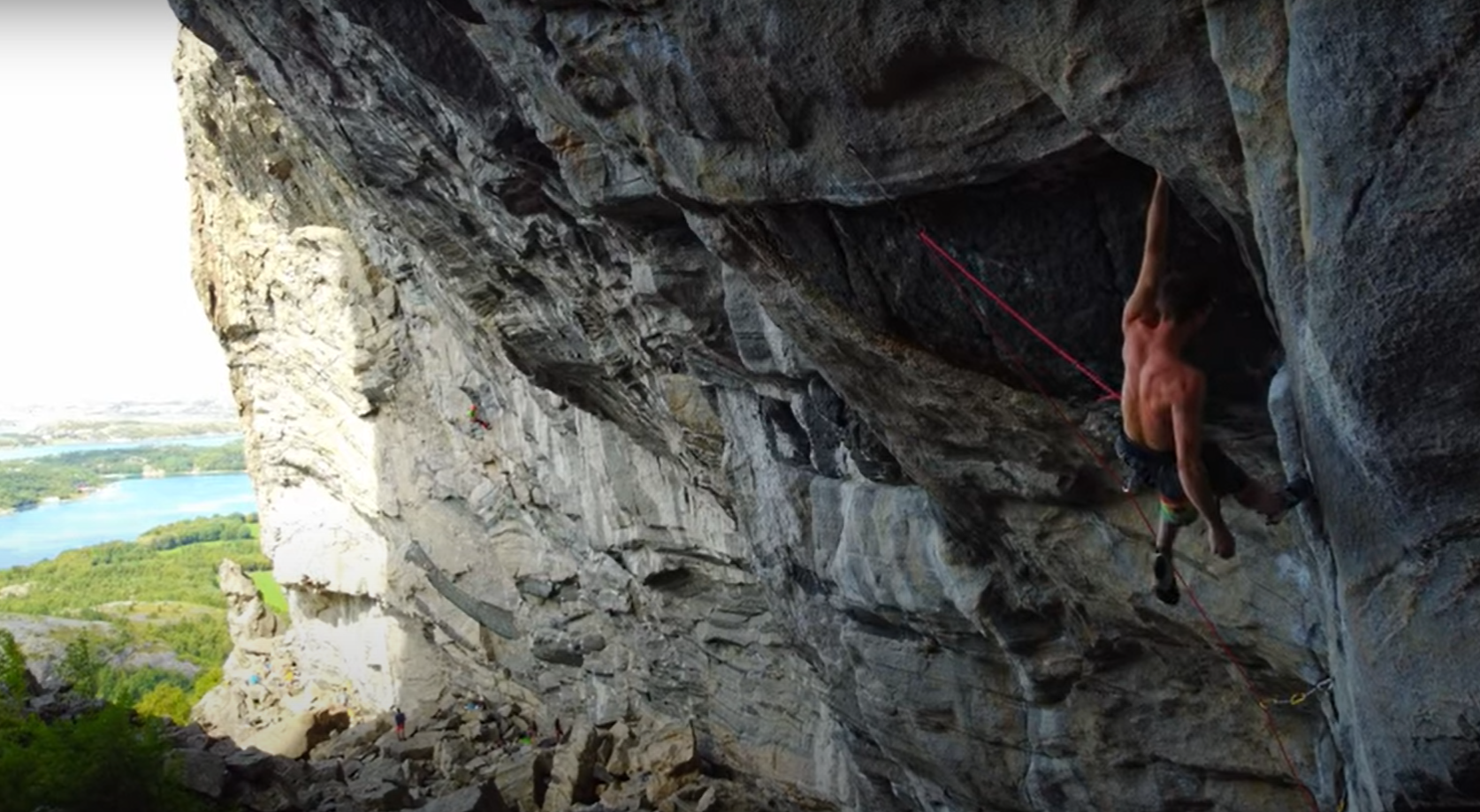
Moritz Welt on Odin's Eye 8c+ (5.14c)

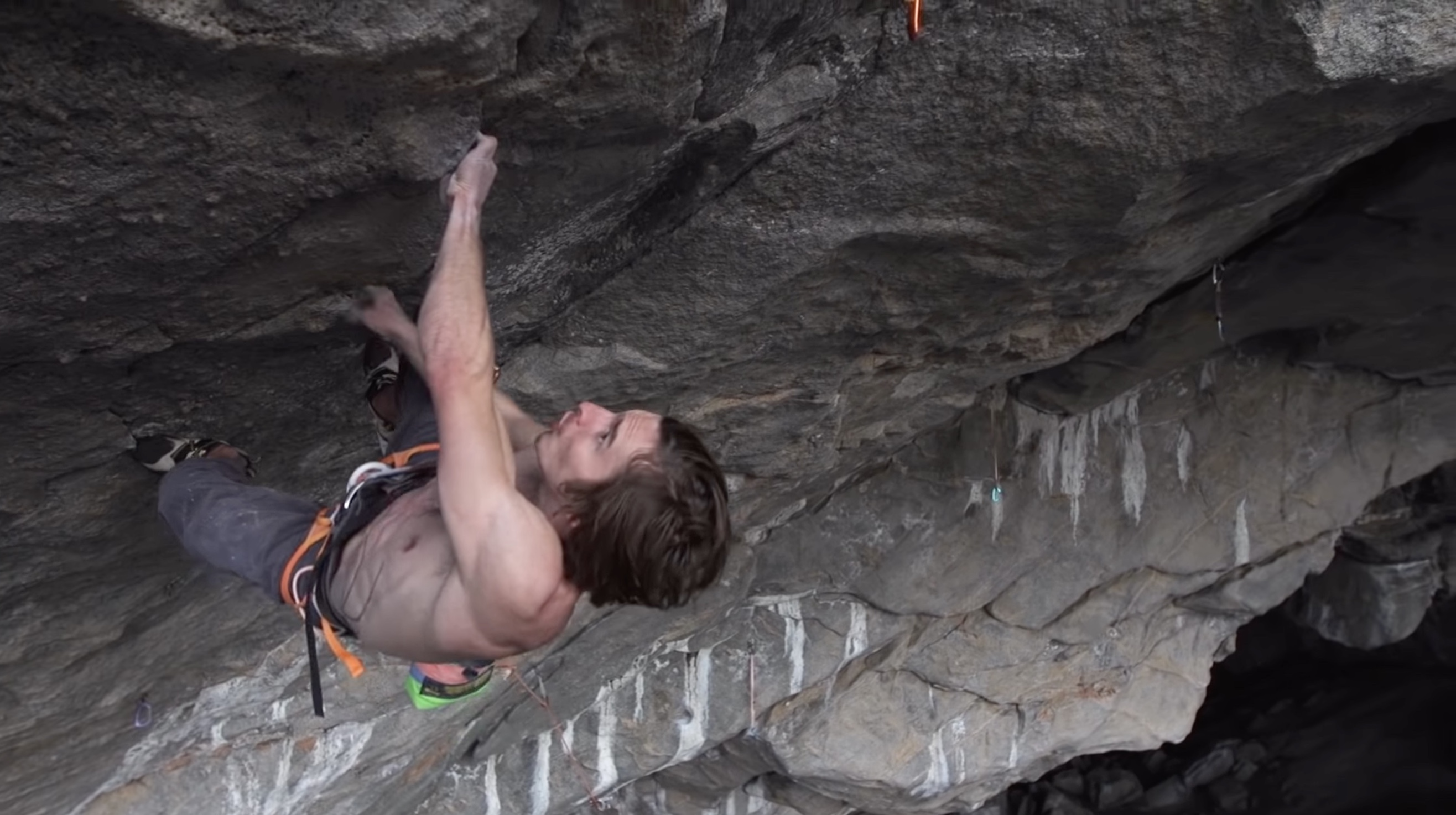
Daniel Woods on Thor's Hammer 9a+ (5.15a)

== Notable people ==
- Ole Konrad Ribsskog (1865 in Flatanger – 1941), a teacher and politician who was Mayor of Trondheim
- Toralf Sandø (1899 in Flatanger – 1970), a film director and actor
- Julie Dahle Aagård (born 1978 in Flatanger), a jazz singer and sister of Tora Dahle Aagård
- Tora Dahle Aagård (born 1994 in Flatanger), a guitarist, singer, songwriter, and sister of Julie Dahle Aagård
- Brede Moe (born 1991 in Flatanger), a footballer with 180 club caps
