= Trondheim Voices =

Norwegian vocal group

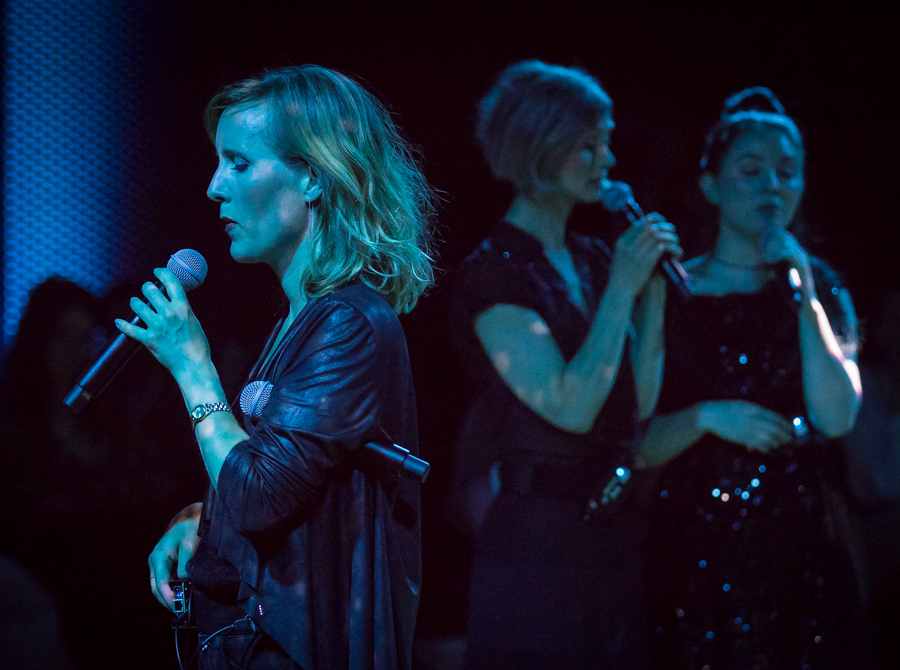
- Trondheim Voices in 2017

Background information
- Origin: Trondheim, Norway
- Genres: Jazz & Vocal music
- Years active: 2001–present
- Labels: MNJ Records
- Members: Tone Åse; Heidi Skjerve; Ingrid Lode; Siri Gjære; Kirsti Huke; Sissel Vera Pettersen; Live Maria Roggen; Anita Kaasbøll; Torunn Sævik; Silje Karlsen
- Past members: Eldbjørg Raknes; Solveig Slettahjell; Julie Dahle Aagård; Benedicte Swendgaard; Mirella Pendolin; Marita Røstad; Siri Gellein; Helene Dybdahl
- Website: Official website

Trondheim Voices (established 2001 in Trondheim, Norway) is a Norwegian vocal group, best known for their improvised performances in the jazz genre.

== Biography ==
Trondheim Voices started out as a Christmas Concert, initiated by Midtnorsk Jazzsenter (MNJ) in 2001, and subsequently developed into a permanent group with a consistent vocal ensemble and a specially made repertoire.

The state supported ensemble has had up to fifteen singers. Today the ensemble counts eight to nine singers, and both crew and artistic directors vary from project to project. Among others Live Maria Roggen, Eldbjørg Raknes, and Tone Åse have had artistic directory for projects together with «Cirka Teater».

Trondheim Voices is a department of high priority at MNJ (Midtnorsk Jazzsenter), with Tone Åse as artistic leader. At «Trondheim Kammermusikkfestival» 2004, they performed compositions by Live Marie Roggen and Eldbjørg Raknes (broadcast by NRK P2). They appeared at Moldejazz 2003, and again in 2006 in the production Norwegian Sanctus by Terje Bjørklund, interacting with Trondheim Soloists, Arve Henriksen and Stian Westerhus. They premiered the show «Bingo» at «Olavsfestdagene» 2008, with lyrics by Siri Gjære and music by Elin Rosseland, Ståle Storløkken and Live Maria Roggen. In 2010 they released their first album.

The pianist and composer Jon Balke wrote a commissioned piece for the vocal improvisation ensemble Trondheim Voices and the percussion group Batagraf, performed at the Moldejazz 2011.

== Band members ==
=== Present members ===
- Tone Åse
- Heidi Skjerve
- Ingrid Lode
- Siri Gjære
- Kirsti Huke
- Sissel Vera Pettersen
- Live Maria Roggen
- Anita Kaasbøll
- Torunn Sævik
- Silje Karlsen (understudy)

=== Past members ===
- Eldbjørg Raknes
- Solveig Slettahjell
- Julie Dahle Aagård
- Benedicte Swendgaard
- Mirella Pendolin
- Marita Røstad
- Siri Gellein
- Helene Dybdahl

== Discography ==
- Improvoicing (CD Midt-Norsk Jazzsenter, 2010). Musikk fra oppsetningen Bingo i 2008, samt Moldejazz-oppsetningen Improvoicing med Jon Balke og Marilyn Mazur i 2009. Besetningen er Tone Åse, Heidi Skjerve, Ingrid Lode, Siri Gjære, Kirsti Huke, Sissel Vera Pettersen, Live Maria Roggen, Anita Kaasbøll og Silje Karlsen.
