= Vik Church (Flatanger) =

Church in Trøndelag, Norway

- Vik kirke / Flatanger kirke
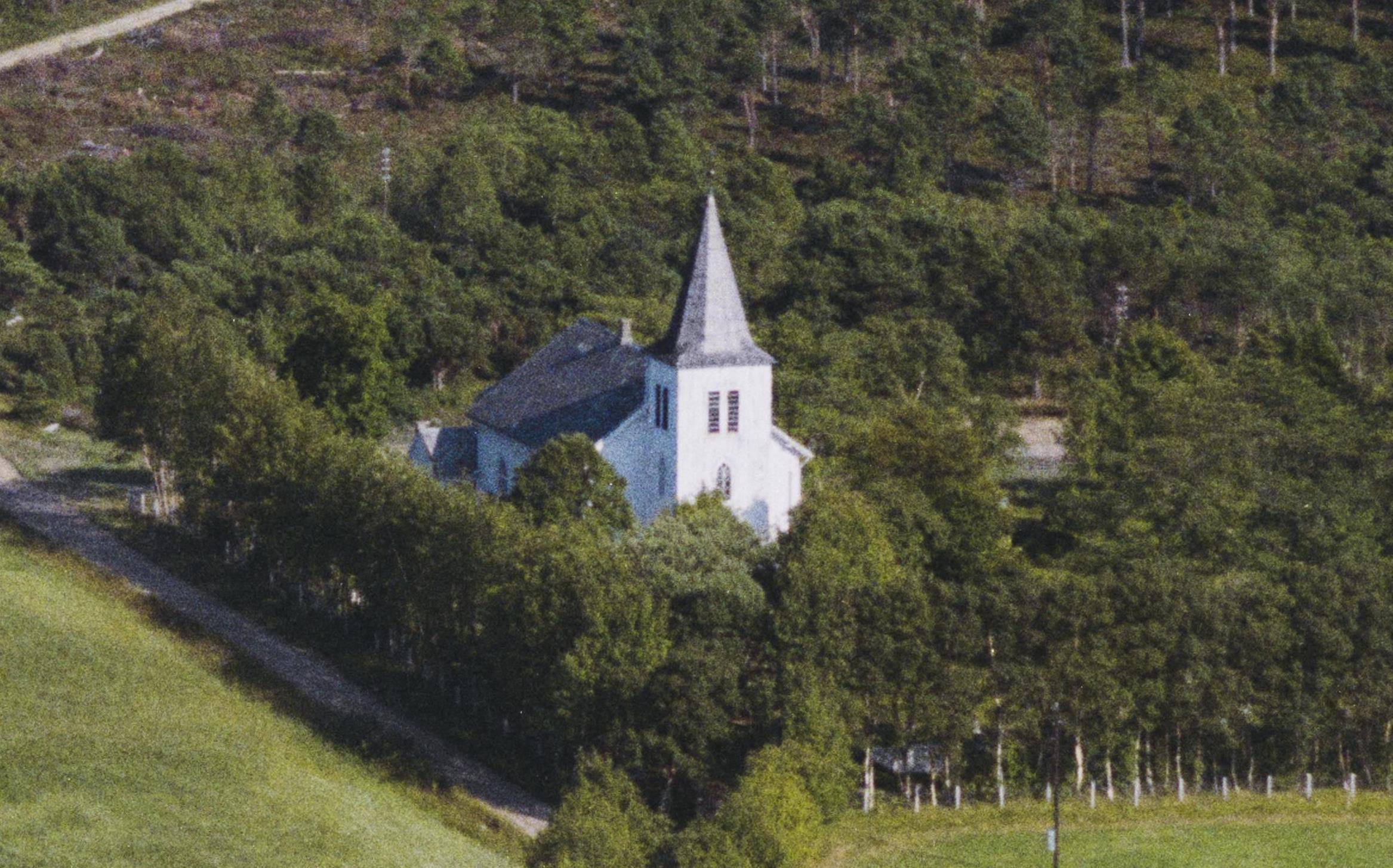
- View of the church
- Vik Church
- 64.45555193°N 10.76142919°E
- Location: Flatanger Municipality, Trøndelag
- Country: Norway
- Denomination: Church of Norway
- Churchmanship: Evangelical Lutheran

History
- Status: Parish church
- Founded: 14th century
- Consecrated: 25 November 1873

Architecture
- Functional status: Active
- Architect: Jacob Wilhelm Nordan
- Architectural type: Long church
- Completed: 1873 (153 years ago)

Specifications
- Capacity: 300
- Materials: Wood

Administration
- Diocese: Nidaros bispedømme
- Deanery: Namdal prosti
- Parish: Flatanger
- Norwegian Cultural Heritage Site
- Type: Church
- Status: Not protected
- ID: 85051

Vik Church (Norwegian: Vik kirke) or Flatanger Church (Norwegian: Flatanger kirke) is a parish church of the Church of Norway in Flatanger Municipality in Trøndelag county, Norway. It is located in the village of Vik. It is the main church for the Flatanger parish which is part of the Namdal prosti (deanery) in the Diocese of Nidaros. The white, wooden church was built in a long church style in 1873 using plans drawn up by the architect Jacob Wilhelm Nordan. The church seats about 300 people.

== History ==
The earliest existing historical records of the church date back to the year 1468, but it was not new that year. The old church was likely a stave church that was built in the 14th century. The church was located on the island of Halmøya, about 7 kilometres (4.3 mi) north of the present church site. The church stood on the southeast coast of the island, about 50 metres (160 ft) from the beach. The church underwent repairs in 1687, 1703, and 1724. In 1732, the church was considerably expanded in connection with some renovations and repairs after a fire caused by a lightning strike. In 1773, lightning struck the church again and it burned to the ground. A new church was built on the same site in 1779. This new church was likely about 18 by 9 metres (59 ft × 30 ft).

In 1814, this church served as an election church (Norwegian: valgkirke). Together with more than 300 other parish churches across Norway, it was a polling station for elections to the 1814 Norwegian Constituent Assembly which wrote the Constitution of Norway. This was Norway's first national elections. Each church parish was a constituency that elected people called "electors" who later met together in each county to elect the representatives for the assembly that was to meet at Eidsvoll Manor later that year.

In the mid-1800s, there was a heated debate in the parish about what to do with the church and its location. Some wanted it to be moved to the mainland and others wanted it to remain on the island of Halmøya. There was also debate over where on the mainland to build the church. Finally, it was decided to build 2 churches on the mainland. The whole Flatanger area became its own parish in 1870 (separating from the large Fosnes parish). A brand new church, Løvøy Church, would be built to serve the northern part of the municipality and the old church on the island would be torn down and rebuilt on the mainland as Vik Church which would serve the southern part of the municipality. Løvøy Church was completed in 1872. Work on Vik Church was begun in 1872, but most of the building was blown down in a large storm on 19 January 1873. Work continued on the church and it was finally completed in the fall of 1873. The new church was consecrated on 25 November 1873 by Pastor Brun, the Dean of Namdalen.

On 18 November 1913, lightning struck the church. The steeple was shattered and the ceiling and attic on the south by the foot of the tower was torn up with a gap of 8 to 9 feet (2.4 to 2.7 m) in each direction. The windows and doors were blown out from the pressure, but the church did not burn. A strong rain followed by thunderstorms was probably what saved it. In 1913–1914, the church was rebuilt and painted.

== See also ==
- List of churches in Nidaros
