= Tora Dahle Aagård =

Norwegian musician

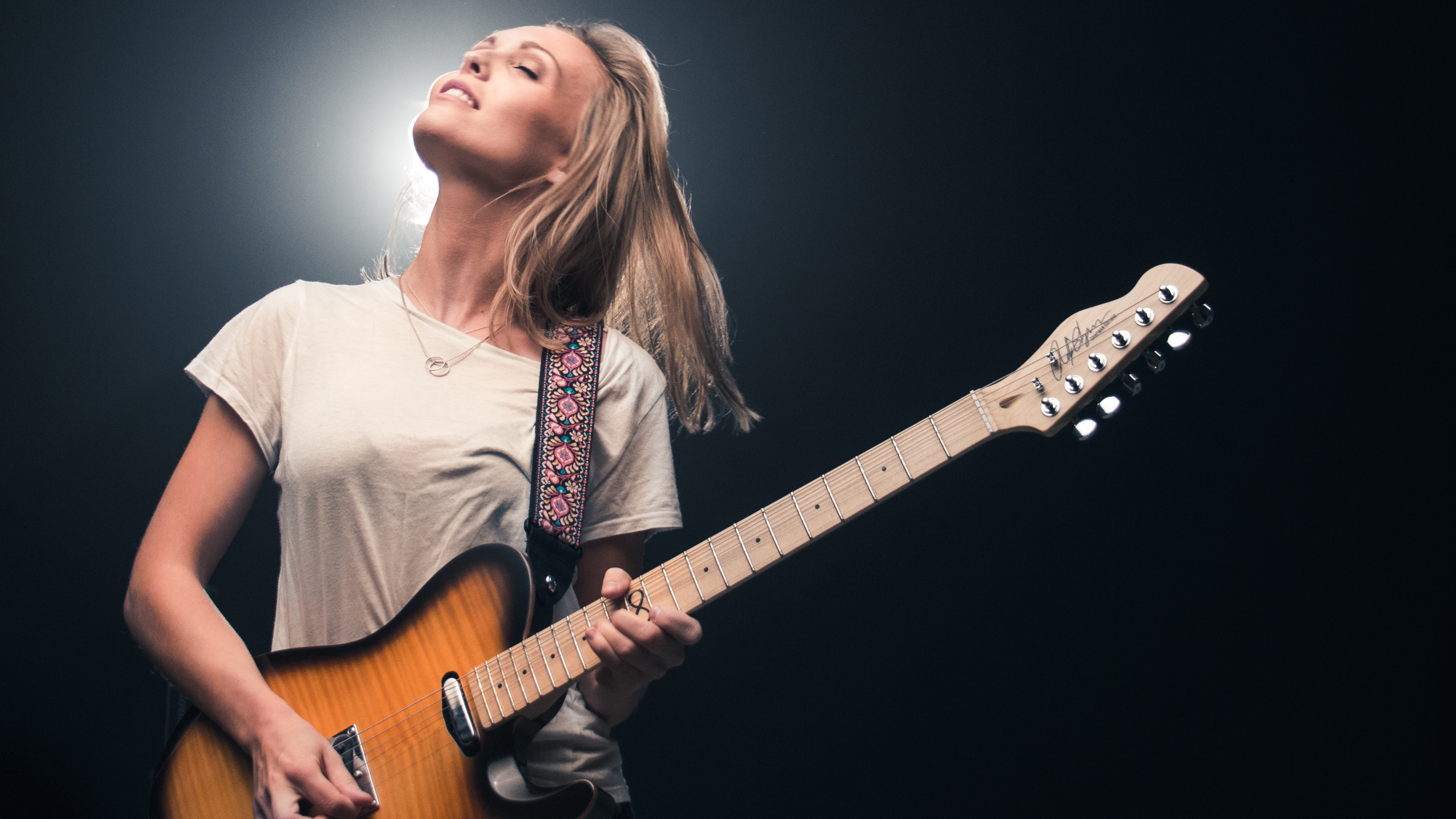
- Tora Dahle Aagård performing in 2018

Background information
- Born: 3 January 1994 (age 32); Flatanger Municipality, Norway
- Occupations: Musician; Songwriter
- Years active: 2008–present
- Musical career
- Genres: blues rock; pop rock
- Instruments: Guitar; vocals
- Label: Touchdown Music
- Website: toradaa.com

YouTube information
- Channel: TORA DAA
- Years active: 2016–present
- Genres: Music; vlogs
- Subscribers: 10.4 thousand
- Views: 972 thousand
- Last updated: 23 September 2025

Tora Dahle Aagård (born 3 January 1994) is a Norwegian guitarist, singer, songwriter and frontwoman of her own blues-inspired pop rock band, TORA DAA.

== Early life ==
Tora Dahle Aagård is the sister of Julie Dahle Aagård. Tora started playing guitar at the age of 14, after watching the 2003 film School of Rock. She studied music, dance and drama at Olav Duun Upper Secondary School in Namsos Municipality, Trøndelag, from 2011 to 2013. In 2012, she got the lead role in a musical called Kongen av luftslott [King of the Pipedream], with newly written music by Åge Aleksandersen. In 2014 and 2015, she played the sister of the lead character in the musical Vinsjan på kaia [Winch on the Quay] at Verdal Municipality, where the music consisted of songs by D.D.E.

== Career ==
Tora Dahle Aagård began her YouTube channel in 2016. She performed at the Royal Albert Hall in London during The Norwegian Blues Adventure in November 2019 together with Knut Reiersrud, Vidar Busk and Amund Maarud, among others.

=== TORA DAA ===
She is a guitarist, vocalist and songwriter in the band TORA DAA, which plays blues-inspired pop rock. In 2019, the band released their self-titled debut album. The band's second album, Girls, was released in September 2020. The second album was nominated for the 2020 Spellemannprisen in the Blues category.

== Equipment ==
Tora Dahle Aagård uses a Vintage S-type, a Yamaha Revstar, a customised Fender Stratocaster, and an Epiphone guitar. She uses acoustic guitars manufactured by Alvarez and Tanglewood. Tora Dahle Aagård is the first female guitarist to be endorsed by Chapman Guitars. She has two signature instruments built by Marceau Guitars. For amplification, she has used a Fender Hotrod and a Boss Nextone.

== Discography ==
Albums:

- Tora (2019)
- Girls (2020)
- Seventeen (2022)
- Prayer and Pleasure (2025)

EP:

- "Change of Scenery" (2016)

Single:

- "Sugar" (2024)
