= Vik, Trøndelag =

Village in Flatanger Municipality, Norway

Vik
- Village
- Interactive map of Vik
- Location within Trøndelag Location within Norway
- Coordinates: 64.4560°N 10.7592°E
- Country: Norway
- Region: Central Norway
- County: Trøndelag
- District: Namdalen
- Municipality: Flatanger Municipality
- Elevation: 16 m (52 ft)
- Time zone: UTC+01:00 (CET)
  - Summer (DST): UTC+02:00 (CEST)
- Post Code: 7770 Flatanger

Vik is a village in Flatanger Municipality in Trøndelag county, Norway. The village is located about 14 kilometres (8.7 mi) west of the municipal center of Lauvsnes. The village has a school, a shop, and Vik Church.
