= Ellingråsa Lighthouse =

Ellingråsa Lighthouse Ellingråsa fyrstasjon
- Location: Trøndelag, Norway
- Coordinates: 64°34′28.2″N 10°48′02.8″E

Tower
- Constructed: 1888 (first)
- Automated: 1959
- Height: 5.7 metres (19 ft)
- Shape: Cylindrical tower
- Markings: White with red top
- Operator: Ellingråsa Lighthouse Lodge

Light
- First lit: 2001 (current)
- Deactivated: 2001 (first)
- Focal height: 20.5 metres (67 ft)
- Range: Red: 5.5 nmi (10.2 km; 6.3 mi) Green: 5.1 nmi (9.4 km; 5.9 mi) White: 7.5 nmi (13.9 km; 8.6 mi)
- Characteristic: Fl (2) WRG 5s
- Norway no.: 509100

Ellingråsa Lighthouse (Norwegian: Ellingråsa fyrstasjon) is a lighthouse that is located on the island of Bjørøya in the Folda sea in Flatanger Municipality in Trøndelag county, Norway. The lighthouse was completed in 1888 to replace the old Villa Lighthouse which closed in 1890. Ellingråsa Lighthouse was automated in 1959.

The 5.7-metre (19 ft) tall tower emits a white, red or green light (depending on direction), flashing twice every five seconds. The light can be seen for up to 7.5 nmi (13.9 km; 8.6 mi) away. The tower sits right next to the old Ellingråsa Lighthouse building which was closed in 2001.

== See also ==
- Lighthouses in Norway
- List of lighthouses in Norway
