= Lauvøya, Flatanger =

Island in Trøndelag, Norway

Lauvøya Løvøya (historic)
- Interactive map of Lauvøya; Løvøya (historic)

Geography
- Location: Trøndelag, Norway
- Coordinates: 64.5161°N 10.8693°E
- Area: 2.6 km^{2} (1.0 sq mi)
- Length: 2.6 km (1.62 mi)
- Width: 2 km (1.2 mi)
- Highest elevation: 94 m (308 ft)
- Highest point: Lauvøyfjellet

Administration
- Norway
- County: Trøndelag
- Municipality: Flatanger Municipality

Lauvøya is an island in Flatanger Municipality in Trøndelag county, Norway. The island sits just off the mainland coast, across from the village of Lauvsnes. The main church for northern Flatanger, Løvøy Church, is located on the island. The 2.6-square-kilometre (640-acre) island has been connected to the mainland by a bridge since 1990. The island has several homes on it and has become an important recreational area for the municipality.

== See also ==
- List of islands of Norway
