= Lauvsnes =

Village in Flatanger Municipality, Norway

- Village
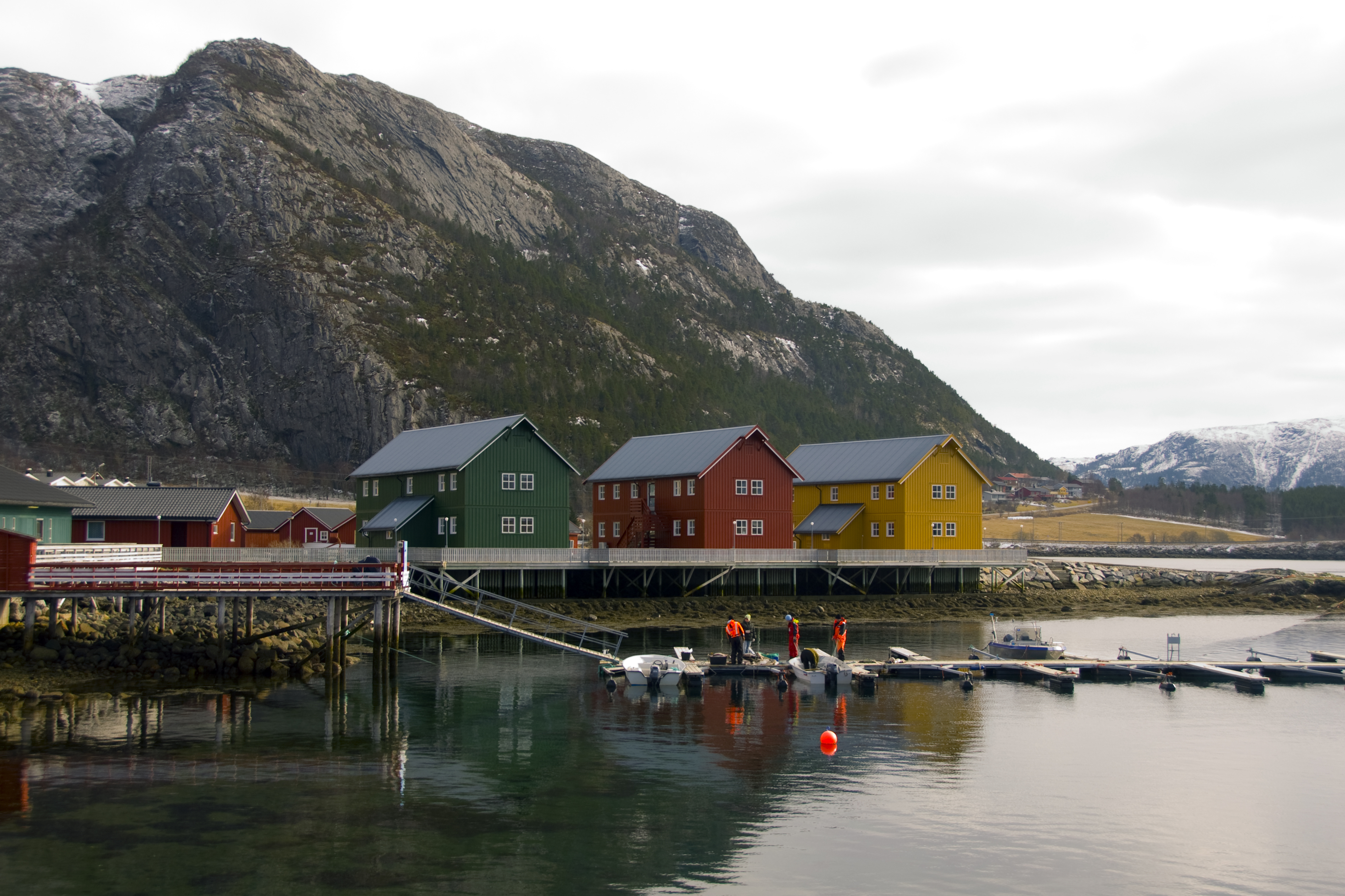
- View of the harbor area of Lauvsnes
- Interactive map of Lauvsnes
- Location within Trøndelag Location within Norway
- Coordinates: 64.5006°N 10.8940°E
- Country: Norway
- Region: Central Norway
- County: Trøndelag
- District: Namdalen
- Municipality: Flatanger Municipality

Area
  - Total: 0.6 km^{2} (0.23 sq mi)
- Elevation: 12 m (39 ft)

Population (2024)
  - Total: 530
  - Density: 883/km^{2} (2,290/sq mi)
- Time zone: UTC+01:00 (CET)
  - Summer (DST): UTC+02:00 (CEST)
- Post Code: 7770 Flatanger

Lauvsnes is the administrative centre of Flatanger Municipality in Trøndelag county, Norway. The village is located along the shore, about 15 kilometres (9.3 mi) northeast of the village of Vik. Lauvsnes has some small industry as well as fish farming. The island of Løvøya lies just north of the village.

The 0.6-square-kilometre (150-acre) village has a population (2024) of 530 and a population density of 883 inhabitants per square kilometre (2,290/sq mi).

== 2006 flood ==
In January 2006, parts of Lauvsnes were hit by a flood on the river Lauvsneselva, which passes through a dam on its way to the village. The water flowed over the dam from the Lauvsnes lake and rushed down river. A house was carried by the flood and swept into the sea. Two bridges in the village were destroyed. The water and sewer system was damaged, as was the community center. Some residents were evacuated from their homes.
